= Mérida (state) =

Mérida Estado Mérida (Spanish)
- State
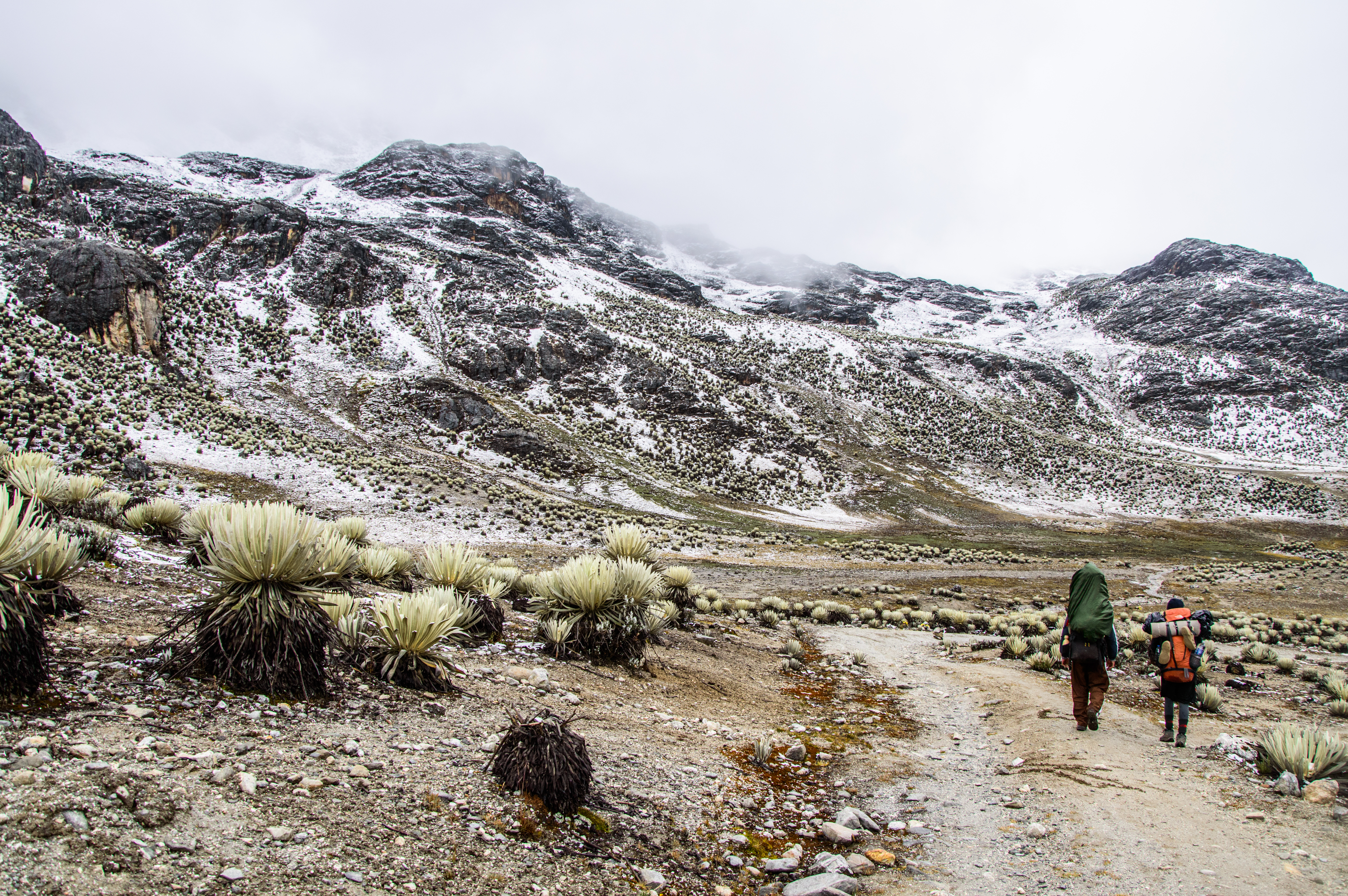
- The Sierra de la Culata

- Flag Coat of arms
- Anthem: Himno del Estado Mérida
- Location within Venezuela
- Coordinates: 8.48°N 71.19°W
- Country: Venezuela
- Established: 1864
- Capital: Mérida

Government
  - Body: Legislative Council
  - Governor: Arnaldo Sánchez (PSUV)

Area
  - Total: 11,300 km^{2} (4,400 sq mi)
  - Rank: 15th
- 1.23% of Venezuela

Population (2011 census)
  - Total: 828,592
  - Rank: 14th
  - Density: 73.3/km^{2} (190/sq mi)
- 3,1% of Venezuela
- Time zone: UTC−4 (VET)
- ISO 3166 code: VE-L
- Emblematic tree: Bucare ceibo (Erythrina poeppigiana)
- HDI (2019): 0.700 high · 12th of 24
- Website: www.merida.gob.ve

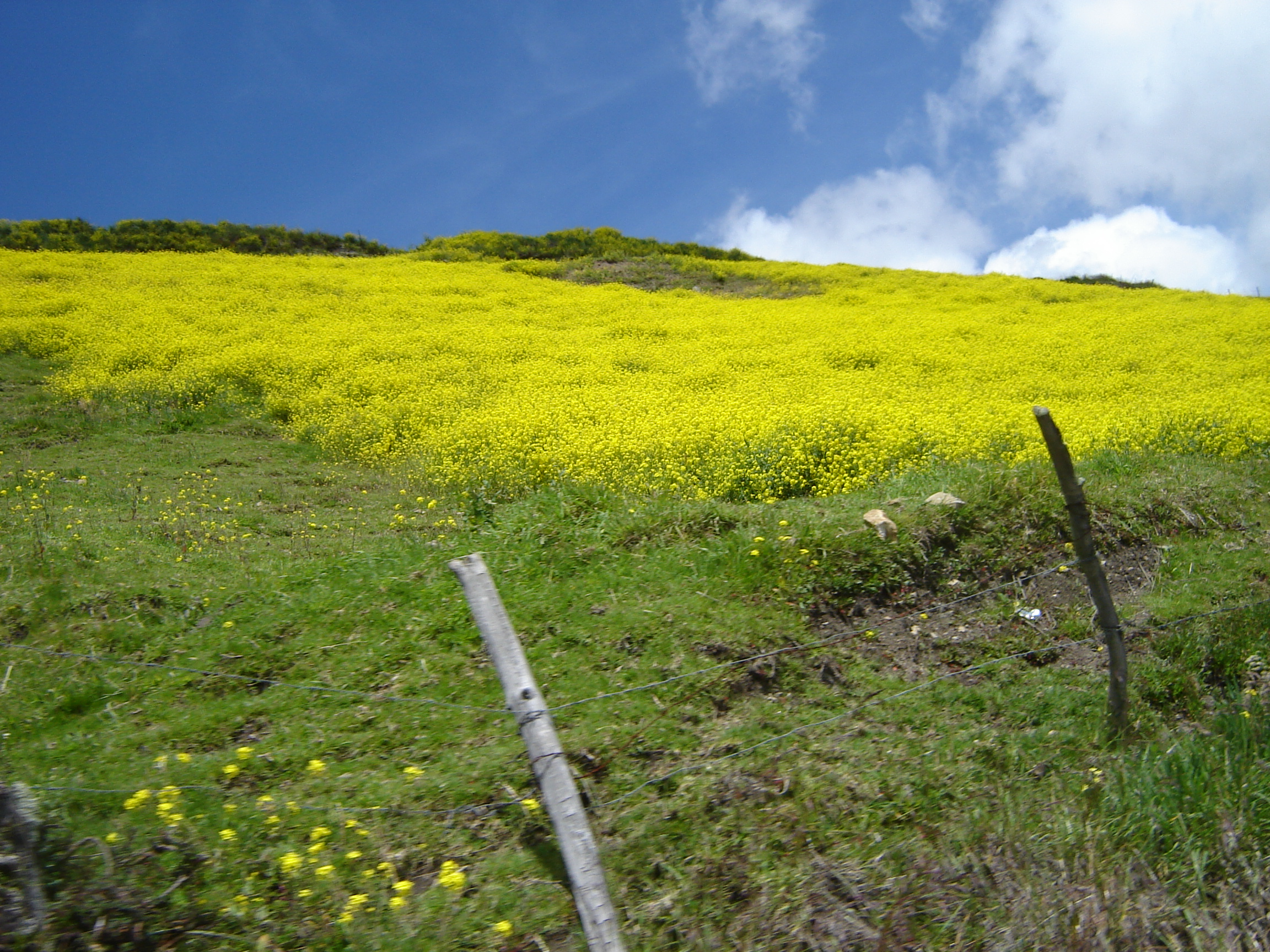
landscape in the state of Merida

The State of Mérida commonly known simply as Mérida (Spanish: Estado Bolivariano de Mérida, IPA: [esˈtaðo ðe ˈmeɾiða]) is one of the 23 states of Venezuela. The state capital is Mérida, in the Libertador Municipality.

Located in the Western Andean Region, Mérida State covers a total surface area of 11,300 square kilometres (4,363 sq mi), making it the fifteenth-largest in Venezuela. In 2011, had a census population of 828,592, the fourteenth most populous.

== History ==
=== Pre-Colonial ===
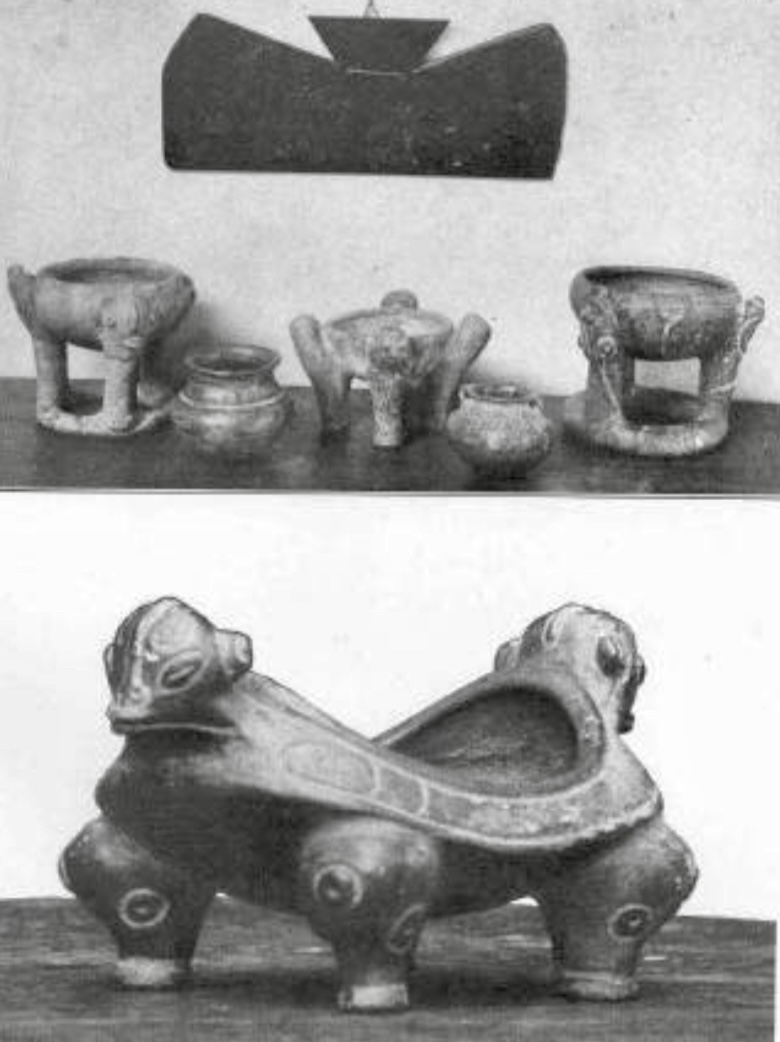
Plaque and ceramics of the Nikitao and Cuica tribes

According to recent studies in archaeology, history and anthropology, The Andean region seems to have been inhabited since very remote times (perhaps several thousand years) by unknown groups that have left very few traces.

Then, around our era, another ethnic group arrives in the region, perhaps of Chibcha origin, since they share with these their mythology, funeral and settlement patterns, housing construction, agricultural techniques, etc. When the Spanish arrive in the Andean Cordillera it will be with this second group you will come in contact with. It is assumed that the majority of today's farmers are descendants of this Chibcha trunk group.

Another later and significant influence for the Andean pre-Hispanic culture are the Arawak groups, belonging to the most important ethnic groups of South America and the Caribbean, which migrated to the Venezuelan Andes during the 9th century AD. Finally, shortly before the arrival of the Spanish, we have a late penetration of Caribbean groups into the Andean region.

From the data of the chroniclers and the archaeological testimonies, today we know that the indigenous agricultural techniques like the irrigation systems (called acequias by the Spaniards) and the cultivation in terraces or andenes (used in all the South American Andes to take advantage of the slopes of the mountains) show for the time of the contact the existence of an economic infrastructure that supposes the presence of a numerous native population in the Andean Mountain range, as well as the existence of a hierarchical political organization and a network of communications in all the zone.

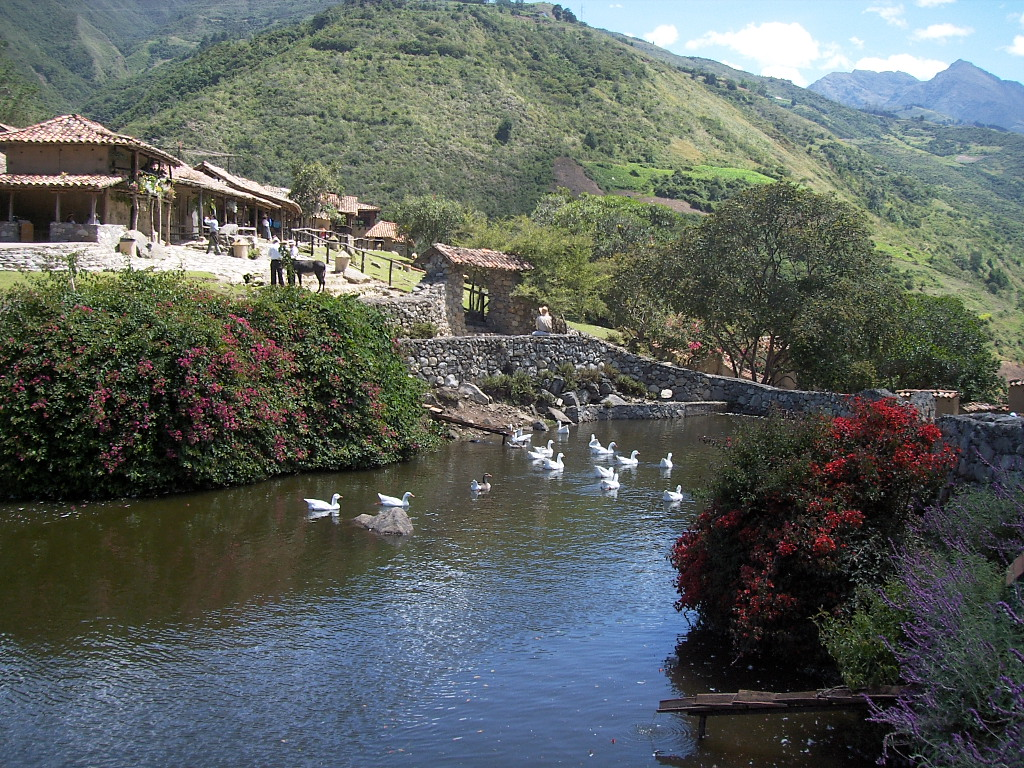
Los Aleros, Mérida

The Spaniards will use this indigenous population base for the development of the society they intended to establish in America. An important area of encomiendas and doctrinal towns. Thanks to this, the current toponymy of the Venezuelan Andes has preserved the names of the many indigenous groups that inhabited this region: Timoto-Cuica, Chama, Mocotíes, Mucuchíes, Tabayes, Mucutuy, Aricagua, etc.

=== Spanish colonization ===
In 1558 Juan Rodríguez Suárez founded the city of Mérida, in the name of the Corregimiento de Tunja, in honor of his native city of Mérida in Spain. In December 1607 Merida was separated from the Corregimiento de Tunja and united with the government of La Grita forming the corregimiento de Merida y La Grita. On November 3, 1622 it became the governorship of Merida with Juan Pacheco Maldonado as governor.

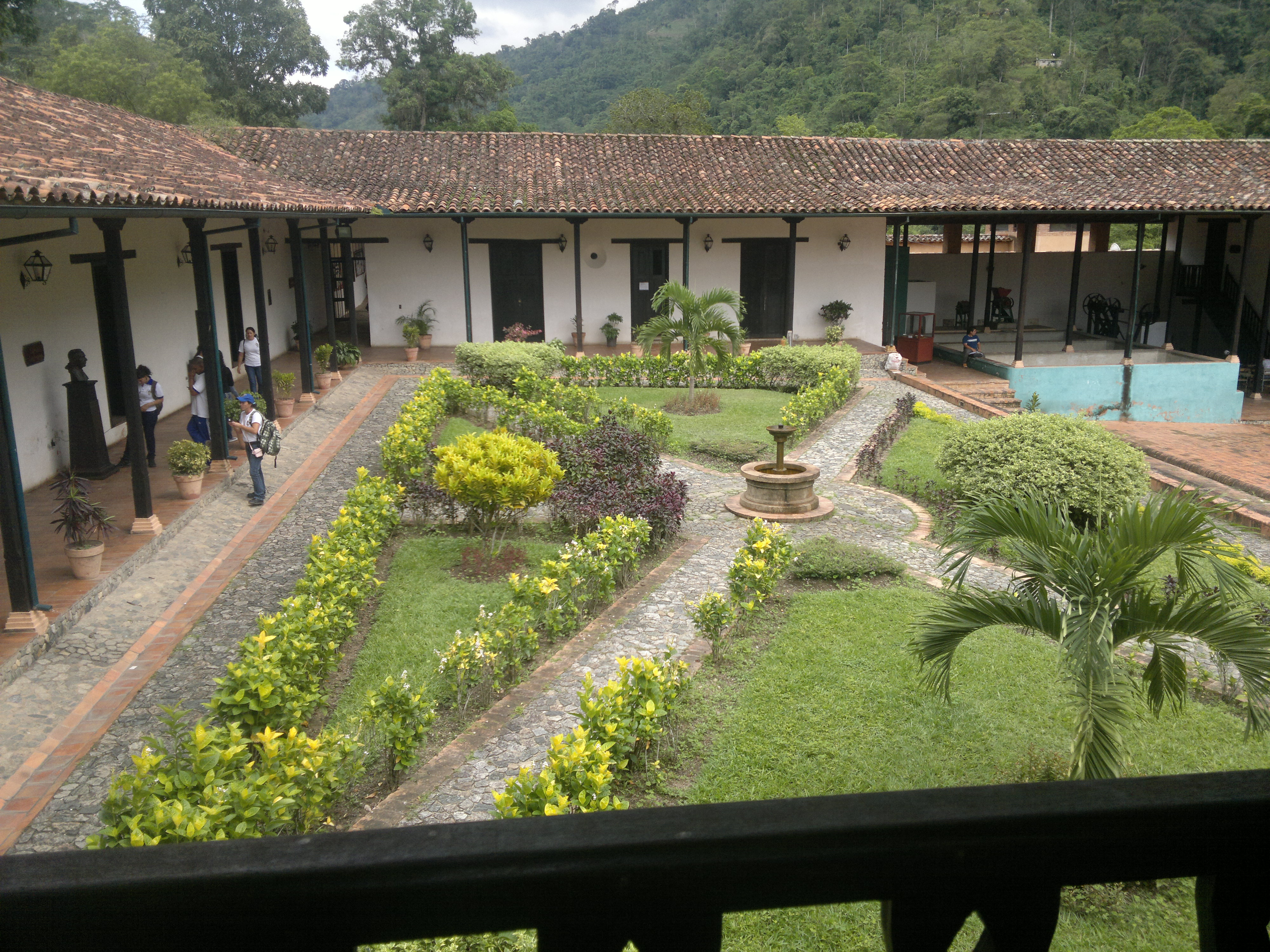
Colonial Hacienda of La Victoria

In 1676 Maracaibo (separated from the province of Venezuela) and Mérida-La Grita are united in a governorship called Province of Mérida del Espíritu Santo de Maracaibo (capital in Mérida) under the Audiencia of Bogota and then known as "province of Maracaibo" since 1678 that city becomes the capital of the governorship.

By 1677 the Pirate Michel de Grandmont sacked Trujillo, this attack led Governor Jorge de Madureira to change the capital of the province to the city of Maracaibo in 1678, to organize a more effective defense of the territory.

The territory of the province of Merida depended on the Viceroyalty of New Granada until 1777, when the Captaincy General of Venezuela was created.

=== 18th century ===
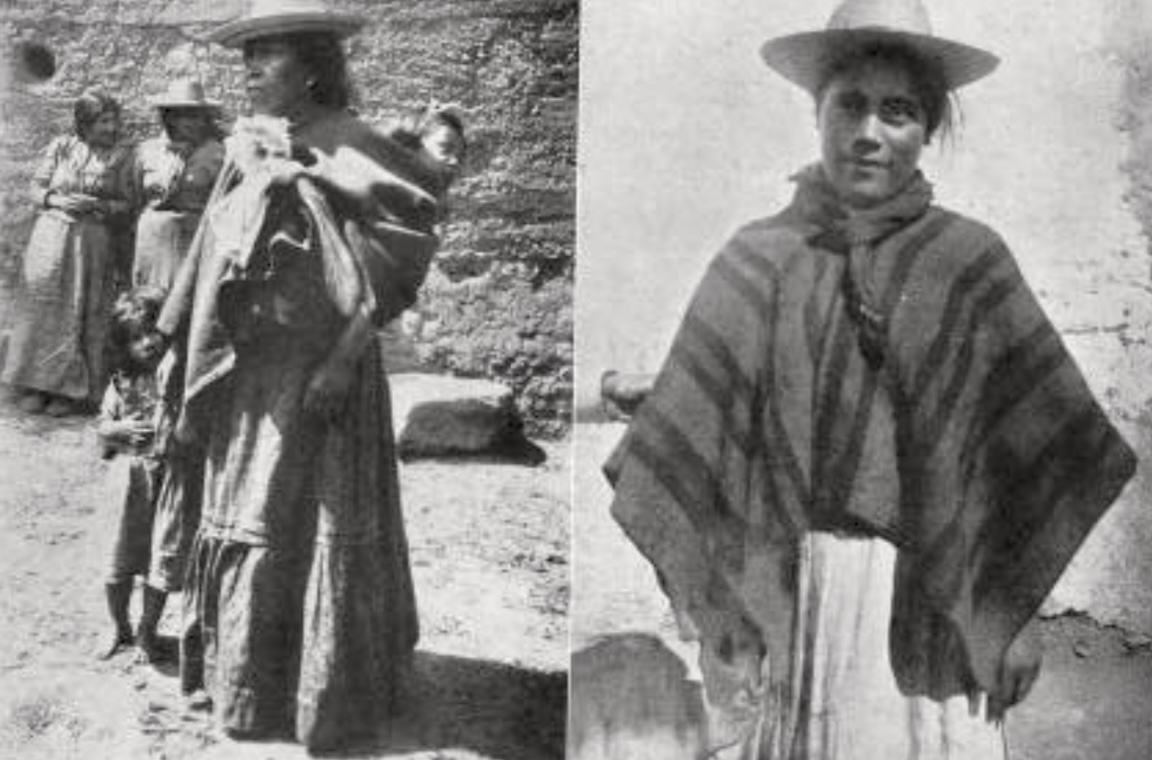
Native women from Mucuchíes, Venezuela

In 1811 the province of Merida decided to rebel against Spain and join the process of Venezuelan Independence, along with seven other provinces to form the First Republic of Venezuela. The region would be represented by a star on the Venezuelan flag ever since.

In 1812 an earthquake devastates the city of Merida, and soon after the province is reconquered by the royalists.

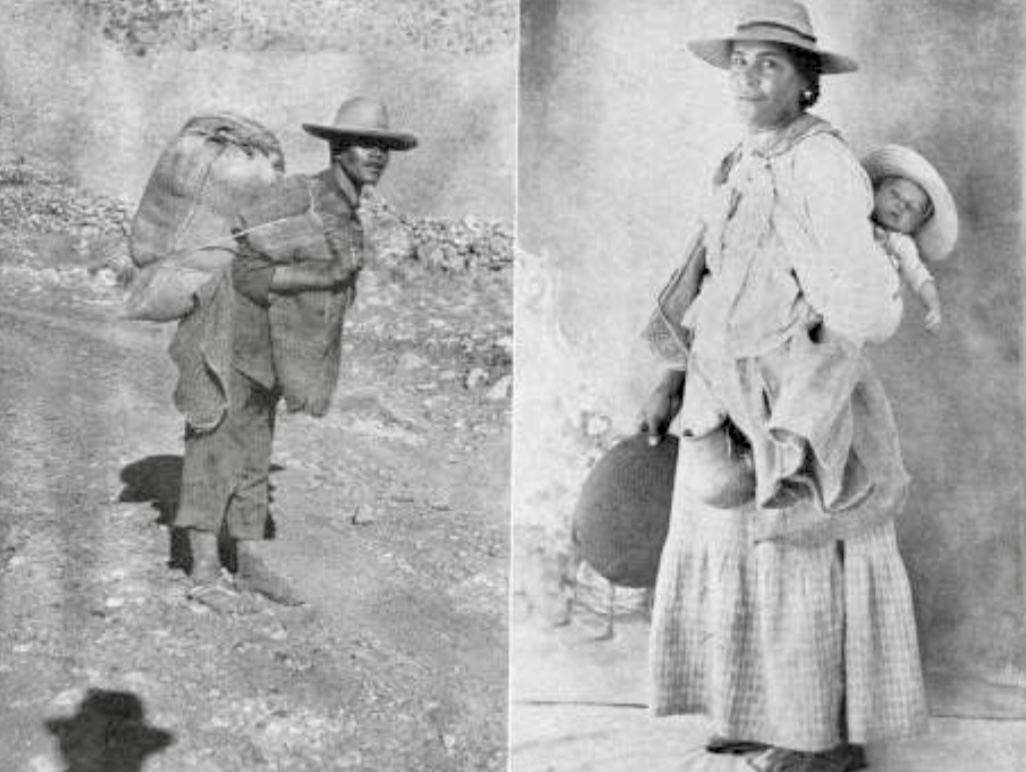
Native people from Mucuchíes, Venezuela

The following year during the Admirable Campaign, Simón Bolívar liberates Mérida from the Realists, entering through La Grita (then the province of Mérida) in May 1813. On his journey he passes through Bailadores, Merida and Timotes liberating the province of Merida. With the victory of the Admirable Campaign, Merida is incorporated to the Second Republic of Venezuela.

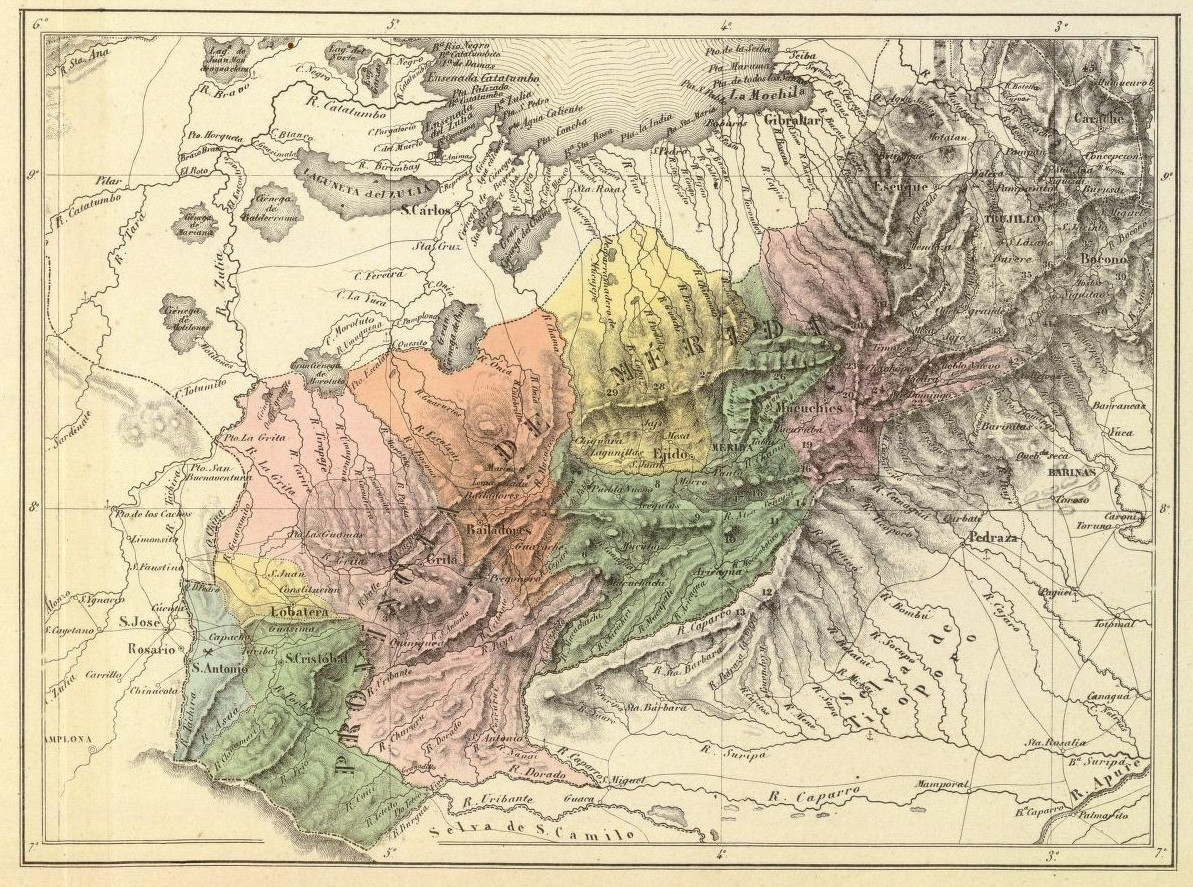
Mérida Province in 1840

In 1814 With the loss of the Second Republic, Merida is again temporarily incorporated into the Captaincy General of Venezuela. Three years later, the popular independence movement known as La Patriecita, will be suffocated by the Spanish royalists in 1818.

By 1820 the crossing of the Andes by Bolivar's army, frees Merida again. With the victory of Boyacá on August 7, only the provinces of Maracaibo and Coro remained realistic and Merida was incorporated into the Third Republic of Venezuela.

In 1821 Merida was incorporated into Gran Colombia as part of the Department of Zulia, but in 1830 when Venezuela separated from Gran Colombia, the Department of Zulia was renamed the Province of Maracaibo. The provinces of Merida and Coro were immediately separated, leaving the province composed only of the sections Zulia and Trujillo.

In 1835 the division of the province was established in: Canton Mérida, Canton Mucuchíes, Canton Ejido, Canton Bailadores, Canton La Grita, Canton San Cristóbal and Canton San Antonio del Táchira and in 1842 the governor of the province Gabriel Picón inaugurates the first monument to Bolívar in the world known as La Columna in Milla Park.

Around 1856 the cantons of La Grita, San Crsitóbal and San Antonio del Táchira separate to form the Province of Táchira.

On November 23, 1863, the State of Merida was created with the territory of Merida, Ejido, Bailadores, Mucuchies and Timotes. In 1868 it was incorporated to the State of Zulia, together with Táchira, but it was separated in 1869.

In 1874 it was renamed Guzmán State. In 1881, it became part of the Great State of the Andes together with Táchira and Trujillo. This state was dissolved in 1899 and was limited to the territory it had as an independent state.

=== 20th century ===
Since 1909 it has been a state of Merida. At the beginning of the century in 1912, after the closure of the Universidad Central de Venezuela by the government of Juan Vicente Gómez, the city of Mérida was left as the only one in the country with access to higher education, a situation that would last until 1922 when the UCV was reopened.

== Geography ==
The state of Merida is located in the west of Venezuela, in the so-called Andean region, forming part of the Andes mountain range of the South American continent; of the three states (Merida, Tachira and Trujillo) that are located in this region. The territory of the state is located in the highest part of Venezuela, therefore, makes Merida the highest state of Venezuela, with altitudes above 4,000 m.a.s.l., reaching its highest point in Pico Bolivar at about 4,970 m.a.s.l.

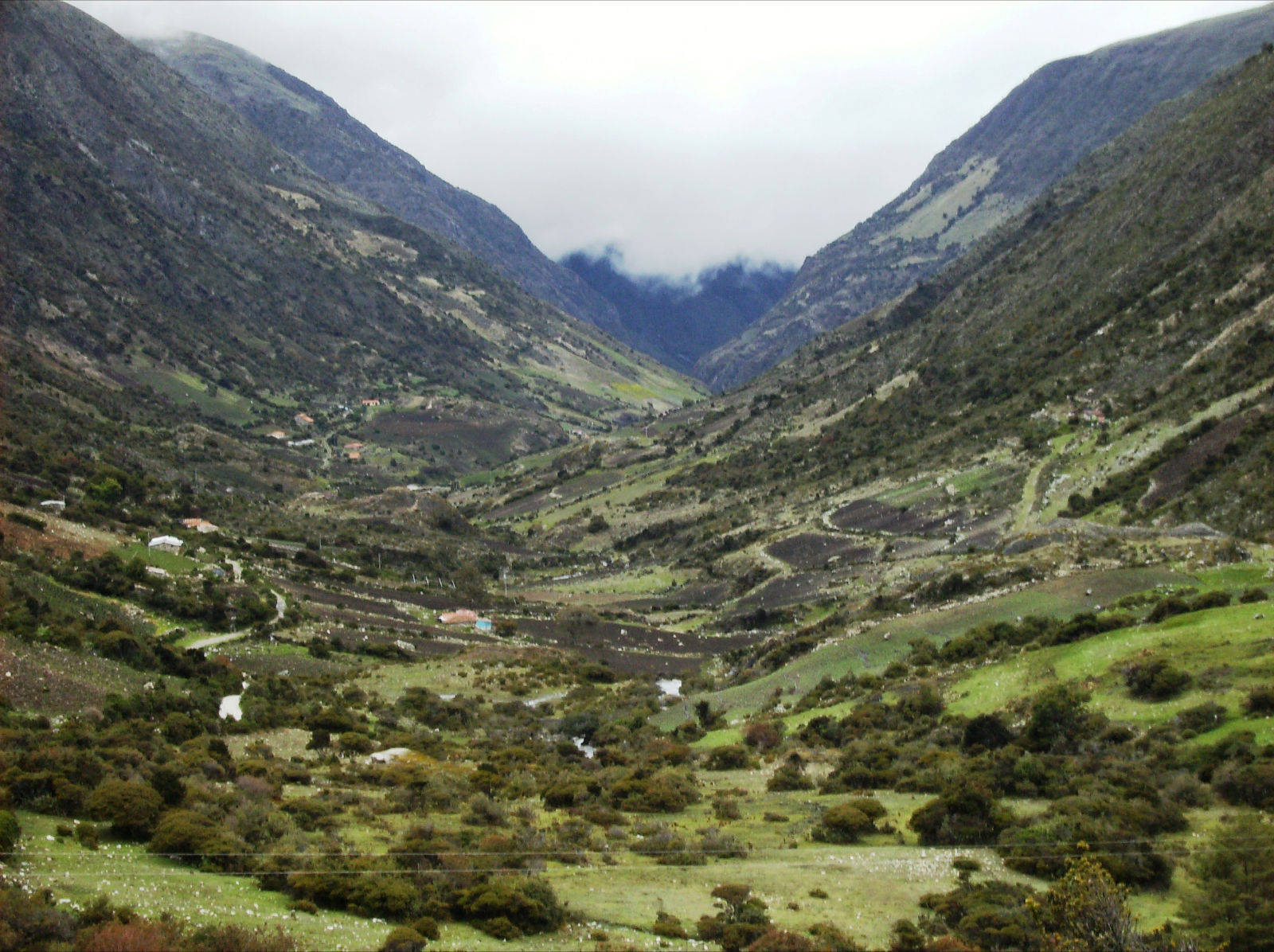
Gavidia Valley

Mérida is one of the states with the greatest geographical diversity, presenting different landscapes throughout its territory, with high areas above 4,000 m.a.s.l., medium areas with elevations around 900 and 1,600 m.a.s.l. and areas closer to sea level such as the so-called Southern Zone of the Lake below 200 m.a.s.l.

=== Climate ===
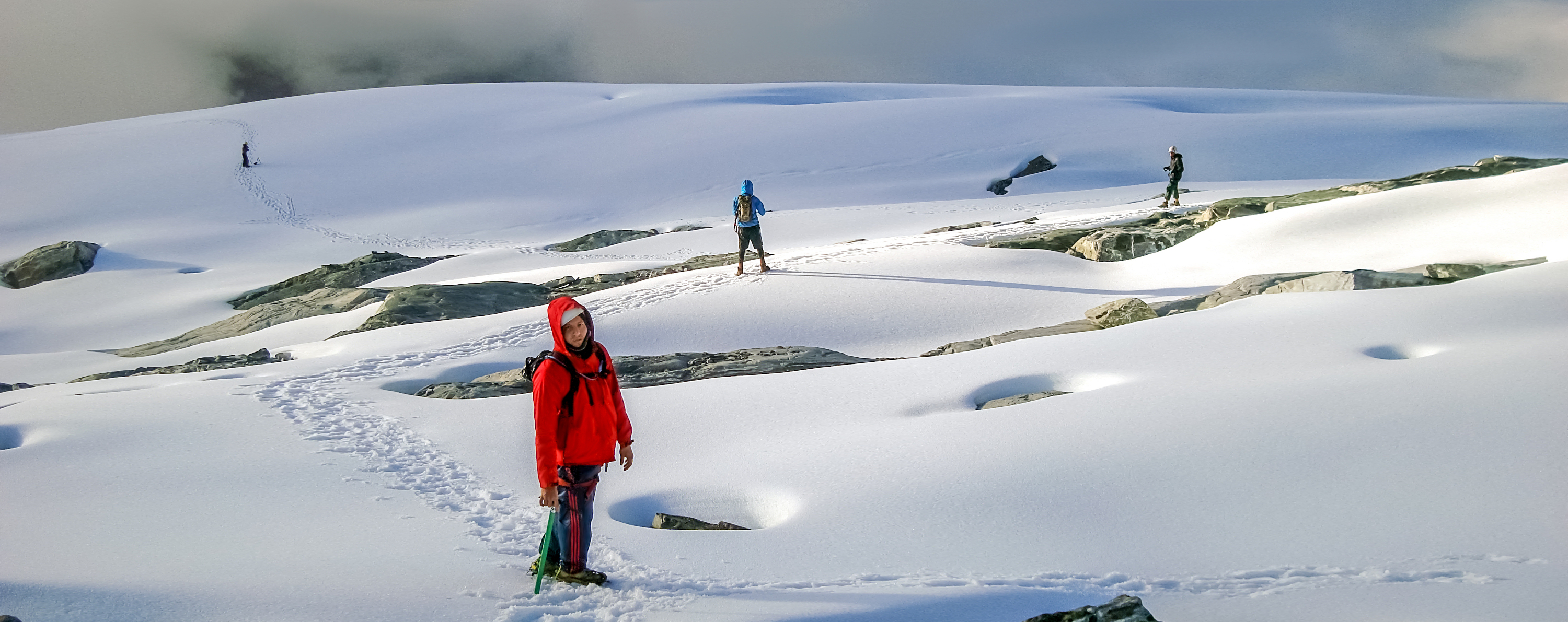
Snow in the Pico Humboldt.

The climate is temperate but in the relatively small area of Mérida state, there are usually several dramatic climatic changes that occur daily. The climate in Mérida city has an average high temperatures between 24 °C and 25 °C, and low temperatures between 14 °C and 16 °C. At higher peaks on the Sierra Nevada de Mérida, temperatures tend to be under 0 °C. El Vigía sees temperatures around 28 °C. It rains almost every late afternoon in January–February. These are the coldest months. In August and September it often rains at night.

Mérida has temperatures characteristic of each subregion, which can reach 32 °C in the Southern Zone of the Lake, less warm temperatures in the metropolitan area with values around 25 °C, warmer values between 17° and 22° towards the areas of the Mocotí Valley and the Northern Townships, and temperatures below 12 °C in the Southern Townships and the Paramo Townships, even reaching values below 0 °C in the latter.

=== Vegetation ===
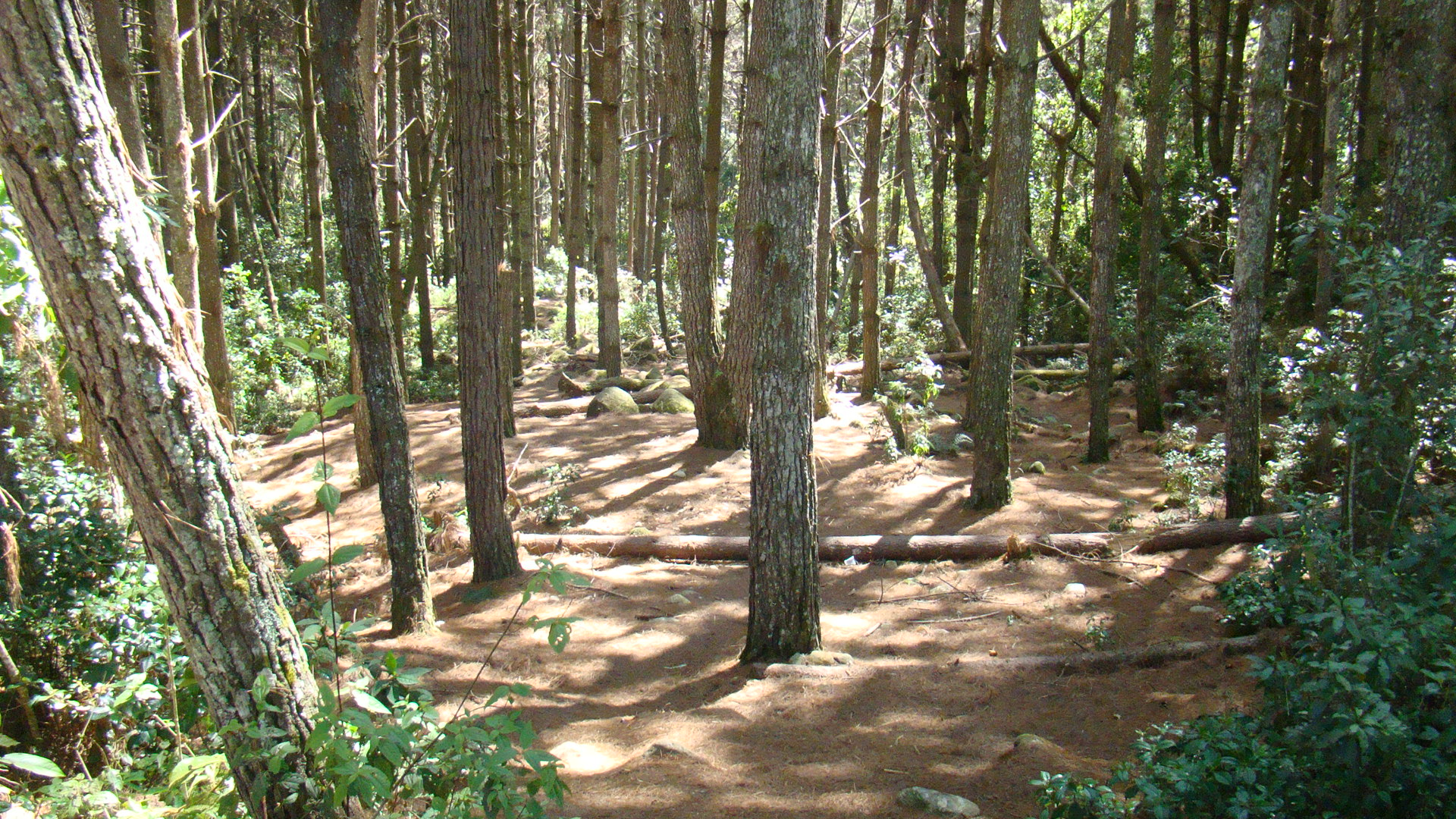
Forest in Mérida.

The vegetation is exuberant and there are many lakes and rivers, a great number of which are well stocked with trout, one of the delicacies of Mérida. The most important river in the state is the "Chama" because a large part of the water resources of Venezuela originates in the Mérida mountains. The state tree is the "Bucare" and the state flower is the "Frailejón", The "Coloradito" contains the tree that is found at the highest altitude in the world. In this mountains habitat the "Oso Frontino" bear and the Condor flies through the skies of the páramos and in the lagoons there are many trout.

=== Hydrography ===
The hydrography of the State of Merida is very varied, because throughout its geography we can find rivers, streams, creeks, natural lakes and glaciers, Merida even has jurisdiction over a small portion of Lake Maracaibo, where we located the beaches Palmarito in the municipality of Tulio Febres Cordero in the south of the lake.

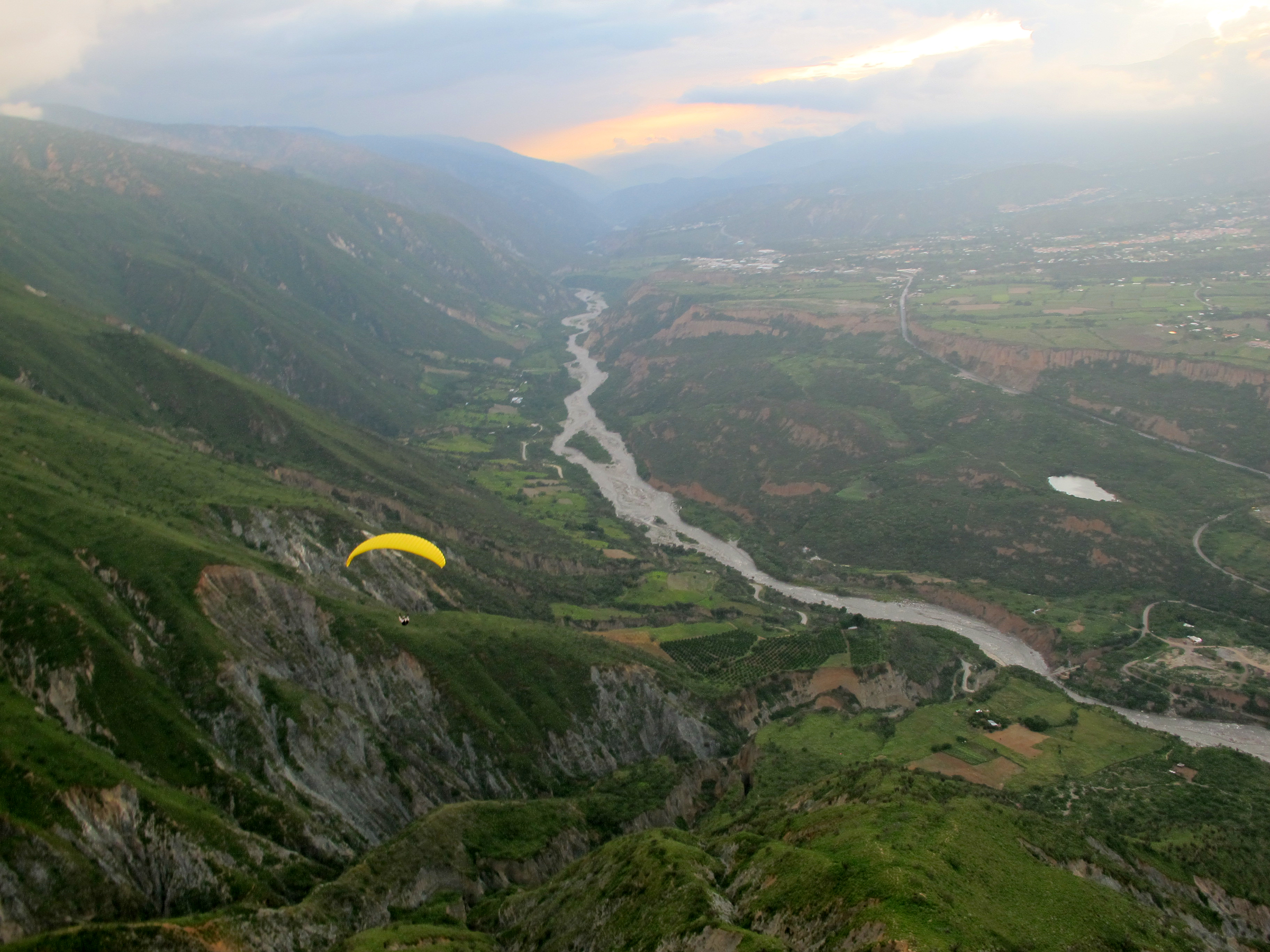
Chama River

==== Main rivers ====
The rivers of the State of Merida are mountain rivers, with abundant flow and steep slopes and form a few deep valleys, longitudinally embedded in the relief. They are located between the Andean alignments of the Sierra de Merida. The main ones are the Motatán in its upper basin and the Chama with its tributaries the Mocotíes and the Mucujún, which belong to the Maracaibo Lake basin, while the Santo Domingo, Caparo and Mucuchachí belong to the Orinoco basin through the Apure River.

==== Main lagoons ====
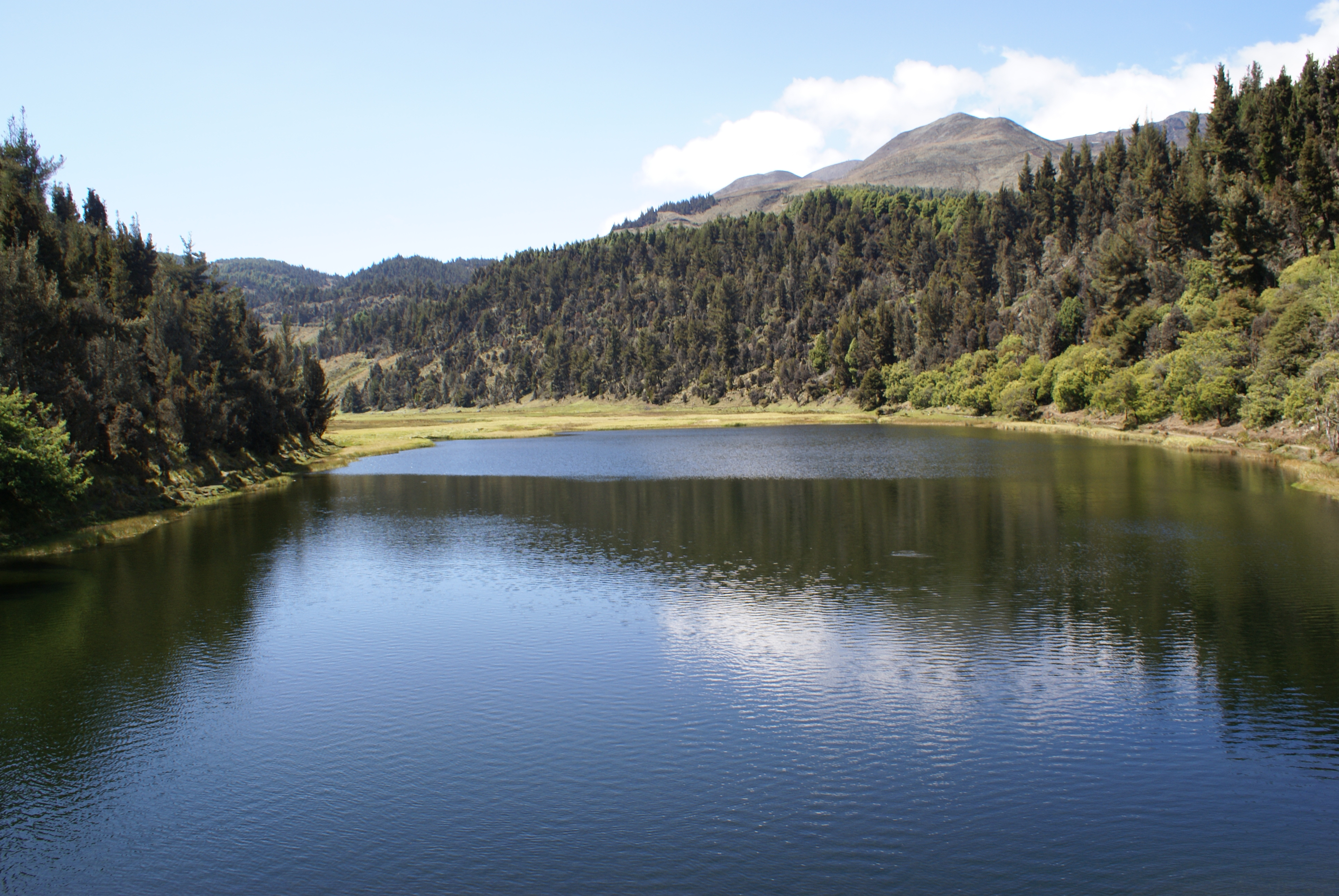
Victoria Lagoon, Mérida

- La Rosa Lagoon
- Lágrima de la India Lagoon
- Los Anteojos Lagoon
- Mucubají Lagoon
- Black Lagoon (Laguna Negra)
- Pico del Toro Lagoon
- Green Lagoon (Laguna Verde)
- El Suero Lagoon
- Urao Lagoon
- Del Humo Lagoon
- El Bizcocho Lagoon
- La Cura Lagoon
- La Barrosa or del Medio Lagoon
- Mina e'hierro lagoons
- Los Chorros Lagoon
- La Carbonera Lagoon
- La Escopeta Lagoon
- Brava Lagoon
- Los Lirios Lagoon
- White Lagoon (Laguna Blanca)
- Santo Cristo Lagoon

La Coromoto Lagoon

== Politics and government ==
The State is autonomous and equal in political terms to the rest of the Federation. It organizes its administration and public powers through the Constitution of the State of Merida, sanctioned by the Legislative Council on November 7, 1995 and promulgated by the State Governor on November 16 of the same year.

Like the other 23 federal entities of Venezuela, the State maintains its own police force, which is supported and complemented by the National Police and the Venezuelan National Guard.

=== Executive power ===
It is composed of the Governor of the State of Merida and a group of State Secretaries of his confidence who are freely appointed and removed officials and assist him in the management of the state government. The Governor is elected by the people through direct and secret vote for a period of four years and with the possibility of re-election for other periods, being in charge of the state administration.

Until 1989 the governors were appointed directly from the National Executive, it is only since then that they are directly elected in open elections.

The current governor is Ramón Guevara of the Acción Democrática party elected in the 2017 Regional Elections of Venezuela with 50.82% of the votes.

=== Legislative power ===
The state legislature is the responsibility of the Legislative Council of the State of Merida, a unicameral parliament, elected by the people through direct and secret vote every four years, and may be re-elected for two consecutive periods, under a system of proportional representation of the population of the state and its municipalities. The state has 9 deputies, of which 3 belong to the opposition and 6 to the ruling party.

The legislative council approves the use of state funds, can create new municipalities and has a range of functions relating to regional government.

== Administrative divisions ==
The capital of the state of Merida is the city of Merida and is divided into 23 municipalities and 86 parishes, which are strategically organized into 4 geopolitical zones:

- Metropolitan area
- Mocotíes Valley area
- South Zone of the Lake (Zona Sur del Lago)
- Northern villages (Pueblos del Norte)

=== Municipalities and municipal seats ===
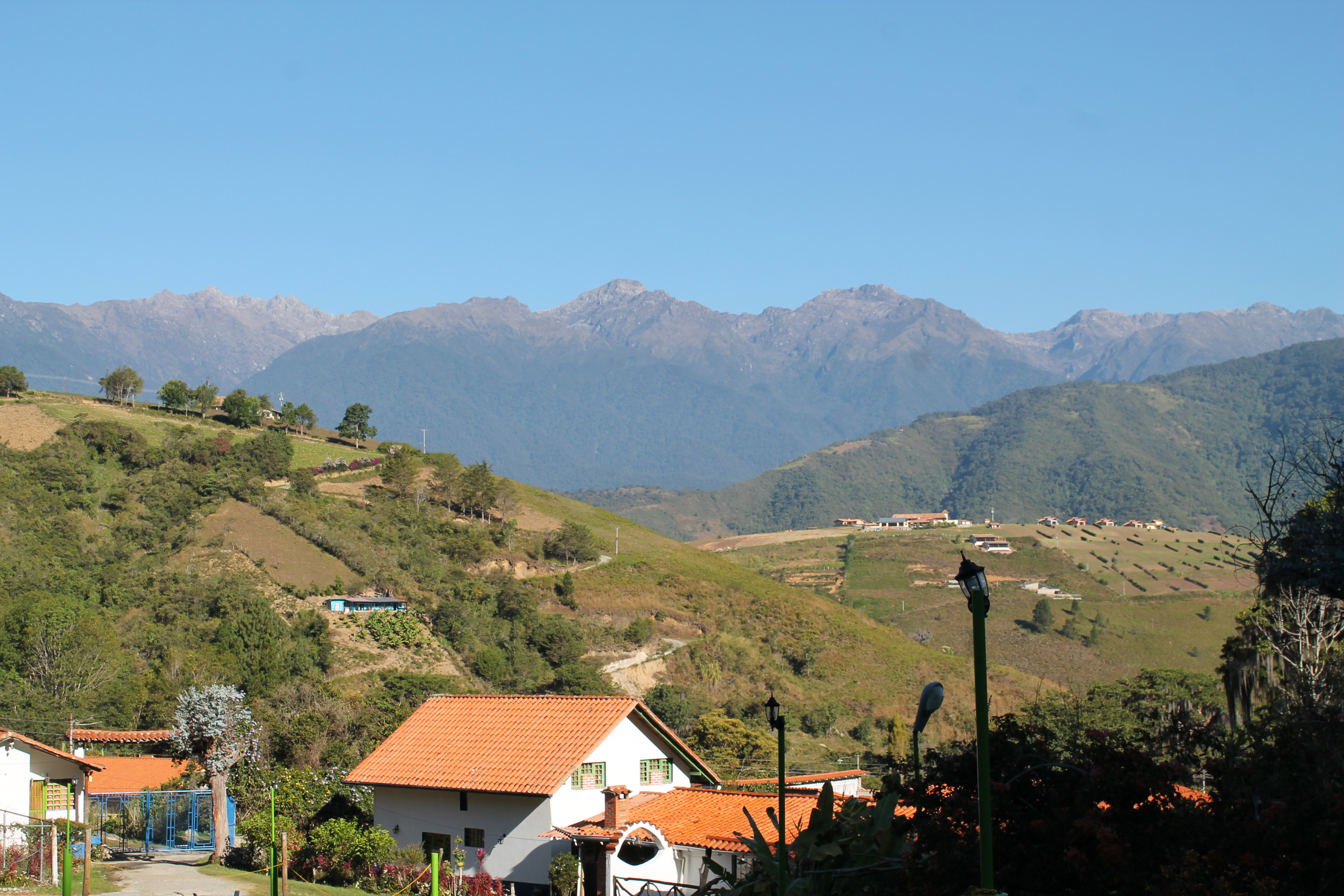
Tabay, Mérida State

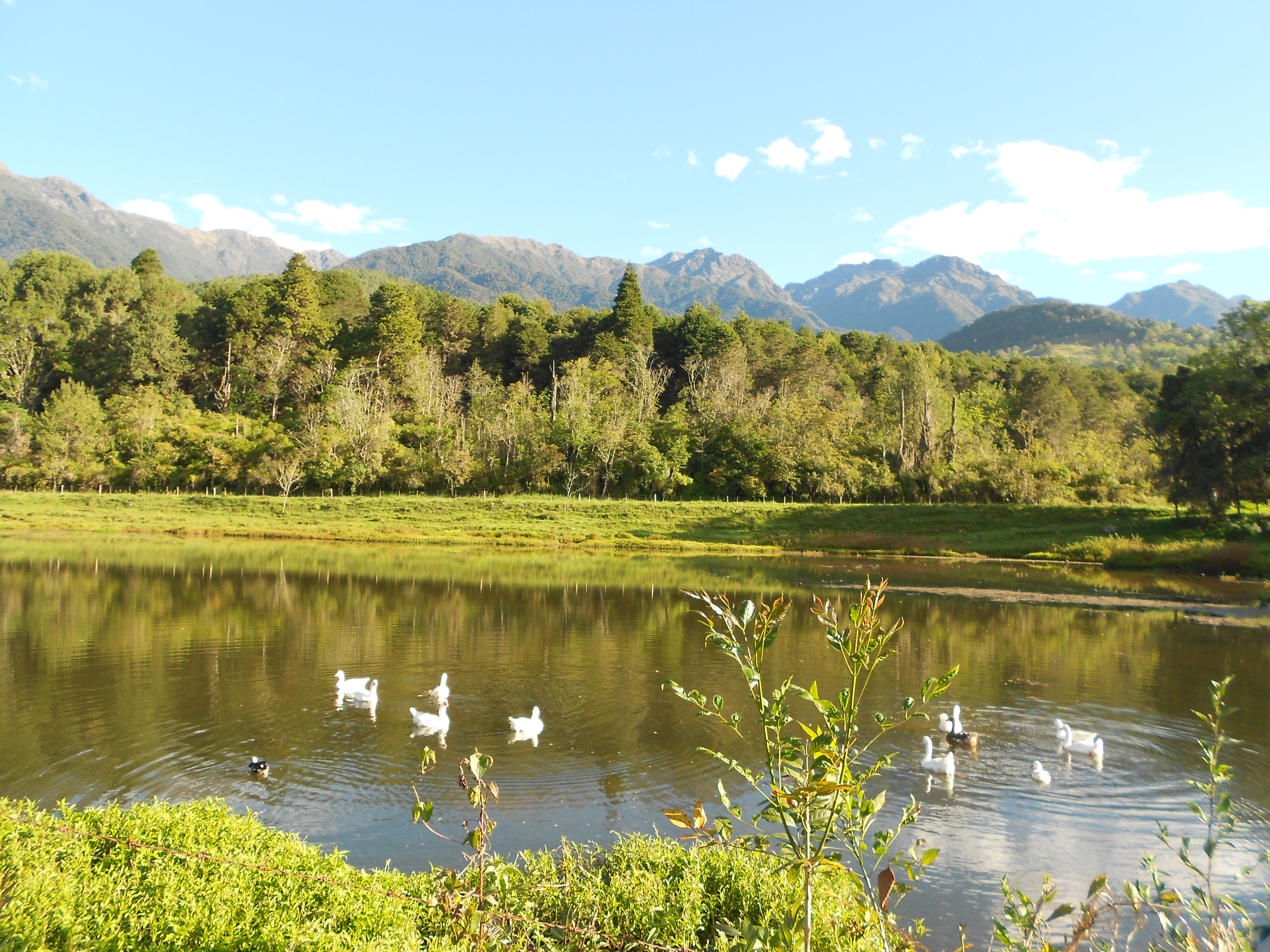
El Valle, Mérida State

Municipalities of Mérida

1. Alberto Adriani (El Vigía)
2. Andrés Bello (La Azulita)
3. Antonio Pinto Salinas (Santa Cruz de Mora)
4. Aricagua (Aricagua)
5. Arzobispo Chacón (Canagua)
6. Campo Elías (Ejido)
7. Caracciolo Parra Olmedo (Tucaní)
8. Cardenal Quintero (Santo Domingo)
9. Guaraque (Guaraque)
10. Julio César Salas (Arapuey)
11. Justo Briceño (Torondoy)
12. Libertador (Mérida)
13. Miranda (Timotes)
14. Obispo Ramos de Lora (Santa Elena de Arenales)
15. Padre Noguera (Santa María de Caparo)
16. Pueblo Llano (Pueblo Llano)
17. Rangel (Mucuchíes)
18. Rivas Dávila (Bailadores)
19. Santos Marquina (Tabay)
20. Sucre (Lagunillas)
21. Tovar (Tovar)
22. Tulio Febres Cordero (Nueva Bolivia)
23. Zea (Zea)

== Demographics ==
Historical population
Year	Pop.	±% p.a.
1873	67,489	—
1881	78,199	+1.86%
1891	87,852	+1.17%
1920	123,232	+1.17%
1926	150,128	+3.35%
1936	179,122	+1.78%
1941	192,994	+1.50%
1950	211,110	+1.00%
1961	270,668	+2.28%
1971	347,095	+2.52%
1981	459,361	+2.84%
1990	570,215	+2.43%
2001	715,268	+2.08%
2011	828,592	+1.48%
Source: "XIV CENSO NACIONAL DE POBLACIÓN Y VIVIENDA - Resultados por Entidad Federal y Municipio del Estado Mérida" (PDF). Instituto Nacional de Estadística.

The State of Merida has an estimated population of 1,025,445 inhabitants for the year 2018 according to the I.N.E., with a population density of 90.74 inhabitants/km^{2}, being the main urban agglomerations the Metropolitan Area of Merida with 508,988 inhabitants (49.6% total population), the City of El Vigia with 159,166 inhabitants (15.5% total population), the Conurbation of Tovar (Mocotíes Valley) with 104.817 inhabitants (10.2% total population) and the city of Nueva Bolivia-Caja Seca with 60,490 inhabitants, the latter being a bi-state agglomeration, as it is made up of two localities from different states.

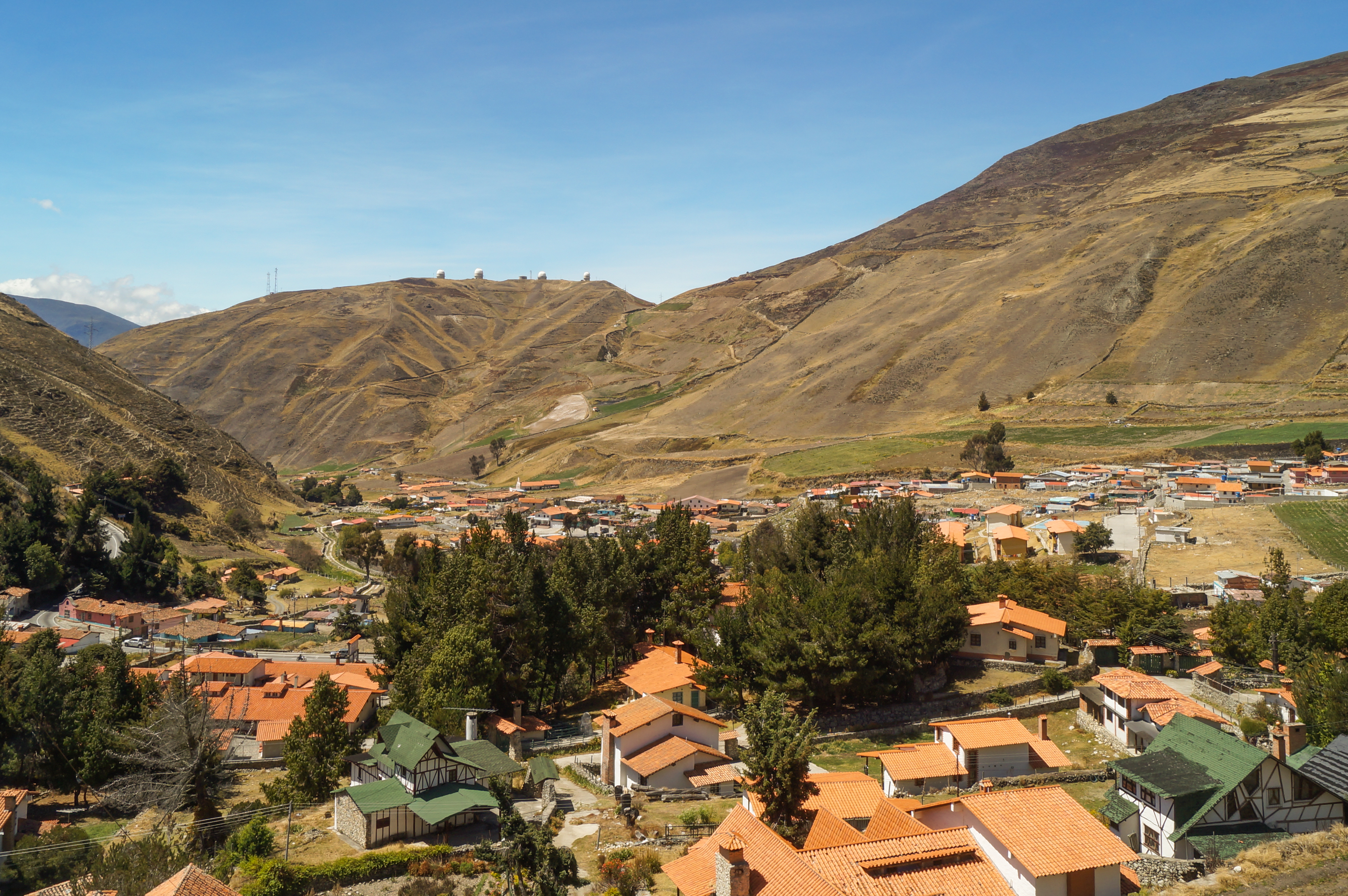
Apartaderos, Mérida

=== Race and ethnicity ===
According to the 2011 Census, the racial composition of the population was:

For Venezuelan Census:

Racial composition	Population	%
White	479,021	53.7
Moreno	352,151	42.5
Black	24,085	1.1
Other race	—N/a	2.7

== Economy ==
The main economic activities are agriculture, tourism, livestock, agribusiness, trout farming, service activities associated with the University of the Andes and the regional and national government. Merida is one of the great cultural, artisan and university centers of the country.

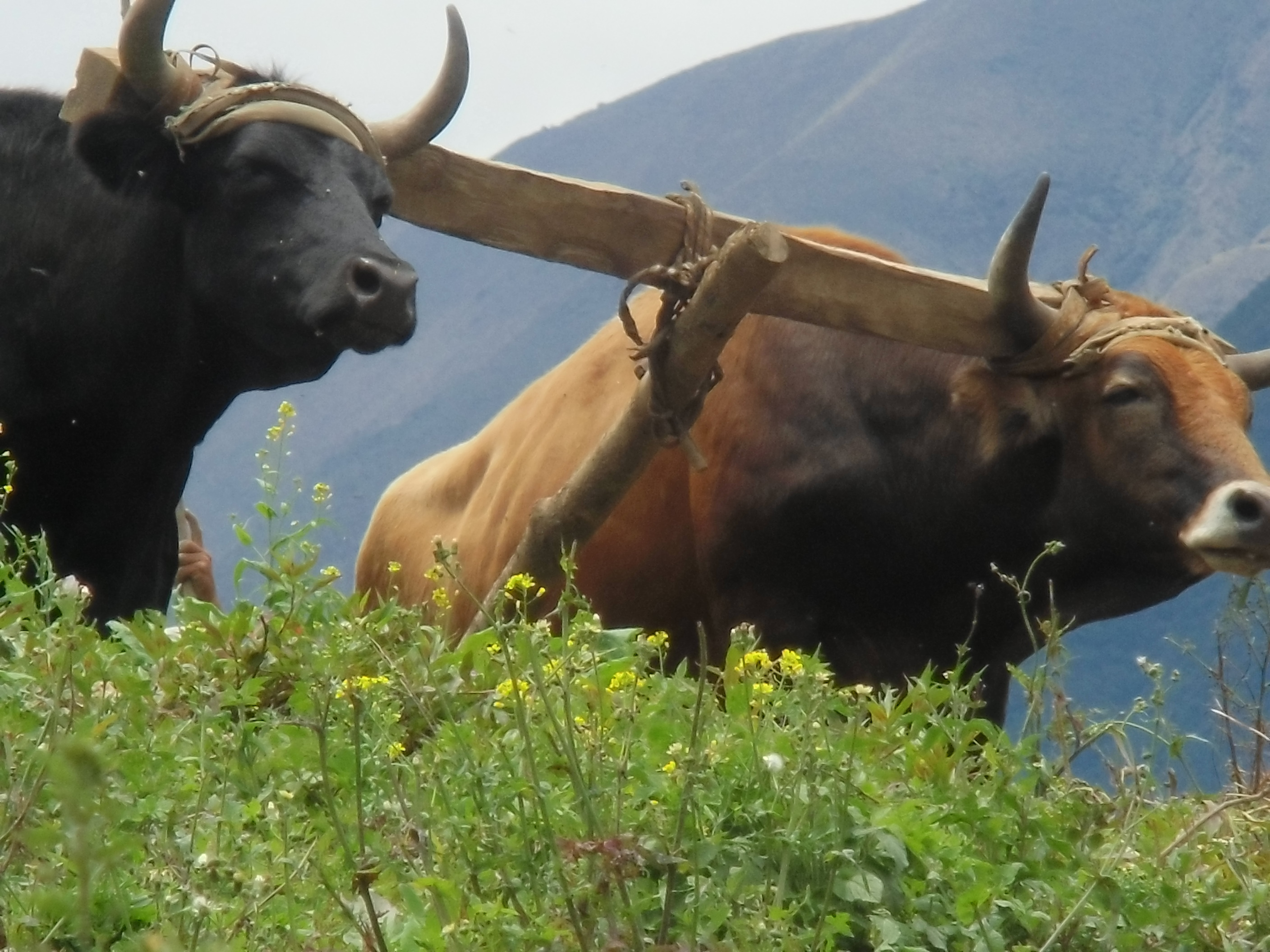
Cattle in the state of Merida

It is the first state producer of celery, potatoes, cauliflower, lettuce, carrots, garlic, beets and cabbage in the country. It also stands out for the cultivation of peas, cambures, bananas, caraotas, tomatoes, yucca, cocoa, and coffee.

In the livestock sector, highlights in cattle (meat), pigs and poultry. The fishing activity has acquired great importance through the breeding of trout in rivers, lagoons and streams.

The industries present in the entity are mainly: food products, clothing and domestic utensils. The tourist sector is very relevant, as it has a very good infrastructure.

There is a great variety of shops and services that also contribute to Merida's economy.

An important factor in the economy is a wide range of handcrafted articles, such as: wool fabrics in the manufacture of beautiful blankets, wood carvings of original sculptures, clay articles, typical sweets, wines, punches and handcrafted liquors made with fruits grown in the region. Most of the tourists acquire these products, generating an additional income to the state.

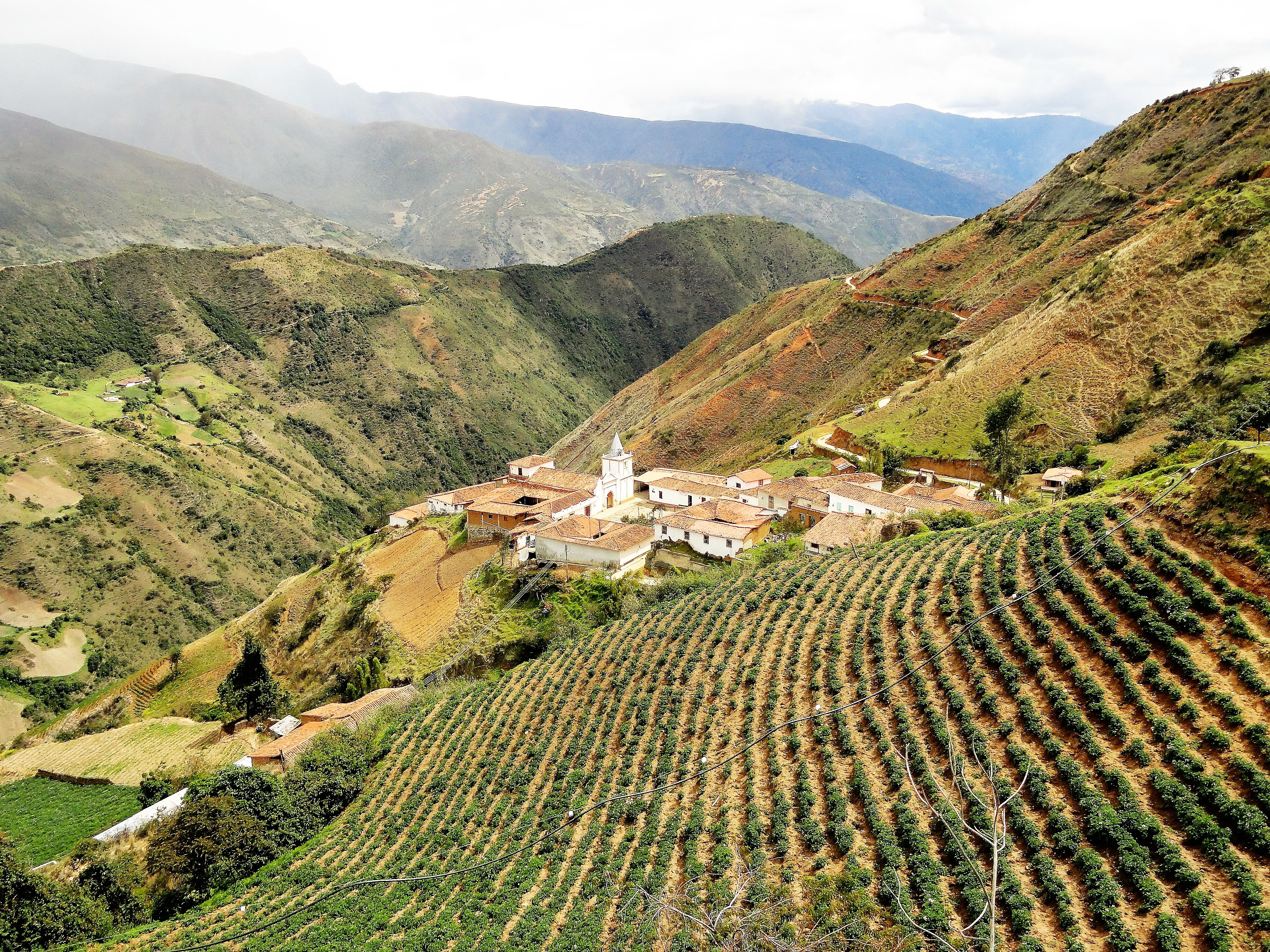
Agriculture in Los Nevados, a town in Merida

The economy is complemented by income from tourism. The cable car system, being the highest and longest in the world, attracts thousands of people every year who venture to climb to the vicinity of Pico Bolivar. In addition, Merida is rich in natural attractions, one only need to climb the trans-Andean highway to enjoy the beauty of the moor. For this, and many other reasons, it is one of the preferred tourist destinations for Venezuelans and foreigners.

Another important industry is the hotel industry. The entire state of Merida is equipped with an excellent hotel infrastructure. There are mountain hotels with cabin service, equipped with playgrounds, riding horses, artificial lakes for fishing and many other services that satisfy the most demanding tourists.

== Tourism ==
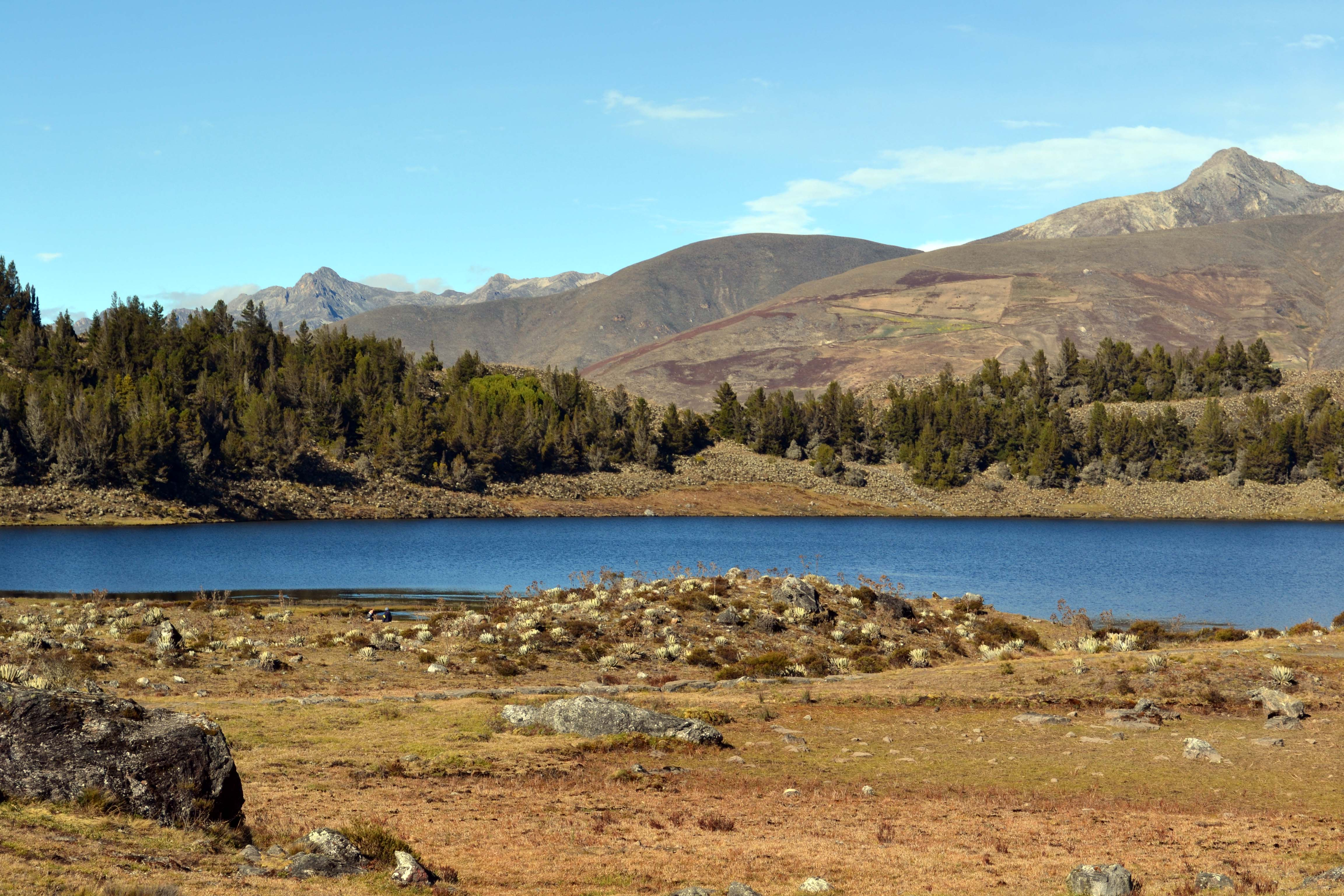
Mucubaji Lagoon, Mérida

=== Natural heritage ===
The State of Merida has a great amount of natural tourist attractions, which has characterized it as a tourist power of Venezuela. Its immense geographic diversity due to its transition between the Andes Region and the South Region of the Lake of Maracaibo gives it different climates and varied temperatures, propitious for each of the vacation tastes offering Mountain and Beach places in the same state.

Some natural attractions are:

==== National Parks ====
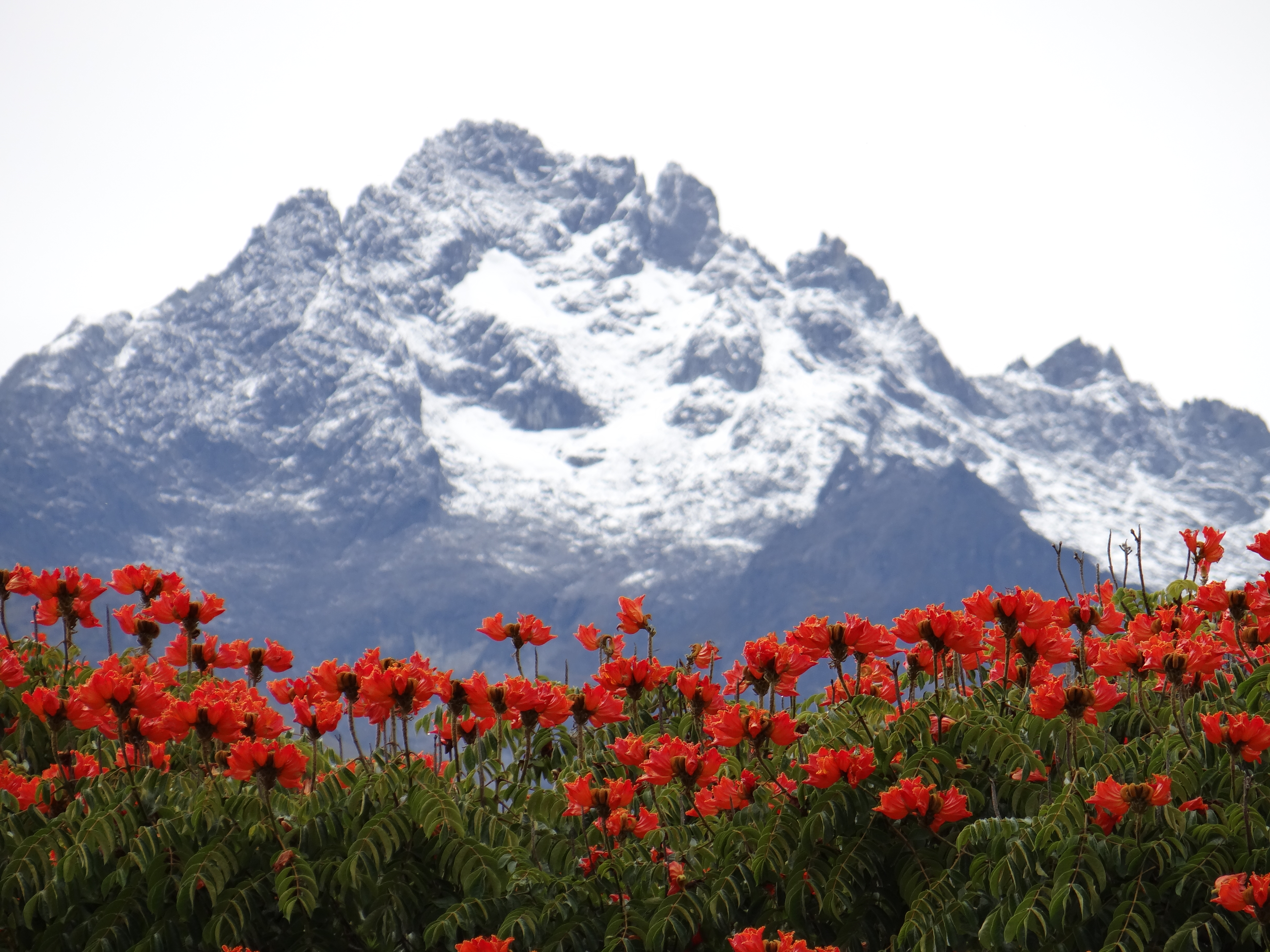
Pico Bolivar, the highest mountain in Venezuela

- Sierra Nevada National Park.
  - Pico Bolivar.
  - Pico Espejo.
  - Mucubají Lagoon.
  - Laguna Negra.
  - Santo Cristo Lagoon.
- Juan Pablo Peñaloza National Park
  - Páramo de Mariño.

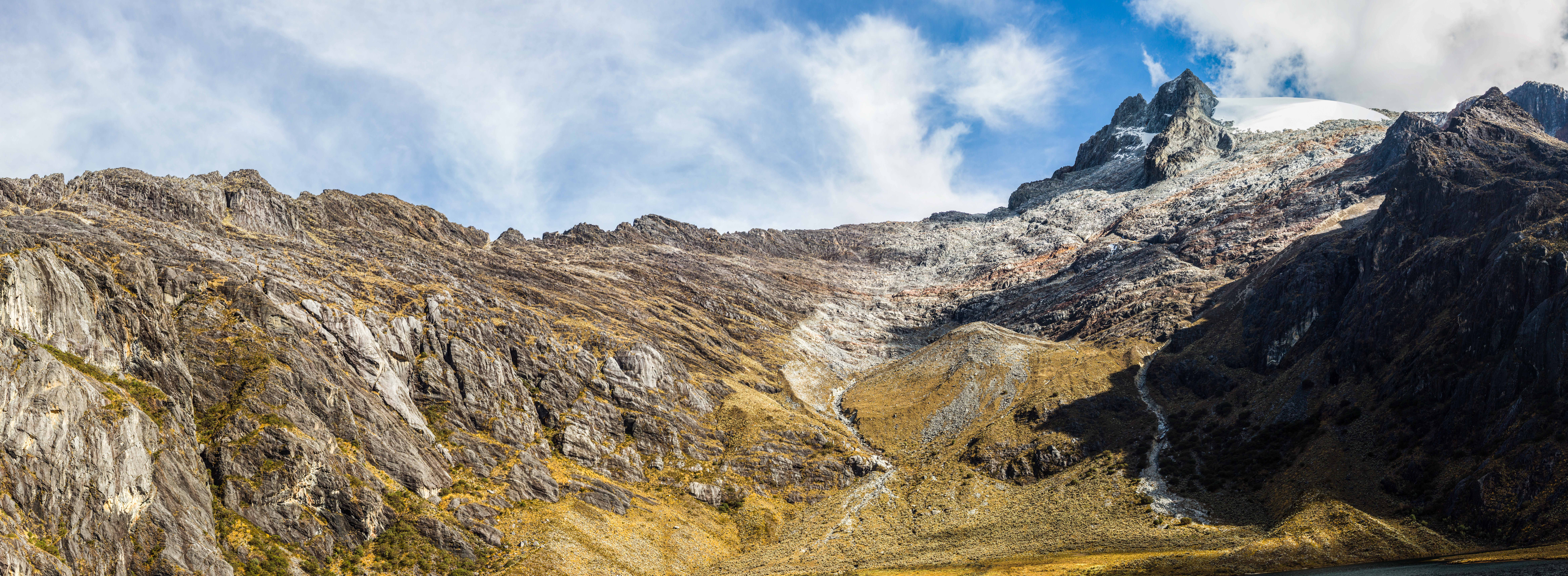
Humboldt Peak, Sierra Nevada of Mérida

  - Páramo de la Negra.
  - Las Palmas Lagoon.
  - Los Lirios Lagoon.
  - White Lagoon.
- Sierra de La Culata National Park
  - Collado del Condor (known as El Aguila Peak).
  - El Gavilán Peak.
  - Mucuñuque Peak.
  - El Condor Refuge.
  - Páramo de Mistafi.

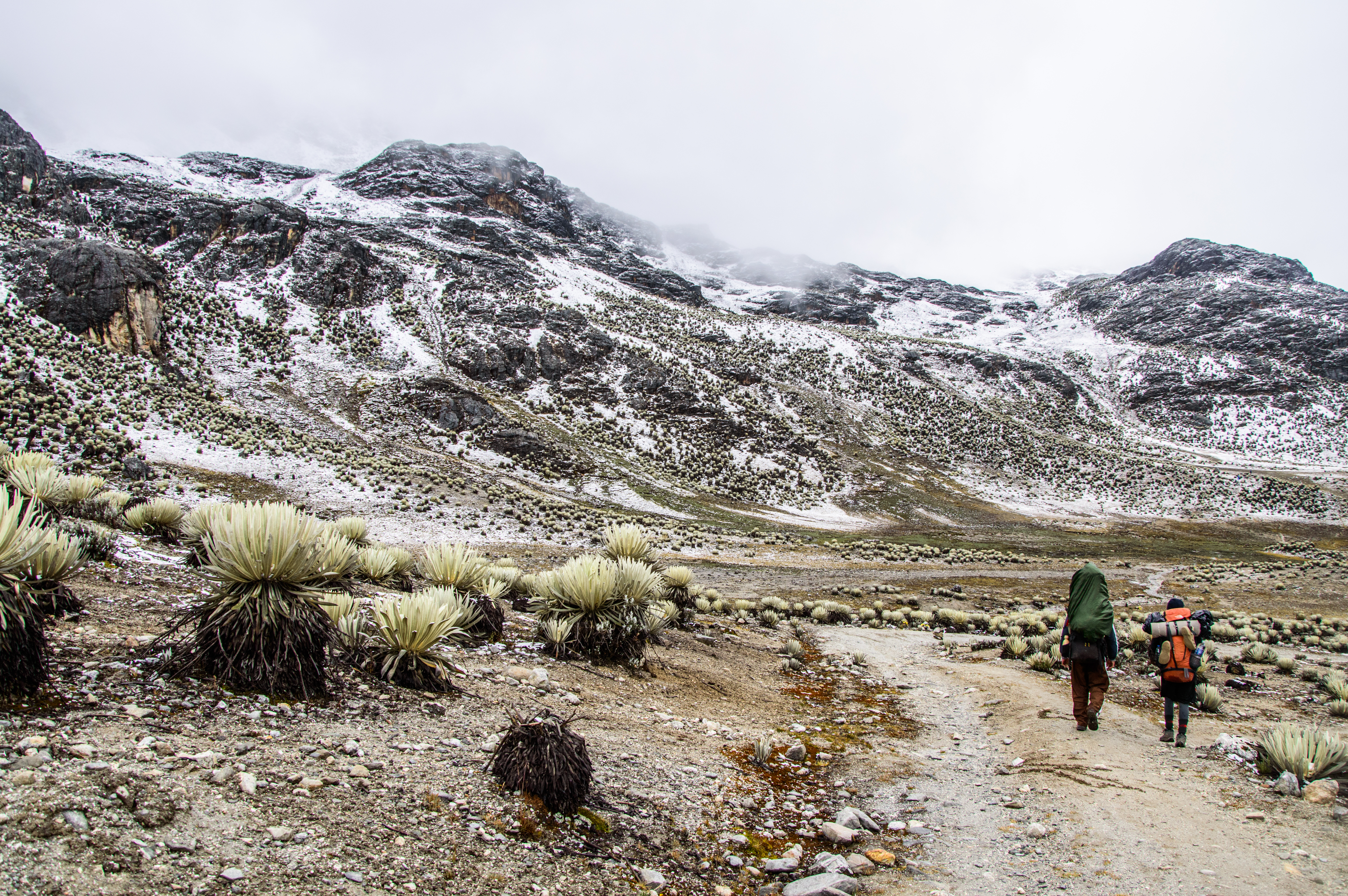
Mifafí Valley

  - Páramo de los Conejos
- Tapo-Caparo National Park
  - Caparo Forest Reserve.
  - Caparo Reservoir.

==== Natural Monuments ====
- Chorrera de las González Natural Monument.
- Natural Monument Laguna de Urao.
- Meseta la Galera Natural Monument

==== Regional Natural Parks ====
- Thermal waters of Chiguara.
- Thermal waters of Jají.
- Thermal waters of Tabay.
- Thermal waters of Santa Apolonia.
- Thermal waters of Quebrada de las Tapias Valley.
- Natural Park Cascada De La India Carú.
- El Guayabal Waterfall Natural Park.
- Bath of Palmarito.
- Bath of Cucuchica.

=== Built heritage ===
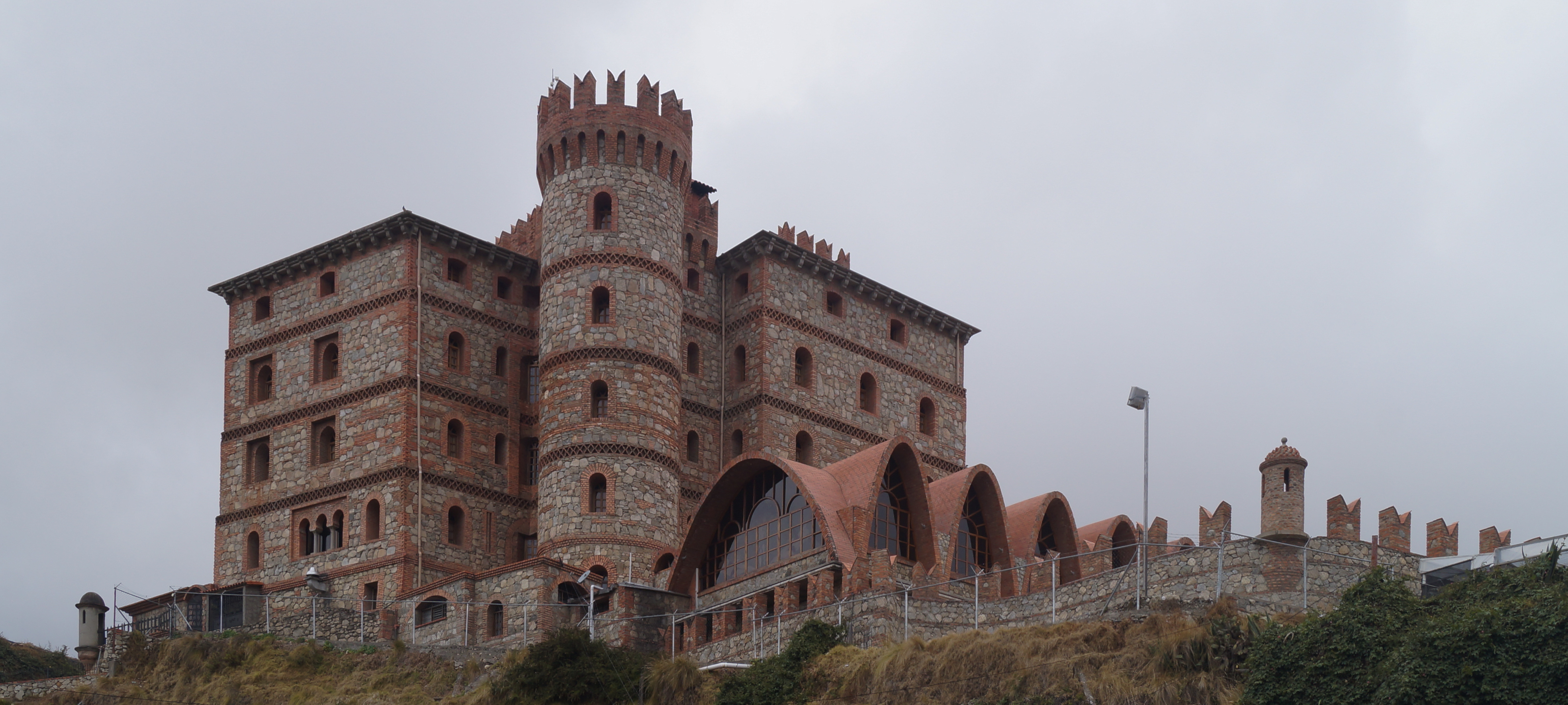
San Ignacio Castle, Mérida State

==== Theme Parks and Tourist Complexes ====
- Theme park La Venezuela de Antier.
- Theme Park The Mountain of Dreams.
- Theme Park The Dogs.
- EcoWild Tourist Complex.
- Lusitano Theme Park.
- Zoo Park Chorros de Milla.
- Park Aquarium Garden Merida.
- Museum of Science and Technology of Merida.
- Los Andes Tourist Complex: La Isla Park and Mucumbarila International Convention Center.
- Vegasol Tourist Complex.

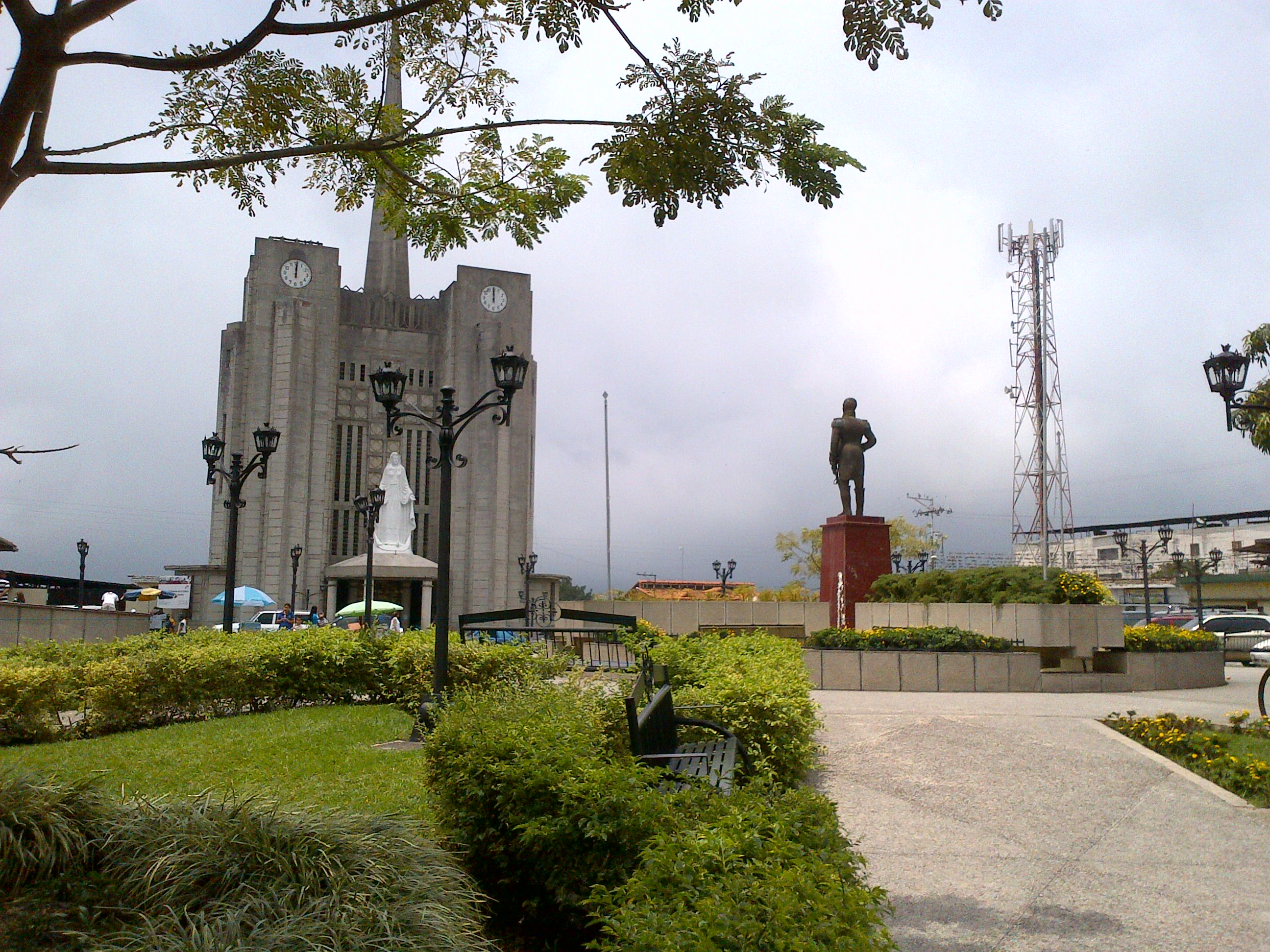
Catholic Church in La Azulita, Mérida

==== Museums and Cultural Centers ====
- Rectorate of the University of Los Andes: Aula Magna
- Museo Arqueológico de Mérida
- César Rengifo Theater
- School of Music at the University of Los Andes: La Otra Banda Art Gallery.
- Archbishop's Palace of Merida: Archdiocesan Museum.
- La Victoria Estate: Immigrant and Coffee Museum (Santa Cruz de Mora).
- Colonial Art Museum.
- Science and Technology Museum.
- Modern Art Museum Juan Astorga Anta.
- Museum of Art of Tovar Jose Lorenzo Alvarado.
- Immaculate Conception Museum
- Marian Picon Salas Museum.
- Cultural Center Tulio Febres Cordero, Merida.
- Marian Picon Salas Cultural Center, El Vigia.
- Elbano Méndez Osuna Cultural Center, Tovar.
- Carlos Febres Pobeda Cultural Center, Merida.
- Casa Bosset.
- House of Culture Juan Felix Sanchez.
- House of the Governors.
- Bolivarian Library of Merida.
- Bolivarian House of Dancers.
- Plaza de Toros Coliseo el Llano, Tovar: Museo Histórico Taurino de Tovar, Museo de Arte Contemporáneo and sub-home of the Mérida State Youth Symphony Orchestra.
- Plaza de Toros Monumental Román Eduardo Sandia, Merida: *Bullfighting Museum of Merida.

==== Buildings and Monuments ====
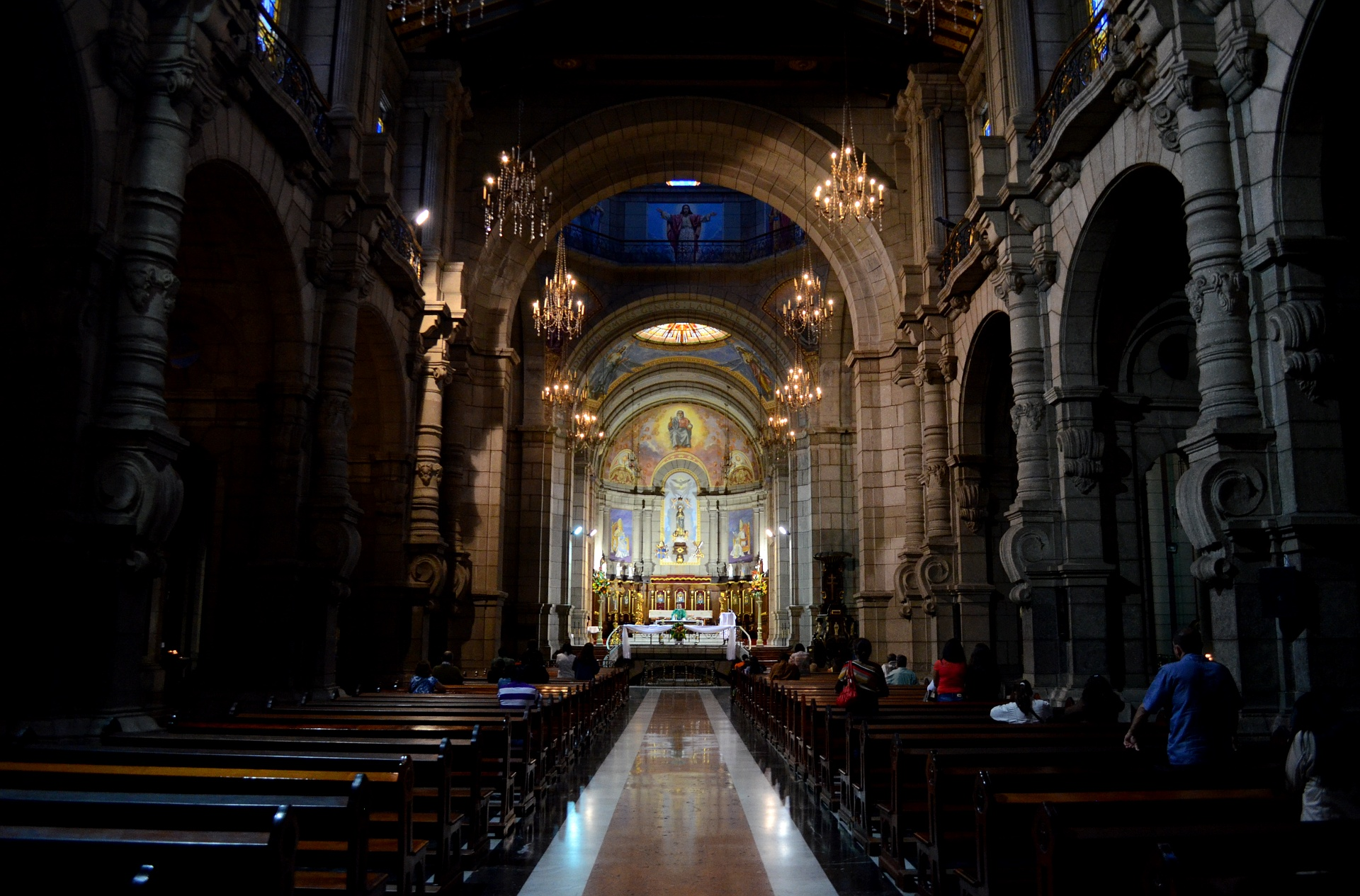
Mérida Cathedral

- Metropolitan Cathedral of Merida: Basilica Menor de Nuestra Señora de la Inmaculada
- Santa Lucia Minor Basilica, Timotes.
- Diocesan Sanctuary of Our Lady of Regla, Tovar.
- Diocesan Shrine of Our Lady of Candelaria, Dancers.
- Diocesan Sanctuary of Our Lady of the Immaculate, La Azulita.
- Monument to the Condor of the Andes: in commemoration of Bolivar's passage through the Collado del Condor.
- Monument to Christ the King of La Galera in the city of Tovar.
- Monument to the Column of Bolívar.
- Castle of San Ignacio.
- Monument to the Crazy Light Caraballo.
- Chapel of the Virgin of Coromoto stone

==== Others ====
- Merida's Cable Car Tourist Transport System. (Mukumbari)
- Museum of Science and Technology.
- National Astronomical Observatory of Llano del Hato of the Astronomy Research Center.
- Coromoto Ice Cream Factory.
- Merida's Main Market.
- Trucha-cultura.

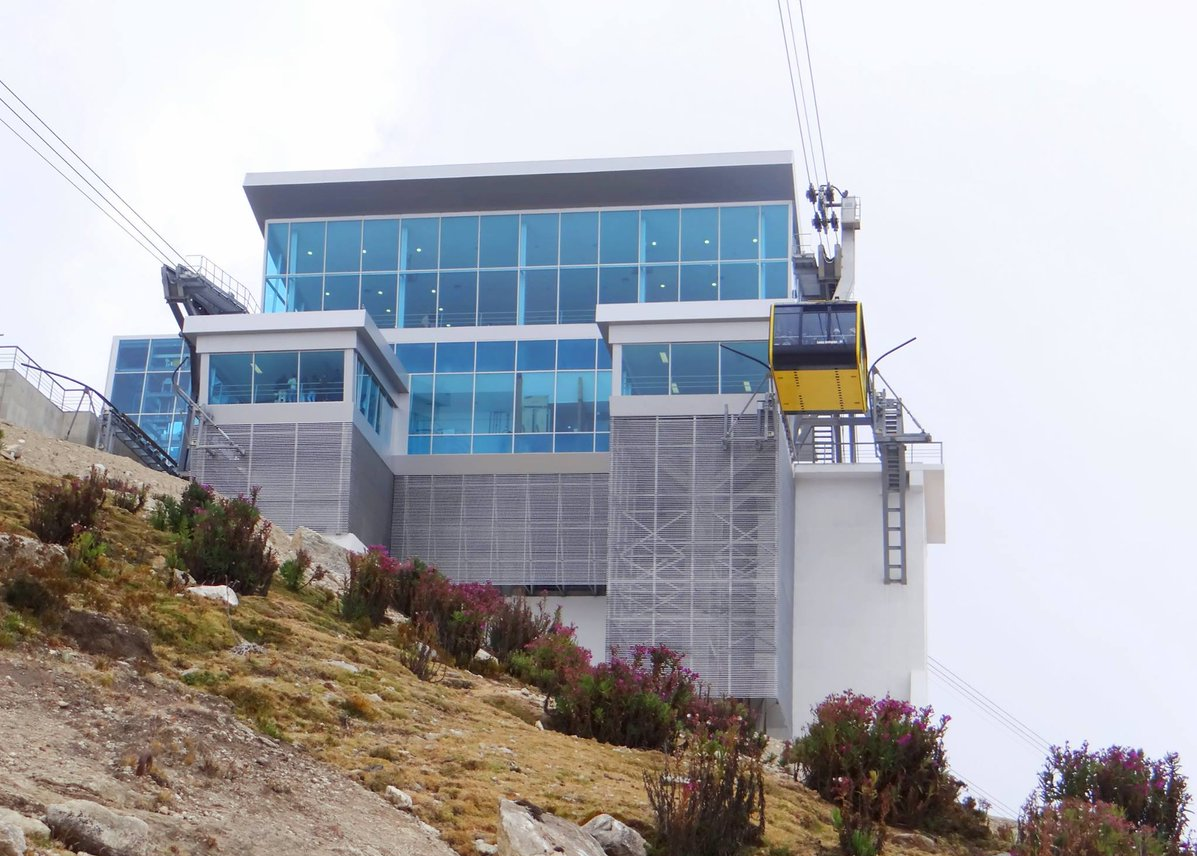
Mérida Cable Car

== Education ==
The state of Merida is an entity with an important percentage of its population within the classrooms, its capital for example has between 20 and 30% of the population doing university studies and a literacy rate of 97%. It has one of the most traditional universities in the country, and the second oldest one: the University of Los Andes. In addition, different institutions of higher education are located in Merida, such as universities, university centers, polytechnic institutes, and university colleges, among others.

=== Initial, basic, medium and diversified education ===
Basic and secondary education has a large number of institutions, mostly public, depending on both the national and state governments. Among these we have "Escuela Básica Rafael Antonio Godoy" "Liceo Antonio Nicolas Rangel", Dr. Armando González Puccini "Liceo Libertador and the Liceo Caracciolo Parra in Mérida, the Liceo Alberto Adriani in El Vigía, the Liceo de Ejido in the city of the same name, the Liceo José Nucete Sardi in Tovar, just to name a few. In addition, there is an important number of private schools maintained by Catholic organizations, some of which have the greatest educational infrastructure such as Colegio "Sagrada Familia", Colegio La Salle in Mérida, Colegio San Luis, Colegio Seráfico and Colegio Fátima in the capital city.

Other model educational institutions, which should be highlighted, are the language, sports and music schools. Important music conservatories, orchestras and choirs are based in the city. These depend mostly on the universities or the State within the framework of the Symphonic Orchestra System, and teach how to play multiple musical instruments, as well as instruct in lyrical interpretation and voice development. The most important language schools are those that teach English and, to a lesser extent, French and Italian.

=== University education ===
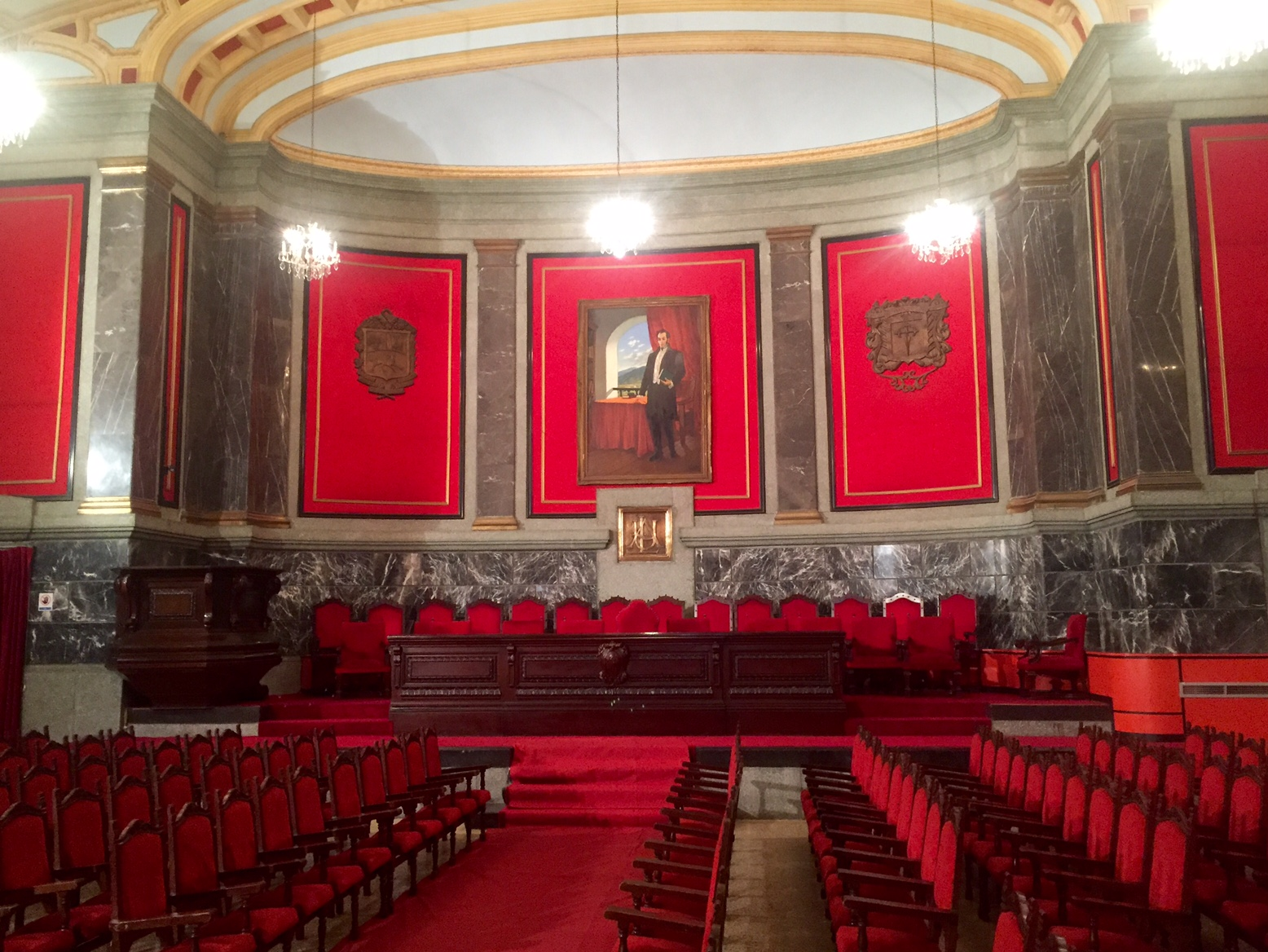
Aula Magna, University of Los Andes (ULA)

The University of Los Andes, the most relevant in the region, offers undergraduate programs in various artistic areas, health sciences, forestry, science and technology, engineering, legal sciences, social sciences and economics, literature and humanities, between short and long careers, as well as courses, undergraduate, graduate, specializations, diplomas, among others, so it brings together more than 40.000 students and 6,000 teachers; this is divided into 3 nuclei within the state, in the cities of Merida, El Vigía and Tovar, in the case of the capital city is distributed in 4 complexes: "Pedro Rincón Gutierrez" (La Hechicera), La Liria, "Ciclo Básico" (Los Chorros) and the Campo de Oro, and more than one faculty watered by all the geography of the same as Medicine, Dentistry and Arts, established since 1785 in Merida.

Another house of studies of great importance is the Universidad Politécnica Territorial de Mérida Kléber Ramírez, formerly known as the Instituto Universitario Tecnológico de Ejido (IUTE), has its headquarters in the city of Ejido, was founded on November 25, 1981 by the national executive and raised to the rank of National Experimental University, changing its name to the current one on February 14, 2012. It also has extensions in the cities of Tucaní, Tovar and Bailadores.

The other two universities that operate in the city are of more recent creation, being the UNA that offers distance learning undergraduate degrees and the UNEFA, a military university that operates in the city since 2006 and also offers undergraduate degrees related to the engineering field.

The main university centres are:

- Universidad de Los Andes, ULA. (Mérida, El Vigía and Tovar)
- Universidad Politécnica Territorial de Mérida UPT (Ejido, El Vigía, Tucaní, Tovar and Bailadores)
- Universidad Nacional Abierta, UNA. (Mérida and Tovar)
- Universidad Nacional Experimental de las Fuerzas Armadas, UNEFA. (Mérida and Tovar)
- Universidad Bolivariana de Venezuela, UBV. (23 municipalities)
- Universidad Nacional Experimental Simón Rodríguez, UNESR. (El Vigía)
- Universidad Pedagógica Experimental Libertador, UPEL. (Mérida, El Vigía and Zea)

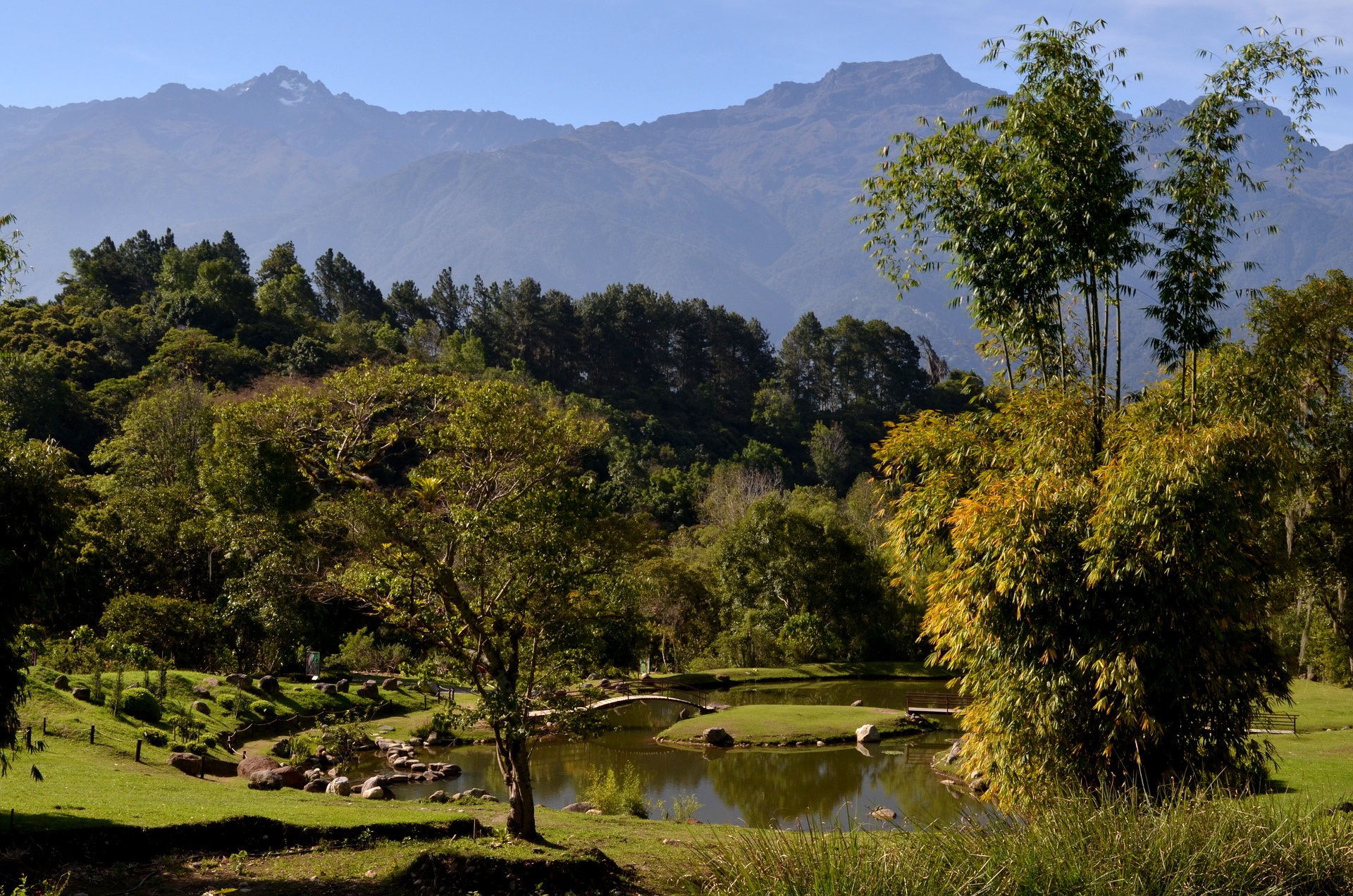
Los Andes University Botanical Garden

- Universidad Nacional Experimental del Sur del Lago, UNESUR. (Santa Cruz de Mora)
- Instituto Universitario Politécnico Santiago Mariño, IUPSM. (Mérida)
- Colegio Universitario Hotel Escuela de Los Andes Venezolanos, CUHELAV. (Mérida)
- Instituto Santiago de los Caballeros de Mérida, ISCM. (Mérida)
- Instituto Universitario de Tecnología Antonio José de Sucre, IUTAJS. (Mérida)
- Instituto Tecnológico Universitario Cristóbal Mendoza. (Mérida and El Vigía)
- Instituto Tecnológico de La Frontera, IUFRONT. (Mérida)

=== Libraries ===
The largest network of libraries is constituted by the libraries of the University of Los Andes, each faculty has a library specialized in its area, in addition to the centralized libraries of the university nucleus "Pedro Rincón Gutierrez" of La Hechicera, known as BIACI (Integrated Library of Architecture, Sciences and Engineering), the direction of sports, the administrative headquarters and other smaller libraries that add up to more than a dozen sites under the organization of Serbiula. In addition, the ULA has the largest amount of study and research material in digital form in the whole country, available to the public, as well as several newspaper libraries, among which the newspaper library of the faculty of the same name with one of the largest collections in Latin America stands out.

In addition to the university libraries, the city is home to the Bolivarian Library, which also serves as an exhibition gallery, a branch of the National Library of Venezuela, and the Simón Bolívar Central Public Library, which depends on the regional government. Other public and private institutions such as schools, high schools, churches and language institutes have smaller libraries often for the exclusive use of their members.

A final metropolitan library was to be added to the list in 2006, however, the headquarters that would be used for it was transferred to UNEFA and has not yet been granted new space.

Instituto Autónomo de Bibliotecas e Información del Estado Mérida is a regional agency that is responsible for libraries in Mérida.

== Science and technology ==
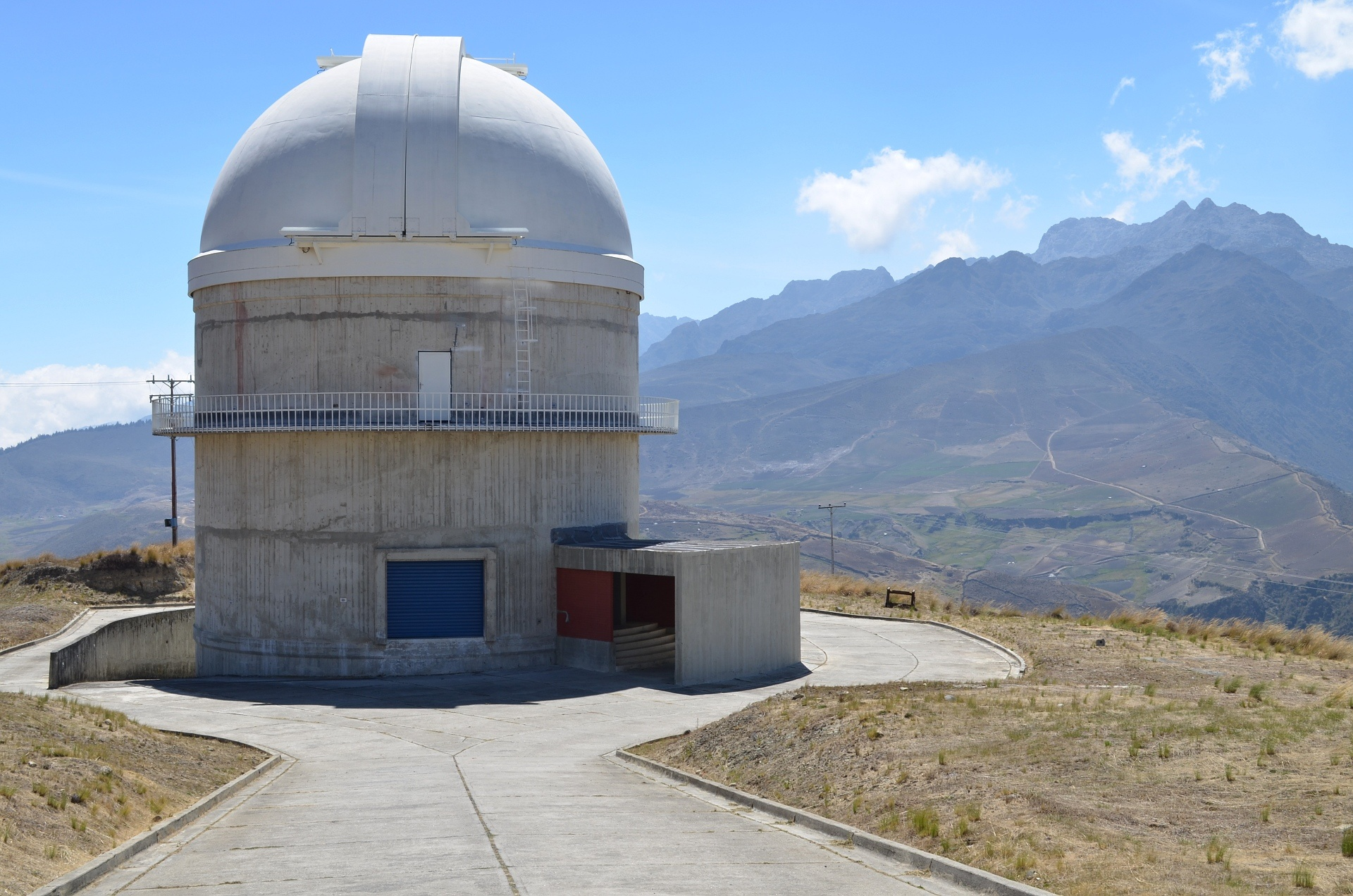
Llano del Hato National Observatory

The State of Merida is a scientific and technological entity par excellence, an activity that derives largely from the presence of multiple houses of higher education, as well as the contribution of public institutions such as IVIC and Fundacite, which have generated significant progress through research, development of new technologies and scientific work.

The metropolitan area of Mérida has been characterized by being the national spearhead for research, innovation, development of new technologies and application of the scientific method, since Mérida is the only Venezuelan city whose indexes of professionals and researchers are at the levels suggested by UNESCO,9 which led to the decree of the so-called Free Cultural, Scientific and Technological Zone of the State of Mérida on July 14, 1995, published in the Official Gazette of the Republic of Venezuela No. 4,937 Extraordinary of the same year 10

=== IVIC-Merida ===
The Venezuelan Institute for Scientific Research (IVIC) located in the State of Merida (IVIC-Merida) includes the Multidisciplinary Center for Science (CMC). IVIC-Merida has two headquarters, one located in the municipality of Libertador, and the other in the municipality of Campo Elias. The latter is a few kilometers from Jají, precisely in the community Loma de Los Guamos, in the parish of Jají. The Laboratory of Sensory Ecology (LabEcoSen) has been operating there since 2008, and since May 2013 the Unit of Community Articulation (UniArco). These teams bring together multidisciplinary personnel who focus their efforts on various fundamental and applied themes related to multiple disciplines such as agro-ecology, health, environment, agriculture and politics, without losing sight of the social relevance of the research topics.

== Health System ==
The state of Merida is one of the seven states in the country that signed the agreement to decentralize the health sector in 1992, under the provisions of the Constitution of the state of Merida, now the Constitution of the Bolivarian State of Merida (amended in 2014), is in charge of the Health Corporation of the Bolivarian State of Merida, which in turn is subdivided into Health Districts, which are distributed according to geographical location, population density and existing health centres, as well as Autonomous Health Institutes such as the Los Andes University Hospital, FarmaMérida, Nutrition and Food, Health Plan, Social Development and Sor Juana Inés de la Cruz Hospital; The regional public health system is not the only one since there are parallel systems, both public, mixed and private, such as the Venezuelan Institute of Social Security, which has administrative offices and a hospital, the health system of the University of Los Andes: It has the Institute for Teacher Prevention (APULA IPP) and the Center for Comprehensive Medical Care (CAMIULA), the Institute for Protection and Social Assistance of the Educational Teaching Profession (IPASME) under the National Executive and another of the Regional Executive, the Military Pavilion attached to the MPPDS, Public Health Laboratories attached to the National Institute of Hygiene "Rafael Rangel" as well as private health systems operating within the territory.

=== Health Corporation ===
The Health Corporation was founded on August 14, 1995, according to Official Gazette No. 04 Extraordinary of the Government of the State of Merida, with the mission and vision to promote health and prevent disease in the population of Merida, which are assigned 6 Health Districts and 23 Healthy Municipalities, its stewardship is in charge of the Director General of the entity under the supervision of the Board of Directors, in this institution operate various health programs and coordination of areas and services in health which administer the destinies of the health system in the state of Merida.

=== Health Districts ===
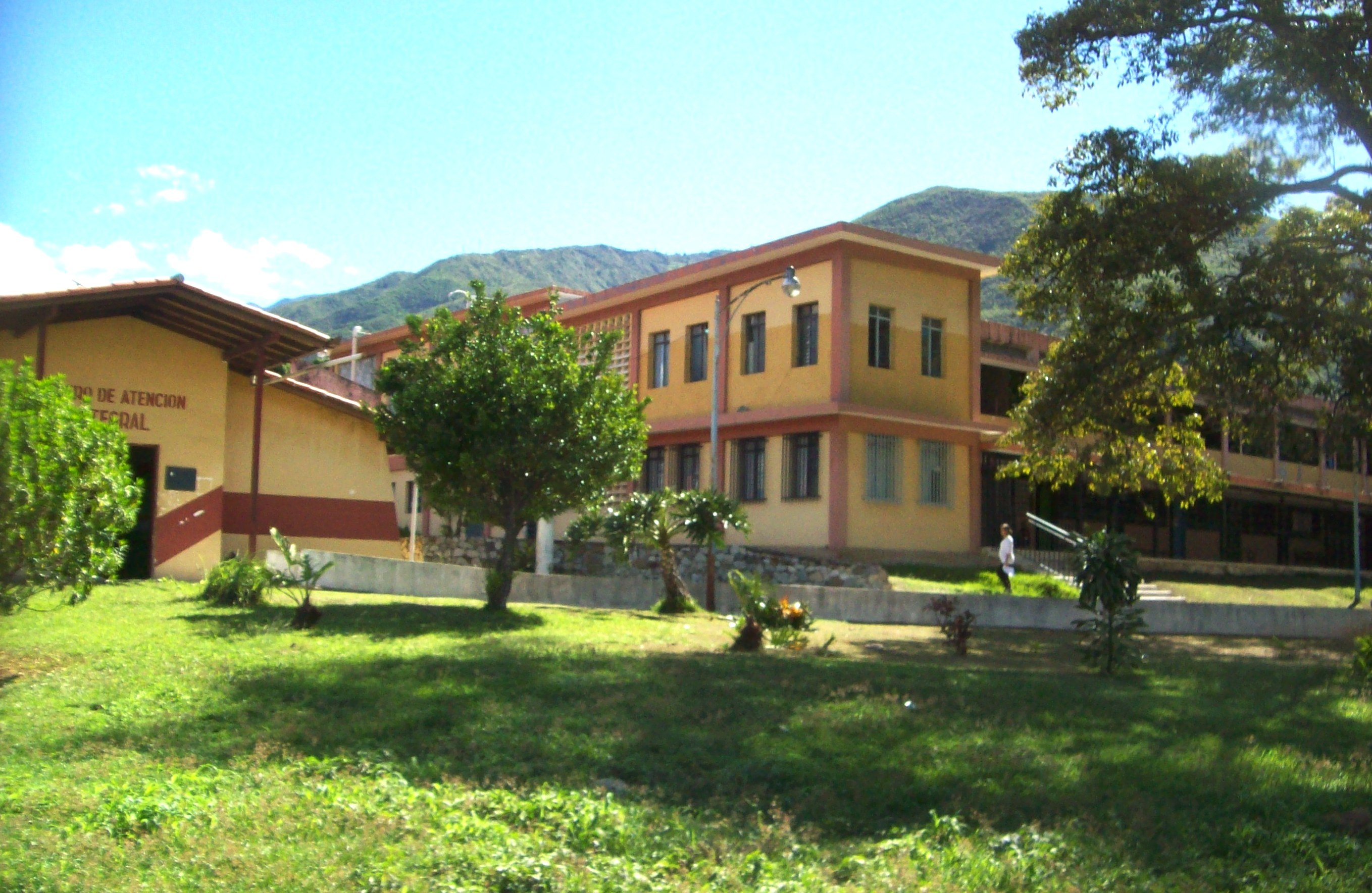
San José Hospital, Tovar, Mérida State

The health system in the state of Merida is divided into six regions or health districts, which are responsible for planning prevention and promotion activities, as well as human resources management, economic resource management, and health center coordination.

- Merida Health District: Municipalities of Libertador, Campo Elias, Santos Marquina, and Aricagua.
- El Vigía Health District: Municipalities Alberto Adriani, Bishop Ramos de Lora and Andrés Bello.
- Tovar Healthcare District: Municipalities of Tovar, Antonio Pinto Salinas, Rivas Dávila, Zea and Guaraque.
- Tucaní Healthcare District: Municipalities of Caracciolo Parra and Olmedo, Tulio Febres-Cordero, Julio César Salas and Justo Briceño.
- Lagunillas Sanitary District: Municipalities of Sucre, Archbishop Chacón and Padre Noguera
- Mucuchies Sanitary District: Municipalities Rangel, Miranda, Cardenal Quintero and Pueblo Llano

=== General Hospitals ===
- University Hospital of Los Andes: it is an autonomous institute attached to the Government of the State of Merida, has 483 beds, more than 33 medical specialties, basic and specialized imaging services, nutrition service, hospital and social pharmacy service, basic and specialized clinical laboratory services, research and teaching units, legal medicine and morgue, special care units and long-stay unit.
- Sor Juana Inés de La Cruz Hospital: formerly attached to the Archdiocese of Merida, it is located at the second level of medical care, has 3 operating rooms, 85 beds, diagnostic support and assistance services.
- Hospital "Dr. Tulio Carnevalli Salvatierra" of the IVSS: it is an infrastructure of Health belonging to the Venezuelan Institute of Social Security, is located in the second level of medical attention and has an important place beds, as well as diverse medical specialties and services of support diagnosis and assistance.
- San Juan de Dios Hospital: It is a Comprehensive Health Care Center that operates as a Type III Specialty Hospital, located at the third level of mental health care. It is part of the Preventive-Assistance Network of the Regional Mental Health Program, cooperating with Corposalud Mérida and the University of Los Andes.
- General Hospital of El Vigía: (Under construction) According to information from the Ministry, it is being built with the intention of opening a complete emergency room for adult and pediatric patients, as well as two operating rooms, an X-ray room, a clinical laboratory, a hospitalization service for adults and children, maternal and infant care, obstetrics, neonatal care, imaging and a blood distribution center, as well as 52 beds, staff areas, electrical plants, and a medicinal gas system.
- Hospital II El Vigía: in the past it was the main hospital infrastructure of the city of El Vigía, at present it has been displaced by the General Hospital, it has three operating rooms for general and specialized surgeries, it has been characterized by the traumatological attention, it has 150 hospital beds.
- Hospital II "San José" of Tovar: it is the main hospital infrastructure of the Mocotíes Valley, it has 115 beds, general emergency, cold room for morgue, and more than 10 medical specialties.

== Transport ==
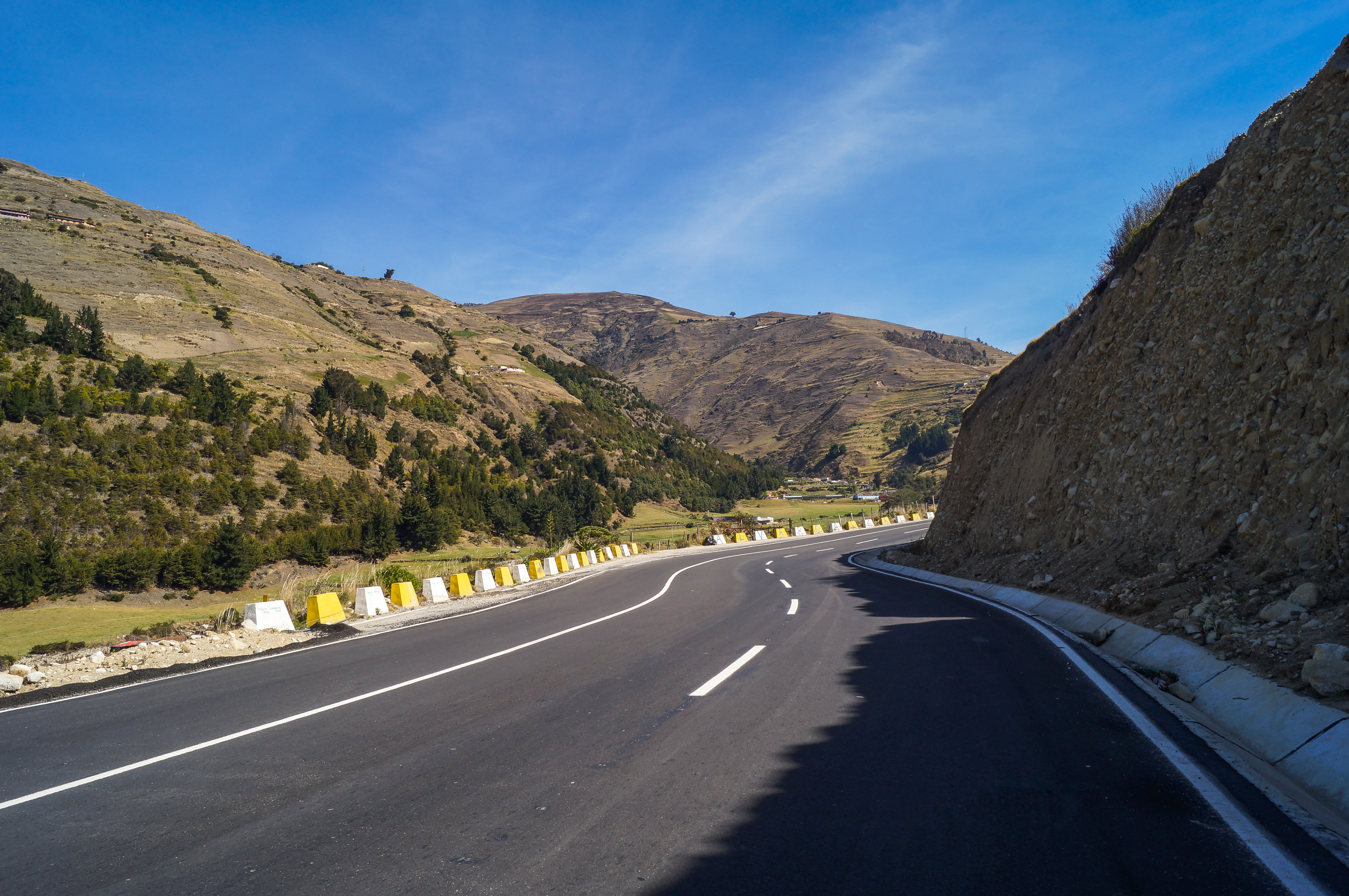
Road in the municipality of Rangel

The State of Merida is bounded by the States of Zulia, Trujillo, Tachira and Barinas, in the west of Venezuela, which allows any traveler to arrive by land through a series of roads that connect it with the states mentioned above:

- Northern Trasandina Road: this road artery connects the states of Lara, Portuguesa and Trujillo with the populations of Timotes, Chachopo, Apartaderos, San Rafael de Mucuchíes, Mucucuchíes, Mucuruba, Tabay, Mérida and Ejido.
- Barinas-Mérida road: through this road artery the western plains (Cojedes, Portuguesa and Barinas States) are communicated with the towns of Pueblo Llano, Santo Domingo, Apartaderos, San Rafael de Mucuchíes, Mucuchíes, Mucuruba, Tabay, Mérida and Ejido.
- Southern Trasandina Road: this section of the so-called Trasandina connects the capital of the state of Merida with the state of Tachira and the Republic of Colombia, crossing the towns of Ejido, Villa Libertad, San Juan de Lagunillas, Lagunillas, Llano El Anis, Chiguara, Estanques, Santa Cruz de Mora, Tovar, La Playa and Bailadores.
- Pan American Highway: the National Trunk 1 that links the Capital District, Miranda State, Aragua State, Carabobo State, Yaracuy State, Lara State, Trujillo State, Zulia State with Merida State and in turn with Táchira State and the Republic of Colombia, forming part of the Pan American Highway of Venezuela. For the state of Merida runs through the towns of Arapuey, Nueva Bolivia, Tucaní, Santa Elena de Arenales and El Vigía.

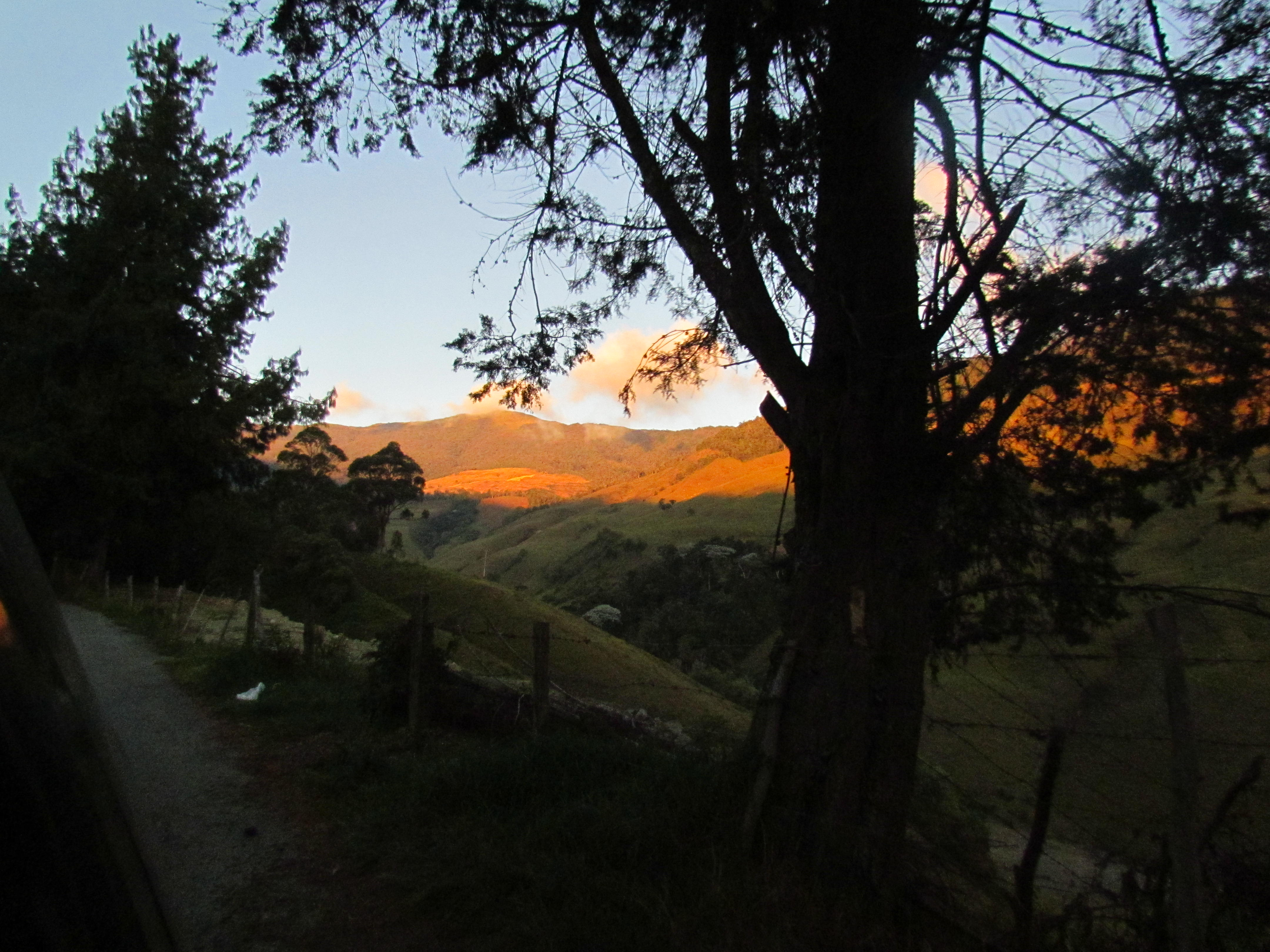
View from Via Canagua - El Molino

In addition to these roads, the 2 main localities of the state as the cities of Merida (State Capital) and El Vigia (Economic Capital) are connected by the Rafael Caldera Highway, in a stretch of 60 km at an average speed of 100 km / h.

=== Land terminals ===
- José Antonio Paredes Passenger Terminal: is the largest land transport station in the state, it is located on Las Américas Avenue in the city of Merida, and has inter-municipal departures to all the municipal capitals of the state of Merida such as Lagunillas, El Vigía, Tovar, Santa Cruz de Mora, Mucuchíes, La Azulita, Timotes and Santo Domingo Pueblo Llano, as well as national departures to San Cristóbal, Cabimas, Ciudad Ojeda, Maracaibo, Santa Bárbara del Zulia, Caja Seca, Trujillo, Boconó, Valera, Barinas, Barquisimeto, Coro, Punto Fijo, Puerto Cabello, Valencia, Maracay, Caracas, Los Teques, Puerto La Cruz, Cumaná, Ciudad Bolívar and Puerto Ordaz.
- Abelardo Pernía Passenger Terminal in El Vigía: it is the second terminal with the highest capacity and logistics in the state, it is located in Don Pepe Rójas Avenue in the city of El Vigía, it provides services to the main cities in the Center-West of the country such as Trujillo, Boconó, Valera, Barquisimeto, Coro, Punto Fijo, Puerto Cabello, Valencia, Maracay, Caracas and Los Teques, in the same way it maintains connection with the main entities of the neighboring states such as: Santa Bárbara del Zulia, San Carlos del Zulia, El Chivo and 4 Esquinas, Encontrados, Caja Seca, Cabimas, Ciudad Ojeda and Maracaibo in the state of Zulia, Coloncito, La Tendida, Seboruco, San Simón and San Cristóbal in the state of Táchira.
- Don Rafael Vivas de Tovar Passenger Terminal: it is 3.Terminal station of terrestrial transport of the state, is in the Avenue Cristóbal Mendoza of the City of Tovar, maintains exit towards the populations of Dancers, the Beach, Santa Cruz de Mora, Zea, Guaraque, Table Bolivar, as well as the cities of Merida and the Watchman, of equal way to San Cristóbal, Coloncito, the Shout, Cabimas, City Ojeda, Maracaibo, Barquisimeto, Chorus, Fixed Point, Valencia, Maracay and Caracas.

Terminal of Short Routes: this project of great importance was executed in the previous ones of the City of Ejido, with the purpose of decongesting the internal traffic of the capital, since its location to the south of the conurbation, guarantees the entrance of transport of passengers of a comfortable and simple form to be located in the entrance of the same one, after its inauguration it has served as a terminal of routes feeding the Massive Transport System Trolleybus of Mérida having a network of articulated buses mark yutong known as BUSMÉRIDA with routes towards the zones South of the Lake of Maracaibo, Valley of the Mocotíes, Towns of the South, the Towns of the North and towns of the Páramo.

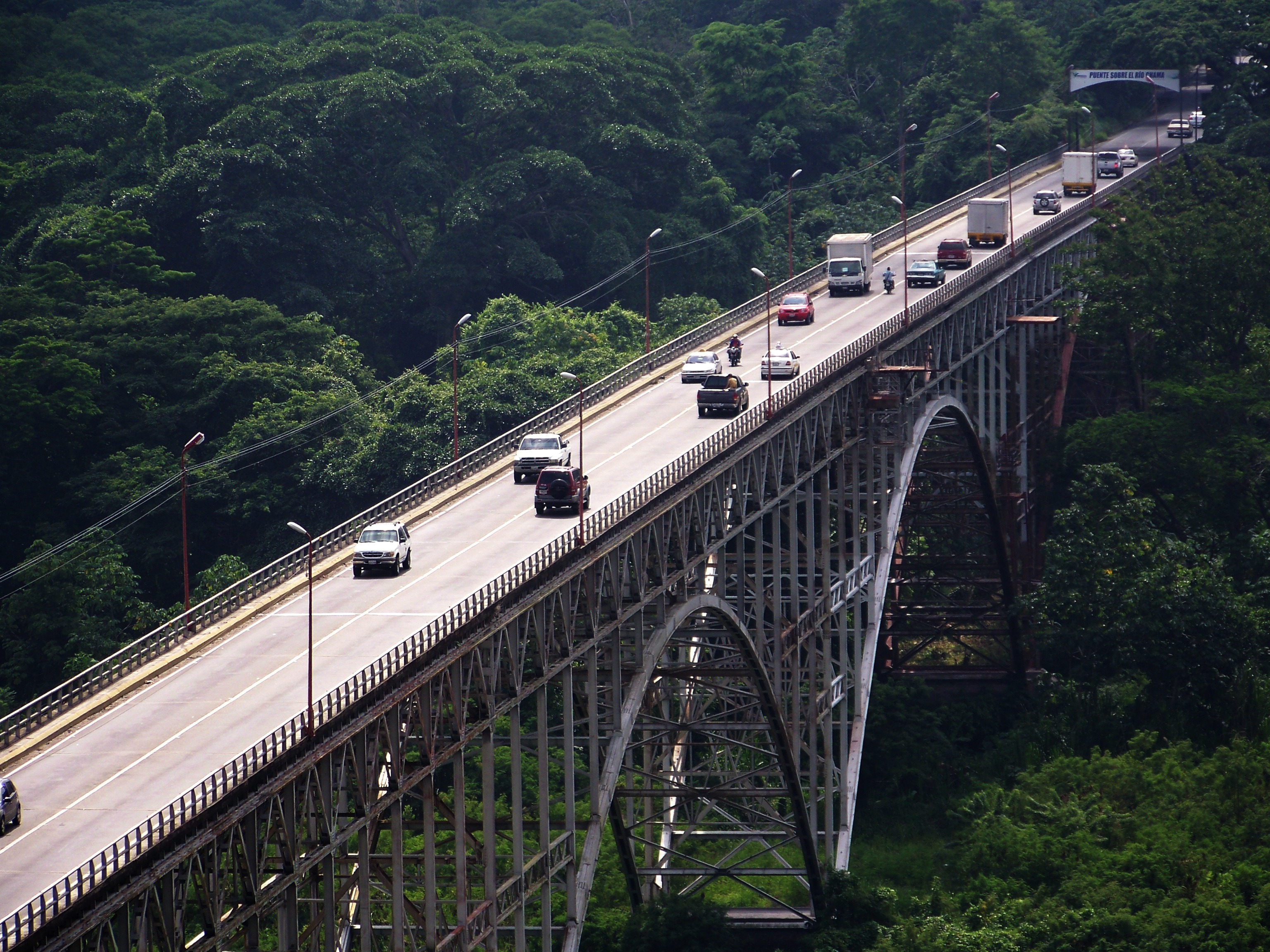
Chama River Bridge

=== Airports ===
- Alberto Carnevalli Airport (IATA: MRD, ICAO: SVMD) is a domestic airport located in the central area of the same, at an average altitude of 1,600 meters above sea level, currently provides commercial services through the national airline Conviasa which has 4 weekly connections with the Simon Bolivar International Airport in Maiquetía, this after its reopening on August 1, 2013, after 5 years of disuse. However, the Juan Pablo Perez Alfonso International Airport in the city of El Vigia serves the city of Merida as an alternative option for commercial operations, both cities are connected through the Rafael Caldera Highway at 60 km.
- The Juan Pablo Perez Alfonso International Airport is located in the city of El Vigia, Merida State in Venezuela. The airport was inaugurated on July 31, 1991, and currently has regular operations by Laser Airlines and Conviasa to Caracas, Perla Airlines to Porlamar, Serami Air to Maracaibo and Aerolínea Estelar Latinoamericana to Cartagena de Indias, being the only air terminal in commercial operation in the entity, as well as the South of Lake Maracaibo, is located 40 minutes from the city of Merida, 30 minutes from the city of Tovar and 40 minutes from the city of Santa Barbara del Zulia. One of the most outstanding characteristics of the airport is that the runway (more than 3,000 meters long) is the second longest in Venezuela after that of the International Airport of Maiquetía Simón Bolívar. It also has night lighting, which allows visual flight operations even after sunset, and a 30,750 m2 parking platform that is equipped with fuel supply services through direct piping to the aircraft.

== Culture ==
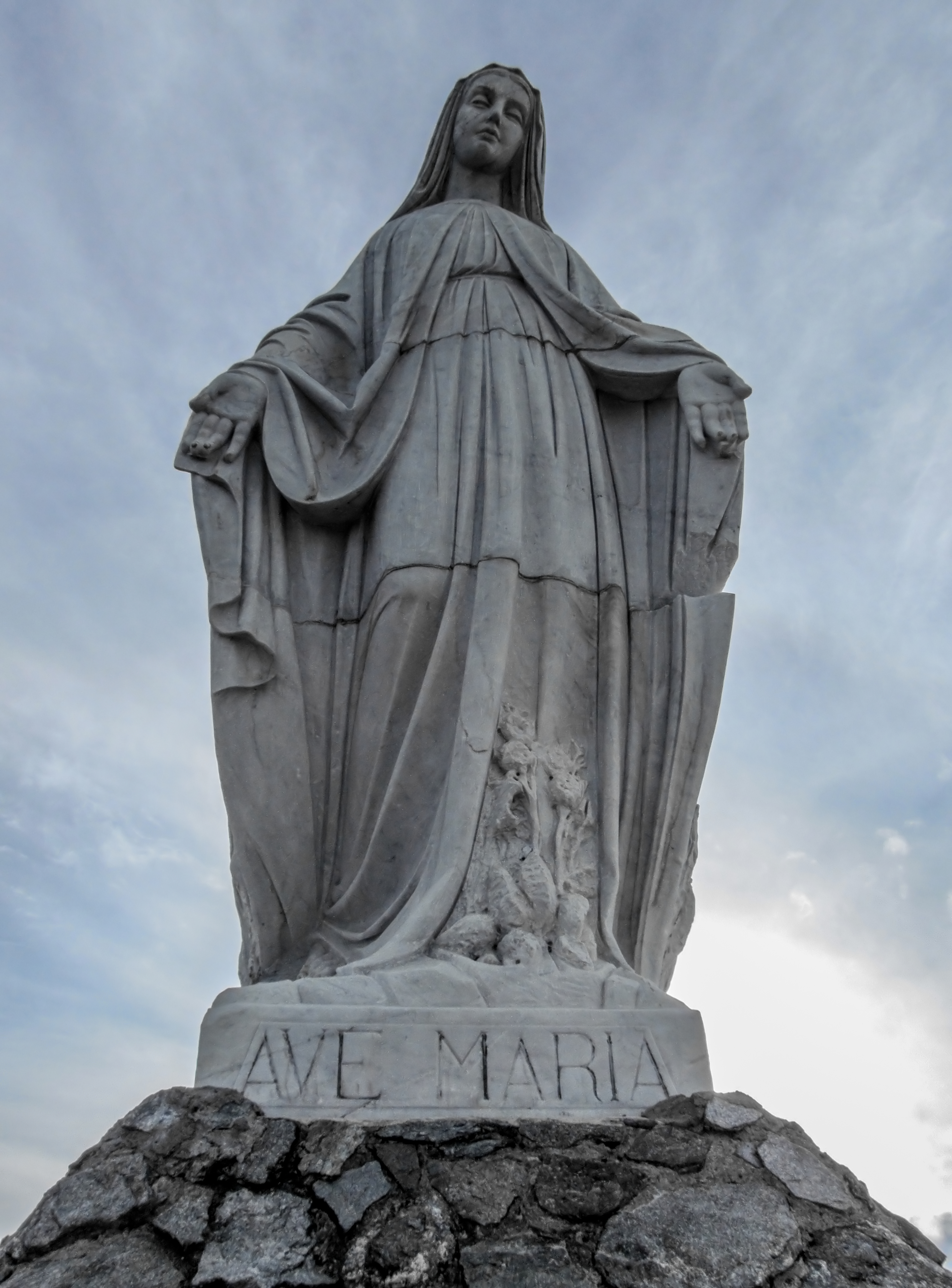
Monument to Our Lady of the Snows at Espejo Peak

=== Gastronomy ===
The typical dishes of the meridian food are:

- Acema andina (round bread made with corn flour)
- Pisca andina (coriander-based broth in which eggs, potatoes and milk are added)
- Cakes (filled with meat, chicken, cheese, etc..)
- Andean arepas (made with wheat flour)
- Trout (state-owned freshwater fish)
- Andean Hallaca

Among the most outstanding typical desserts are: the sweet polished (based on milk and covered with sugar), alfajores, guava sandwiches, milky candy and strawberries with cream, as well as drinks such as the Andean chicha, the calentaíto, mead, pineapple guarapo, blackberry wine and panela (paper).

It is worth mentioning that the southern gastronomy is internationally recognized, so many cooking contests and international fairs are held around the southern state.

=== Music ===
In the Páramo and the southern villages next to the Mocotíes area, the tradition and folklore of the mountains is expressed with native instruments; the so-called Peasant Music made up of genres such as waltz and string meringue are typical of the region. One more expression of the popular music of this land, originates in the Northern Towns or Pan-American Zone, whose afro-descendant roots give life to the Black music or percussion, a range of genres such as La Murga, the Chimbangle, the Drums, among others... each one inspired by legends, paraphrases or simply improvisation.

Llanera music such as the Pasaje and Joropo that tell popular stories and the long days of work are not absent in Merida since due to the characteristics of the Panamerican Zone the popular genre of Venezuela is also felt; but not only in this zone since in the fields of the Mocotíes the Llanero feeling resonates with strength.

The sounds of the aboriginal cultures move like the wind around the whole state, being its epicenter the towns of San Juan, Chiguará and Lagunillas where the ethnic roots of the Meridians still prevail as if time never passed.

Although the Latin American, Afro-descendant, Caribbean and Timotocuica traditions and roots have not been erased with time, the influence of the Anglo-Saxon music has also had a place in these lands, this is obvious, it was impossible to think that cities like El Vigia and Ejido with an important commercial impact and cities like Merida and Tovar with a transcendental bohemian culture were not influenced by the Rock, Pop, Hip Hop, Dancehall, R&B genres, among others.

=== Bullfighting ===
The Venezuelan Andes are lands of native roots and acquired as the Fiesta Brava, this type of party known as the most gallant and heroic of the existing ones felt by a sector of the world population but known as the most cruel and inhumane by another sector more dissident and humanist. Bullfighting is a cultural expression of the mother country Spain, has had a strong follow up in the cities of the heights as those belonging to the States Merida and Tachira. The Andean epicenter (Merida) is a state where bullfights are held almost by law accompanied by the festivities of each town, which is why it is called the main course of the celebrations, this has led to important national and international events which not only allow the recreation and entertainment of the people also allows a cultural exchange of own and others causing the representatives of the municipal and state executives invest a large amount of foreign exchange in both promotion and implementation of them.

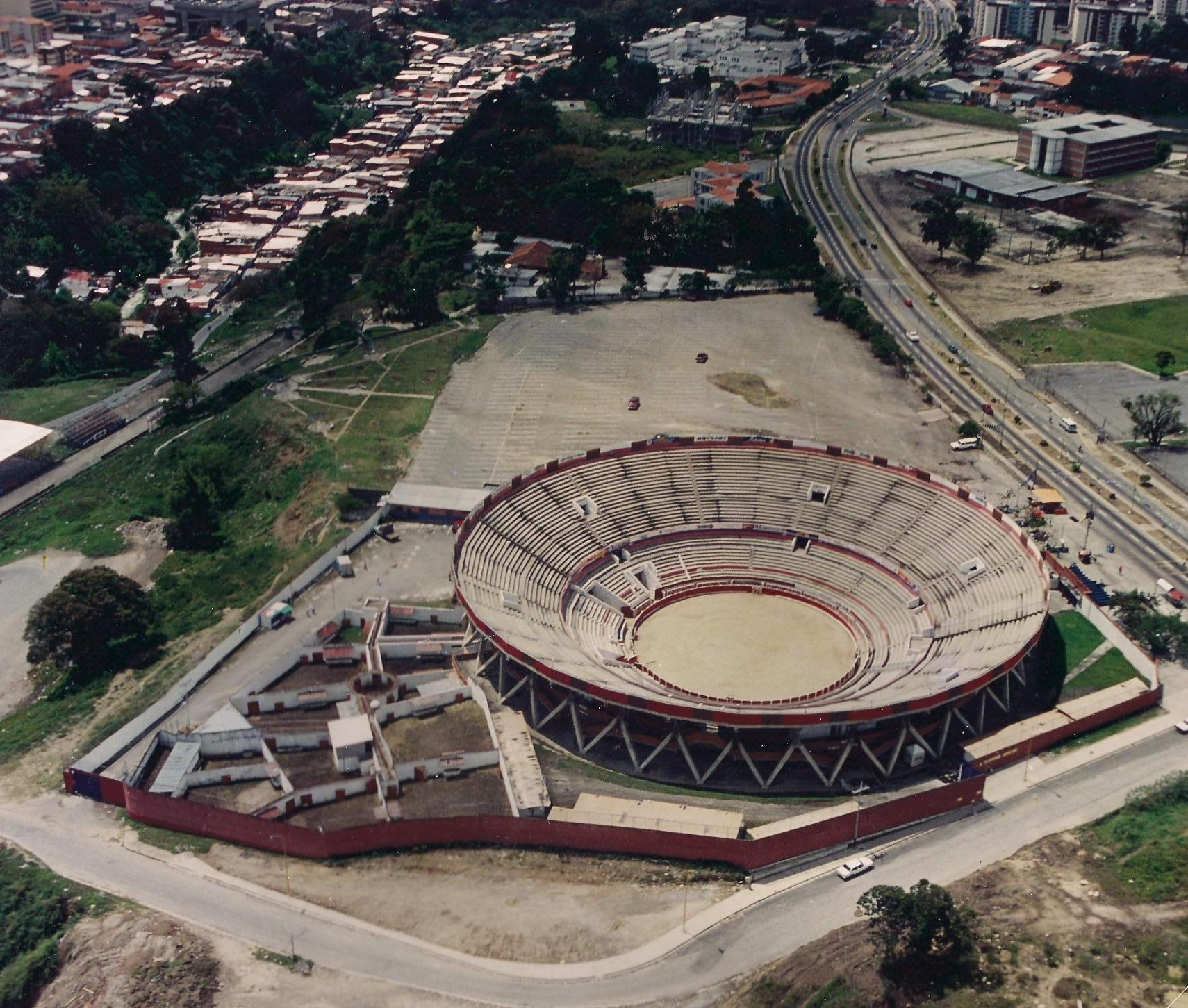
Plaza de Toros Román Eduardo Sandia, Mérida

The festival of the bull and the bullfighter has generated strong changes in the southern Indo-Caribbean since the festivities create in the citizens an emotion of anxiety and waiting for them to take place.

== Sports ==
Merida is a sports entity par excellence, home to different sports clubs and franchises, representing localities, commercial houses, public entities, educational institutions, municipalities and even the state in various competitions; The southern territory has been the scene of various sports such as chess, football, baseball, cycling, swimming, basketball, volleyball, trekking, athletics, mountaineering, paragliding, tennis, Basque pelota, judo, taekwondo, karate, fencing, table tennis, gymnastics, indoor football, beach volleyball, softball, bolas criollas, among other disciplines.

Throughout the region there is a diversity of sports scenarios of high competition and street sports which characterizes Merida as an important sports entity in the country, a fact that has been consolidated by the different national and international sports entities when they have put their faith in their localities to host different tournaments such as:

- Copa América Venezuela 2007
- 1977 South American U-20 Championship
- Copa Libertadores de América
- XXI Central American and Caribbean Games
- XVI National Games 2005
- IV Juvines ULA 85
- VII Juvines ULA 94
- XIV Juvines ULA 2007

=== Sports facilities ===
Merida has sports and Olympic facilities in all localities and municipalities, the main ones being

- The 5 Águilas Blancas Metropolitan Olympic Complex in the city of Merida, which includes the Metropolitan Olympic Stadium in Merida with a capacity for 42,200 people, the Alvaro Parra Davila Coleo Sleeve, an Olympic swimming pool, a tennis court complex, and several specialized gyms for the practice of Judo, Gymnastics, Karate, Fencing and Table Tennis.
- The Los Andes Sports Complex in the city of Merida, consisting of the 9 de Octubre Gymnasium, the Gimnasio de Fuerza, the Tae-kwon-do Gymnasium, the Municipal Libertador Baseball Stadium and the Guillermo Soto Rosa Olympic Stadium.
- The Carlos Maya Sports Complex in the city of El Vigía, located in the Buenos Aires urbanization, comprising the Ramón Hernández Stadium, the Acacio Sandia Ramírez Baseball Stadium, the América Bendito swimming pool complex, the Óscar Ortega Multiple Gymnasium and the José Luis Varela Boxing Gym.12
- The Campo de Oro Sports Complex of the Universidad de Los Andes, located in the city of Merida, has an Olympic swimming pool, a softball stadium, two minor baseball stadiums, a soccer and rugby practice facility, an open field for soccer and rugby training, and a complex of sand courts.
- The Italo D' Filippis Sports Complex in the city of Ejido, made up of a short pool and a complex of multiple courts.
- The Claudio Corredor Muller Recreational Complex in the City of Tovar, made up of the Ramón Chiarelli Municipal Olympic Stadium, the Teresita Izaguirre Olympic Pool and the Tovar Bullring, also called the Coliseo el Llano, with a capacity for 9,000 spectators.

=== Football ===
Mérida is the birthplace of the oldest Venezuelan soccer team, Estudiantes de Mérida F.C., in addition to other teams such as Union Atlético El Vigía Fútbol Club, ULA F.C., among others.

==== Teams ====
- Merida students: It is a Venezuelan team that plays in the First Division of professional football in Venezuela. It was founded on April 4, 1971, and its debut was on October 12, 1971, against Deportivo Portugués de Caracas, which it defeated two times by one.?
- ULA F.C.: The Universidad de Los Andes Fútbol Club commonly referred to as Universidad de Los Andes, ULA FC or ULA Mérida, is a team of the Venezuelan professional soccer league based in the city of Merida. Founded in 1977, it has participated in international tournaments such as the Copa Libertadores and has won national competitions in both the first and second divisions.
- Unión Atlético El Vigía Fútbol Club: Team that plays in the First Division of professional football in Venezuela, is a Venezuelan football team, establish in October 1987 with the name of El Vigía Fútbol Club, has its headquarters in the city of El Vigía-Estado Mérida.
- Tovar FC: this team was founded in 2014 and plays in the third division of professional football in Venezuela. It has its headquarters in the Ramon Chiarelli Diaz Municipal Olympic Stadium in the city of Tovar.

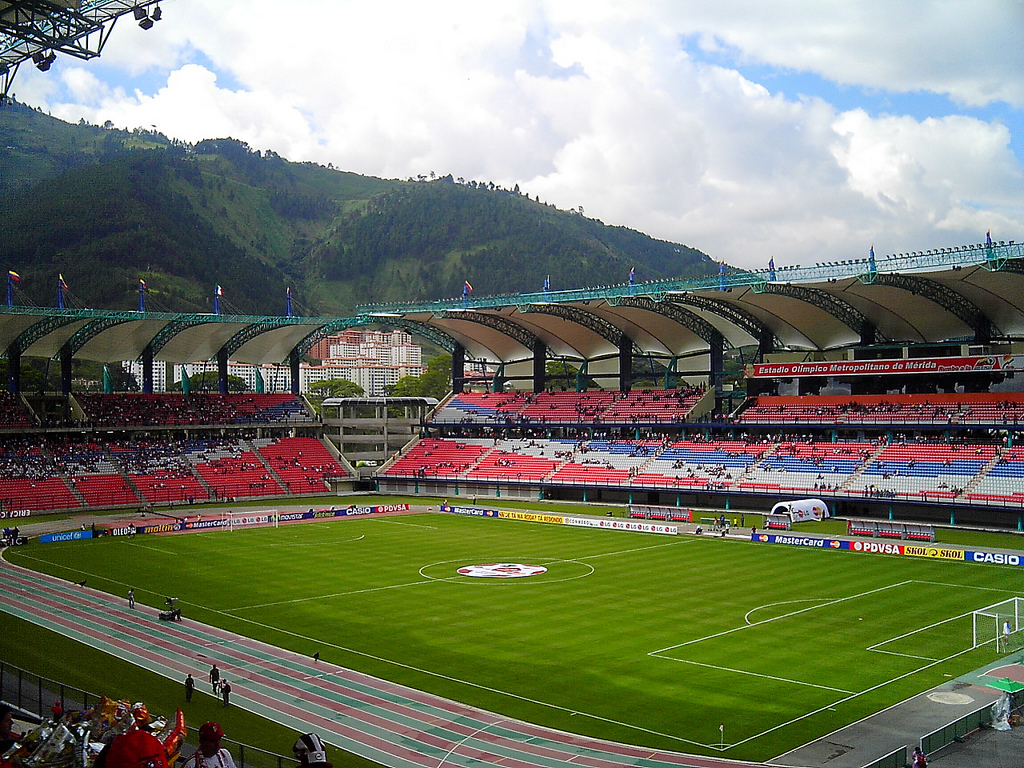
Metropolitan Stadium of Mérida

=== Baseball ===
Baseball represents one of the most practiced disciplines in the region, being its epicenter the city of Tovar, where the main headquarters of the delegation of Los Criollitos de Venezuela in the state of Merida, is also the birthplace of great baseball players like Johan Santana, widely considered to be one of the best baseball pitchers of all times in Venezuela, player of the Navegantes del Magallanes in the Venezuelan Professional Baseball League and of the New York Mets of the National Major League Baseball, as well as Oswaldo Sosa, Wiston Márquez and Julio Puentes, who have been recruited by the Scouts of national and international clubs.

On February 25, 2005, the Bolivarian National Baseball League was founded at the initiative of the then National Institute of Sports, a semi-professional baseball league in Venezuela, created to offer an alternative to baseball players who had little chance of playing outside Venezuela during the months when the Venezuelan Professional Baseball League was inactive and to consolidate baseball practice in other regions of Venezuela, In the case of the state of Merida, the league has the participation of the Condor de Merida BBC club, which plays in the Central-Western conference, being in the Llanera-Andina division and is based in the Libertador de Merida Stadium located in the city of Merida.

=== Cycling ===
The state of Merida is one of the entities that have more support to the practice of the cycling, counting with professional teams like Escaladores de Merida and Sumiglov that compete in the principal competitions of the national cycling, between his principal exponents are the vigienses Carlos Maya and Jose Alarcón and the santacrucense Leonardo Sierra and the Tovareño Jose Rujano, being this last one champion of the Vuelta a Colombia, the Vuelta a Venezuela, the Vuelta al Táchira and mountain champion of the Giro d'Italia.

=== Swimming ===
The aquatic discipline also has relevance in the state of Merida, this can be seen in the large number of facilities that allow the development and strengthening of the clubs that represent this Olympic branch, the main epicenters being the cities of Merida, El Vigia, Ejido and Tovar, there we find groups like the Centro de Entrenamiento de Deportes Acuáticos de Mérida CEDAM, Club Talento 5 Aguilas Blancas, Club América Bendito ULA, Club Actividades Acuáticas Rafael Vidal, Academia de Deportes Acuáticos de Mérida ADAME, Club de Natación Tovar CNT, among others.

=== Rugby ===
In the state there are rugby teams like the Caballeros de Merida Rugby Club, Merida Rugby Club, Alacranes Rugby Club and Pucara El Vigia Rugby Club; all of them participating in the Venezuelan Rugby Club Championship.

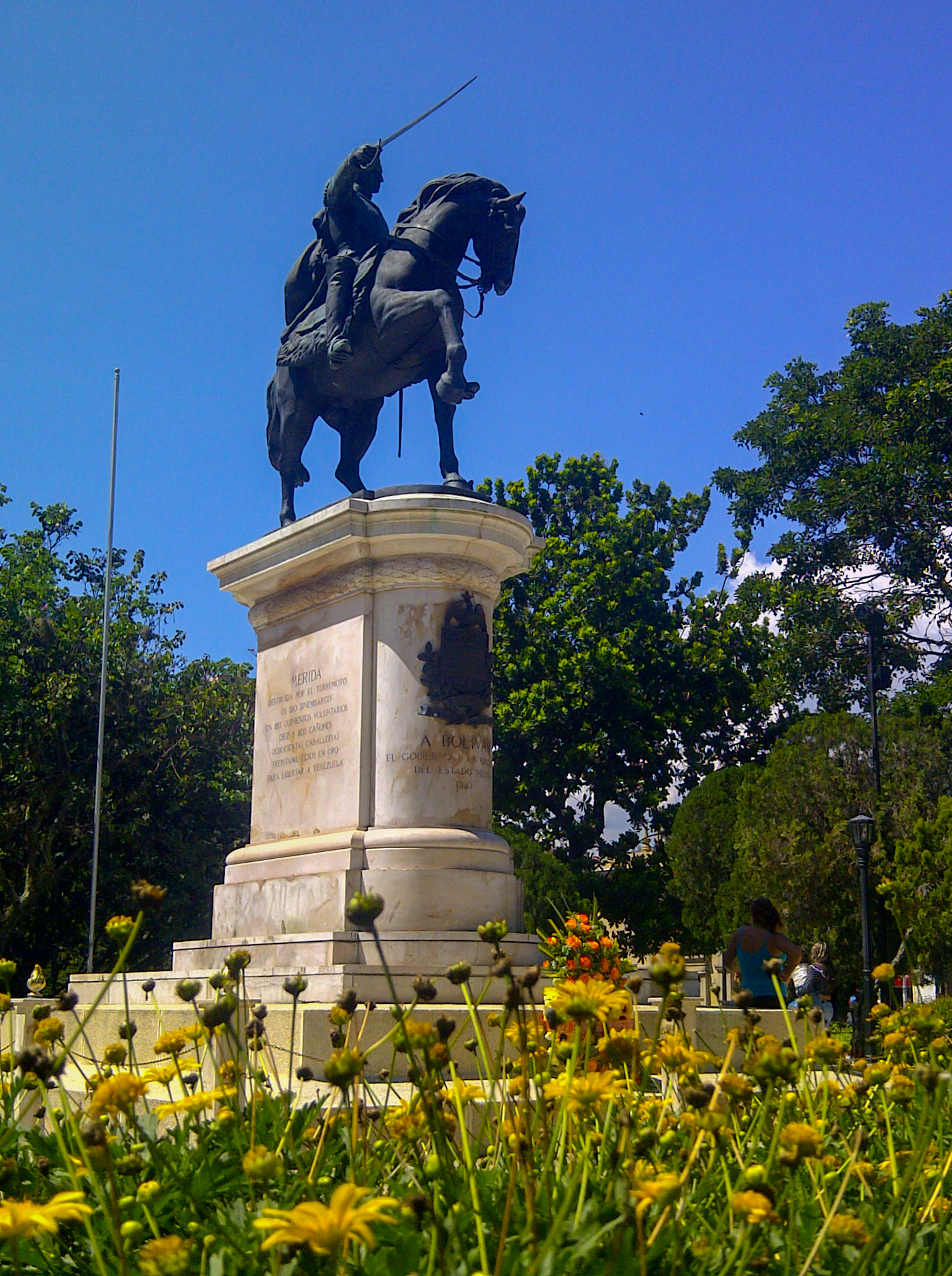
Bolívar Square, Mérida City

== See also ==
- States of Venezuela
- Nevado
- Merida glaciation
- Sierra Nevada de Merida
- Los Aleros theme park
- Albarregas Metropolitan Park
