= Municipalities of Venezuela =

Subdivisions of the States of Venezuela

Venezuela Municipalities

Municipalities (Spanish: municipios) are subdivisions of the states of Venezuela. There are 335 municipalities dividing the 23 states and the Capital District.

== Municipalities and their seats by federal entity ==
=== Capital District ===
1. Libertador Bolivarian Municipality (Caracas Libertador covers about half of the city of Caracas, officially a metropolitan area; the rest of the city is covered by four adjacent municipalities in Miranda state: Baruta, Chacao, el Hatillo and Sucre)

=== Amazonas ===
Municipalities of Amazonas

1. Alto Orinoco (La Esmeralda)
2. Atabapo (San Fernando de Atabapo)
3. Atures (Puerto Ayacucho)
4. Autana (Isla Ratón)
5. Manapiare (San Juan de Manapiare)
6. Maroa (Maroa)
7. Río Negro (San Carlos de Río Negro)

=== Anzoátegui ===
Municipalities of Anzoátegui

1. Anaco (Anaco)
2. Aragua (Aragua de Barcelona)
3. Diego Bautista Urbaneja (Lechería)
4. Fernando de Peñalver (Puerto Píritu)
5. Francisco del Carmen Carvajal (Valle de Guanape)
6. Francisco de Miranda (Pariaguán)
7. Guanta (Guanta)
8. Independencia (Soledad)
9. José Gregorio Monagas (Mapire)
10. Juan Antonio Sotillo (Puerto la Cruz)
11. Juan Manuel Cajigal (Onoto)
12. Libertad (San Mateo)
13. Manuel Ezequiel Bruzual (Clarines)
14. Pedro María Freites (Cantaura)
15. Píritu (Píritu)
16. San José de Guanipa (San José de Guanipa / El Tigrito)
17. San Juan de Capistrano (Boca de Uchire)
18. Santa Ana (Santa Ana)
19. Simón Bolívar (Barcelona)
20. Simón Rodríguez (El Tigre)
21. Sir Artur McGregor (El Chaparro)

=== Apure ===
Municipalities of Apure

1. Achaguas (Achaguas)
2. Biruaca (Biruaca)
3. Muñoz (Bruzual)
4. Páez (Guasdualito)
5. Pedro Camejo (San Juan de Payara)
6. Rómulo Gallegos (Elorza)
7. San Fernando (San Fernando de Apure)

=== Aragua ===
Municipalities of Aragua

1. Bolívar (San Mateo)
2. Camatagua (Camatagua)
3. Francisco Linares Alcántara (Santa Rita)
4. Girardot (Maracay)
5. José Angel Lamas (Santa Cruz)
6. José Félix Ribas (La Victoria)
7. José Rafael Revenga (El Consejo)
8. Libertador (Palo Negro)
9. Mario Briceño Iragorry (El Limón)
10. Ocumare de la Costa de Oro (Ocumare de la Costa)
11. San Casimiro (San Casimiro)
12. San Sebastián (San Sebastián)
13. Santiago Mariño (Turmero)
14. Santos Michelena (Las Tejerías)
15. Sucre (Cagua)
16. Tovar (Colonia Tovar)
17. Urdaneta (Barbacoas)
18. Zamora (Villa de Cura)

=== Barinas ===
Municipalities of Barinas

1. Alberto Arvelo Torrealba (Sabaneta)
2. Andrés Eloy Blanco (El Cantón)
3. Antonio José de Sucre (Socopó)
4. Arismendi (Arismendi)
5. Barinas (Barinas)
6. Bolívar (Barinitas)
7. Cruz Paredes (Barrancas)
8. Ezequiel Zamora (Santa Bárbara)
9. Obispos (Obispos)
10. Pedraza (Ciudad Bolivia)
11. Rojas (Libertad)
12. Sosa (Ciudad de Nutrias)

=== Bolívar ===
Municipalities of Bolívar

1. Caroní (Ciudad Guayana)
2. Cedeño (Caicara del Orinoco)
3. El Callao (El Callao)
4. Gran Sabana (Santa Elena de Uairén)
5. Heres (Ciudad Bolívar)
6. Padre Pedro Chien (El Palmar)
7. Piar (Upata)
8. Raúl Leoni (Ciudad Piar)
9. Roscio (Guasipati)
10. Sifontes (Tumeremo)
11. Sucre (Maripa)

=== Carabobo ===
Municipalities of Carabobo

1. Bejuma (Bejuma)
2. Carlos Arvelo (Güigüe)
3. Diego Ibarra (Mariara)
4. Guacara (Guacara)
5. Juan José Mora (Morón)
6. Libertador (Tocuyito)
7. Los Guayos (Los Guayos)
8. Miranda (Miranda)
9. Montalbán (Montalbán)
10. Naguanagua (Naguanagua)
11. Puerto Cabello (Puerto Cabello)
12. San Diego (San Diego)
13. San Joaquín (San Joaquín)
14. Valencia (Valencia)

=== Cojedes ===
Municipalities of Cojedes

1. Anzoátegui (Cojedes)
2. Falcón (Tinaquillo)
3. Girardot (El Baúl)
4. Lima Blanco (Macapo)
5. Pao de San Juan Bautista (El Pao)
6. Ricaurte (Libertad)
7. Rómulo Gallegos (Las Vegas)
8. San Carlos (San Carlos)
9. Tinaco (Tinaco)

=== Delta Amacuro ===
Municipalities of Delta Amacuro

1. Antonio Díaz (Curiapo)
2. Casacoima (Sierra Imataca)
3. Pedernales (Pedernales)
4. Tucupita (Tucupita)

=== Falcón ===
Municipalities of Falcón

1. Acosta (San Juan de los Cayos)
2. Bolívar (San Luis)
3. Buchivacoa (Capatárida)
4. Cacique Manaure (Yaracal)
5. Carirubana (Punto Fijo)
6. Colina (La Vela de Coro)
7. Dabajuro (Dabajuro)
8. Democracia (Pedregal)
9. Falcón Municipality, Falcón (Pueblo Nuevo)
10. Federación (Churuguara)
11. Jacura (Jacura)
12. Los Taques (Santa Cruz de Los Taques)
13. Mauroa (Mene de Mauroa)
14. Miranda (Santa Ana de Coro)
15. Monseñor Iturriza (Chichiriviche)
16. Palmasola (Palmasola)
17. Petit (Cabure)
18. Píritu (Píritu)
19. San Francisco Municipality, Falcón (Mirimire)
20. Silva (Tucacas)
21. Sucre (La Cruz de Taratara)
22. Tocopero (Tocopero)
23. Unión (Santa Cruz de Bucaral)
24. Urumaco (Urumaco)
25. Zamora (Puerto Cumarebo)

=== Guárico ===
Municipalities of Guárico

1. Camaguán (Camaguán)
2. Chaguaramas (Chaguaramas)
3. El Socorro (El Socorro)
4. Francisco de Miranda (Calabozo)
5. José Félix Ribas (Tucupido)
6. José Tadeo Monagas (Altagracia de Orituco)
7. Juan Germán Roscio (San Juan de los Morros)
8. Julián Mellado (El Sombrero)
9. Las Mercedes (Las Mercedes del Llano)
10. Leonardo Infante (Valle de la Pascua)
11. Ortiz (Ortiz)
12. Pedro Zaraza (Zaraza)
13. San Gerónimo de Guayabal (Guayabal)
14. San José de Guaribe (San José de Guaribe)
15. Santa María de Ipire (Santa María de Ipire)

=== Lara ===
Municipalities of Lara

1. Andrés Eloy Blanco (Sanare)
2. Crespo (Duaca)
3. Iribarren (Barquisimeto)
4. Jiménez (Quíbor)
5. Morán (El Tocuyo)
6. Palavecino (Cabudare)
7. Simón Planas (Sarare)
8. Torres (Carora)
9. Urdaneta (Siquisique)

=== Mérida ===
Municipalities of Mérida

1. Alberto Adriani (El Vigía)
2. Andrés Bello (La Azulita)
3. Antonio Pinto Salinas (Santa Cruz de Mora)
4. Aricagua (Aricagua)
5. Arzobispo Chacón (Canagua)
6. Campo Elías (Ejido)
7. Caracciolo Parra Olmedo (Tucaní)
8. Cardenal Quintero (Santo Domingo)
9. Guaraque (Guaraque)
10. Julio César Salas (Arapuey)
11. Justo Briceño (Torondoy)
12. Libertador (Mérida)
13. Miranda (Timotes)
14. Obispo Ramos de Lora (Santa Elena de Arenales)
15. Padre Noguera (Santa María de Caparo)
16. Pueblo Llano (Pueblo Llano)
17. Rangel (Mucuchíes)
18. Rivas Dávila (Bailadores)
19. Santos Marquina (Tabay)
20. Sucre (Lagunillas)
21. Tovar (Tovar)
22. Tulio Febres Cordero (Nueva Bolivia)
23. Zea (Zea)

=== Miranda ===
Municipalities of Miranda

1. Acevedo (Caucagua)
2. Andrés Bello (San José de Barlovento)
3. Baruta (Nuestra Señora del Rosario de Baruta), part of the metropolitan area of Caracas
4. Brión (Higuerote)
5. Buroz (Mamporal)
6. Carrizal (Carrizal)
7. Chacao (Chacao), part of the metropolitan area of Caracas
8. Cristóbal Rojas (Charallave)
9. El Hatillo (El Hatillo), part of the metropolitan area of Caracas
10. Guaicaipuro (Los Teques)
11. Independencia (Santa Teresa del Tuy)
12. Lander (Ocumare del Tuy)
13. Los Salias (San Antonio de los Altos)
14. Páez (Río Chico)
15. Paz Castillo (Santa Lucía)
16. Pedro Gual (Cúpira)
17. Plaza (Guarenas)
18. Simón Bolívar (San Francisco de Yare)
19. Sucre (Petare), part of the metropolitan area of Caracas
20. Urdaneta (Cúa)
21. Zamora (Guatire)

=== Monagas ===
Municipalities of Monagas

1. Acosta (San Antonio de Capayacuar)
2. Aguasay (Aguasay)
3. Bolívar (Caripito)
4. Caripe (Caripe)
5. Cedeño (Caicara de Maturín)
6. Ezequiel Zamora (Punta de Mata)
7. Libertador (Temblador)
8. Maturín (Maturín)
9. Piar (Aragua de Maturín)
10. Punceres (Quiriquire)
11. Santa Bárbara (Santa Bárbara)
12. Sotillo (Barrancas del Orinoco)
13. Uracoa (Uracoa)

=== Nueva Esparta ===
Municipalities of Nueva Esparta

1. Antolín del Campo (Plaza Paraguachi)
2. Arismendi (La Asunción)
3. Díaz (San Juan Bautista)
4. García (El Valle del Espíritu Santo)
5. Gómez (Santa Ana)
6. Maneiro (Pampatar)
7. Marcano (Juan Griego)
8. Mariño (Porlamar)
9. Macanao Peninsula (Boca del Río)
10. Tubores (Punta de Piedras)
11. Villalba (San Pedro de Coche)

=== Portuguesa ===
Municipalities of Portuguesa

1. Agua Blanca (Agua Blanca)
2. Araure (Araure)
3. Esteller (Píritu)
4. Guanare (Guanare)
5. Guanarito (Guanarito)
6. Monseñor José Vicente de Unda (Paraíso de Chabasquén)
7. Ospino (Ospino)
8. Páez (Acarigua)
9. Papelón (Papelón)
10. San Genaro de Boconoito (Boconoito)
11. San Rafael de Onoto (San Rafael de Onoto)
12. Santa Rosalía (El Playón)
13. Sucre (Biscucuy)
14. Turén (Villa Bruzual)

=== Sucre ===
Municipalities of Sucre

1. Andrés Eloy Blanco (Casanay)
2. Andrés Mata (San José de Aerocuar)
3. Arismendi (Río Caribe)
4. Benítez (El Pilar)
5. Bermúdez (Carúpano)
6. Bolívar (Marigüitar)
7. Cajigal (Yaguaraparo)
8. Cruz Salmerón Acosta (Araya)
9. Libertador (Tunapuy)
10. Mariño (Irapa)
11. Mejía (San Antonio del Golfo)
12. Montes (Cumanacoa)
13. Ribero (Cariaco)
14. Sucre (Cumaná)
15. Valdez (Güiria)

=== Táchira ===
Municipalities of Táchira

1. Andrés Bello (Cordero)
2. Antonio Rómulo Costa (Las Mesas)
3. Ayacucho (Colón)
4. Bolívar (San Antonio del Táchira)
5. Cárdenas (Táriba)
6. Córdoba (Santa Ana del Táchira)
7. Fernández Feo (San Rafael del Piñal)
8. Francisco de Miranda (San José de Bolívar)
9. García de Hevia (La Fría)
10. Guásimos (Palmira)
11. Independencia (Capacho Nuevo)
12. Jáuregui (La Grita)
13. José María Vargas (El Cobre)
14. Junín (Rubio)
15. Libertad (Capacho Viejo)
16. Libertador (Abejales)
17. Lobatera (Lobatera)
18. Michelena (Michelena)
19. Panamericano (Coloncito)
20. Pedro María Ureña (Ureña)
21. Rafael Urdaneta (Delicias)
22. Samuel Dario Maldonado (La Tendida)
23. San Cristóbal (San Cristóbal)
24. San Judas Tadeo (Umuquena)
25. Seboruco (Seboruco)
26. Simón Rodríguez (San Simón)
27. Sucre (Queniquea)
28. Torbes (San Josecito)
29. Uribante (Pregonero)

=== Trujillo ===
Municipalities of Trujillo

1. Andrés Bello (Santa Isabel)
2. Boconó (Boconó)
3. Bolívar (Sabana Grande)
4. Candelaria (Chejendé)
5. Carache (Carache)
6. Escuque (Escuque)
7. José Felipe Márquez Cañizales (El Paradero)
8. José Vicente Campo Elías (Campo Elías)
9. La Ceiba (Santa Apolonia)
10. Miranda (El Dividive)
11. Monte Carmelo (Monte Carmelo)
12. Motatán (Motatán)
13. Pampán (Pampán)
14. Pampanito (Pampanito)
15. Rafael Rangel (Betijoque)
16. San Rafael de Carvajal (Carvajal)
17. Sucre (Sabana de Mendoza)
18. Trujillo (Trujillo)
19. Urdaneta (La Quebrada)
20. Valera (Valera)

=== Vargas ===

1. Vargas (La Guaira)

=== Yaracuy ===
Municipalities of Yaracuy

1. Aristides Bastidas (San Pablo)
2. Bolívar (Aroa)
3. Bruzual (Chivacoa)
4. Cocorote (Cocorote)
5. Independencia (Independencia)
6. José Antonio Páez (Sabana de Parra)
7. La Trinidad (Boraure)
8. Manuel Monge (Yumare)
9. Nirgua (Nirgua)
10. Peña (Yaritagua)
11. San Felipe (San Felipe)
12. Sucre (Guama)
13. Urachiche (Urachiche)
14. Veroes (Farriar).

=== Zulia ===
Municipalities of Zulia

1. Almirante Padilla (El Toro)
2. Baralt (San Timoteo, Venezuela)
3. Cabimas (Cabimas)
4. Catatumbo (Encontrados)
5. Colón (San Carlos del Zulia)
6. Francisco Javier Pulgar (Pueblo Nuevo / El Chivo)
7. Jesús Enrique Lossada (La Concepción)
8. Jesús María Semprún (Casigua el Cubo)
9. La Cañada de Urdaneta (Concepción)
10. Lagunillas (Ciudad Ojeda)
11. Machiques de Perijá (Machiques)
12. Mara (San Rafael del Moján)
13. Maracaibo (Maracaibo)
14. Miranda (Los Puertos de Altagracia)
15. Páez (Sinamaica)
16. Rosario de Perijá (La Villa del Rosario)
17. San Francisco (San Francisco)
18. Santa Rita (Santa Rita)
19. Simón Bolívar (Tía Juana)
20. Sucre (Bobures)
21. Valmore Rodríguez (Bachaquero)
