= Toas island =

Island in Venezuela

Toas
- Interactive map of Toas

Geography
- Location: Maracaibo Lake, Caribbean Sea
- Coordinates: 10°57′30″N 71°38′50″W
- Area: 3 km^{2} (1.2 sq mi)

Administration
- Venezuela
- State: Zulia

Toas Island (in Spanish "Isla de Toas") is a small limestone island in Venezuela. It is in the north-west of the country, north of Maracaibo Lake, just southwest of Zapara island and to the south of San Carlos peninsula, forming part of the "Barra del Lago de Maracaibo". Administratively it falls under the jurisdiction of Almirante Padilla Municipality in the state of Zulia.

== Geography and geology ==
Toas island is located 2.5 kilometres (1.6 miles) to the south of San Carlos peninsula (western section of Maracaibo Lake sand-bar), and 5 kilometres (3.1 miles) east of San Rafael del Moján, a small town on the west coast of the lake.

Toas island has a surface area of 3 square kilometres (1 square mile). There are the saline ponds called "El Toro" and "Aracho", a mine of sulphurous lignite, and several limestone caves which have been exploited since Spanish colonial times. Also exploited by the Spanish are clay caves in the southern area, and a small copper mine. The abundance of limestone has helped the development of a small cement industry.

== Inhabitants ==
El Toro (Zulia), a fishing village, is located on the island, which is also the capital of the Almirante Padilla Municipality. It has a dock in the northern side, available to ships of middle size. The small town has also a church and various shops located in a typical Spanish square, the Plaza Bolivar.

== See also ==
- Alonso de Ojeda
- Maracaibo
