= Justo Briceño Municipality =

Justo Briceño Municipality Municipio Justo Briceño
- Municipality
- Flag Coat of arms

- Location in Mérida

- Location in Venezuela
- Coordinates: 9°02′17″N 70°58′24″W
- Country: Venezuela
- State: Mérida
- Municipal seat: Torondoy[*]

Government
  - Mayor: Víctor Matheus López

Area
  - Total: 509 km^{2} (197 sq mi)

Population (2007)
  - Total: 6,472
  - Density: 12.7/km^{2} (32.9/sq mi)
- Time zone: UTC−4 (VET)
- Area code(s): 0271
- Website: Official website

The Justo Briceño Municipality is one of the 23 municipalities (municipios) that makes up the Venezuelan state of Mérida and, according to a 2007 population estimate by the National Institute of Statistics of Venezuela, the municipality has a population of 6,472. The town of Torondoy is the shire town of the Justo Briceño Municipality.

== History ==
On September 23, 1867, it was established as Torondoy Civil Parish . In 1904, Torondoy District was established, comprising the parishes of Piñango, Santa Apolonia and Torondoy. On January 19, 1935, Torondoy District was renamed to Gómez District, but this change was short-lived, and in 1936, it was renamed Justo Briceño District. In 1988, it separated from the Tulio Febres Cordero Municipality and adopted the name of Justo Briceño Autonomous Municipality, and in 1992, dropped the title of Autonomous to become Justo Briceño Municipality.

A historical border conflict has existed over the border between the Zulia State and Mérida State parts of town.

== Geography ==
It is a completely mountainous region. Most of the territory lies between 1,150m and 2,000m of altitude, with altitudes exceeding 4,500m near the borders with Rangel and Libertador municipalities, resulting in snowy areas. The average annual temperature is 16 °C (60.8 °F) with average rainfall of 1,250mm. The main waterways include Torondoy, Macumana, Macumpate and Arenoso rivers and El Molino creek.

== Demographics ==
The Justo Briceño Municipality, according to a 2007 population estimate by the National Institute of Statistics of Venezuela, has a population of 6,472 (up from 5,355 in 2000). This amounts to 0.8% of the state's population. The municipality's population density is 12.7 inhabitants per square kilometre (33/sq mi).

== Government ==
The mayor of the Justo Briceño Municipality is Víctor Luis Matheus López, re-elected on October 31, 2004, with 51% of the vote. The municipality is divided into two parishes; Capital Justo Briceño and San Cristóbal de Torondoy.

== See also ==
- Torondoy
- Mérida
- Municipalities of Venezuela
