= Pedro Gual =

Pedro Gual may refer to:

- Pedro Gual Municipality, a municipality in the state of Miranda, Venezuela
- Pedro Gual Escandón, president of Venezuela
- Pedro Gual Villalbí, Spanish politician
