= La Quebrada =

La Quebrada can refer to:

- La Quebrada, Venezuela, also known as La Quebrada de San Roque, capital of Urdaneta Municipality, Trujillo.
- La Quebrada, Mexico, famous diving spot in Acapulco.
- La Quebrada, a springboard moonsault attack used in professional wrestling invented by Yoshihiro Asai, better known by his gimmick name Último Dragón.
- La Quebrada (Mexibús), a BRT station in Cuautitlán Izcalli, Mexico
