= Urdaneta Municipality =

Urdaneta Municipality may refer to any of the following places in Venezuela:

- Urdaneta Municipality, Aragua, in the state of Aragua
- Urdaneta Municipality, Lara, in the state of Lara
- Urdaneta Municipality, Miranda, in the state of Miranda
- Urdaneta Municipality, Trujillo, in the state of Trujillo
