= Urdaneta Municipality, Aragua =

Urdaneta Municipality Municipio Urdaneta
- Municipality
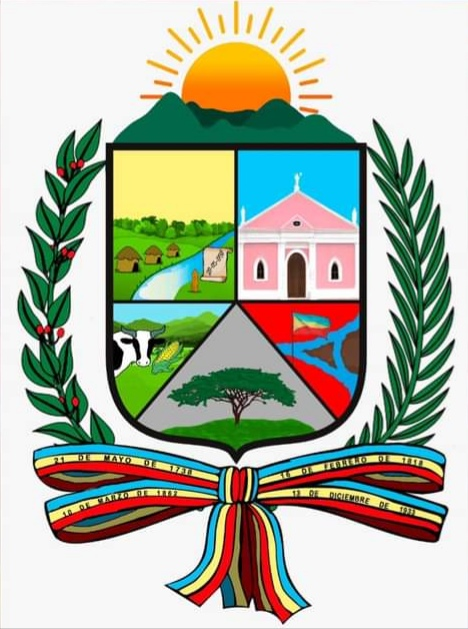
- Flag Coat of arms

- Location in Aragua

- Location in Venezuela
- Coordinates: 9°32′13″N 66°43′37″W
- Country: Venezuela
- State: Aragua

Government
  - Mayor: Julio Melo González PSUV

Area
  - Total: 2,035.3 km^{2} (785.8 sq mi)

Population (2011)
  - Total: 21,271
  - Density: 10.451/km^{2} (27.068/sq mi)
- Time zone: UTC−4 (VET)
- Area code(s): 0246
- Website: Official website

Urdaneta is one of the 18 municipalities (municipios) that makes up the Venezuelan state of Aragua and, according to the 2011 census by the National Institute of Statistics of Venezuela, the municipality has a population of 21,271. The town of Barbacoas is the shire town of the Urdaneta Municipality.

== Name ==
The municipality is one of several in Venezuela named "Urdaneta Municipality" in honour of Venezuelan independence hero Rafael Urdaneta.

== Demographics ==
The Urdaneta Municipality, according to a 2011 population estimate by the National Institute of Statistics of Venezuela, has a population of 21,271 (up from 18,734 in 2001). The municipality's population density is 10.51 inhabitants per square kilometre (27.2/sq mi).

== Government ==
The mayor of the Urdaneta Municipality is Sotero González, re-elected in 2021, with 49.41% of the vote, after the previous mayor Antonio Lugo deceased. The municipality is divided into four parishes; Capital Urdaneta, Las Peñitas, San Francisco de Cara, and Taguay.
