= Obispo Ramos de Lora Municipality =

Obispo Ramos de Lora Municipality Municipio Obispo Ramos de Lora
- Municipality
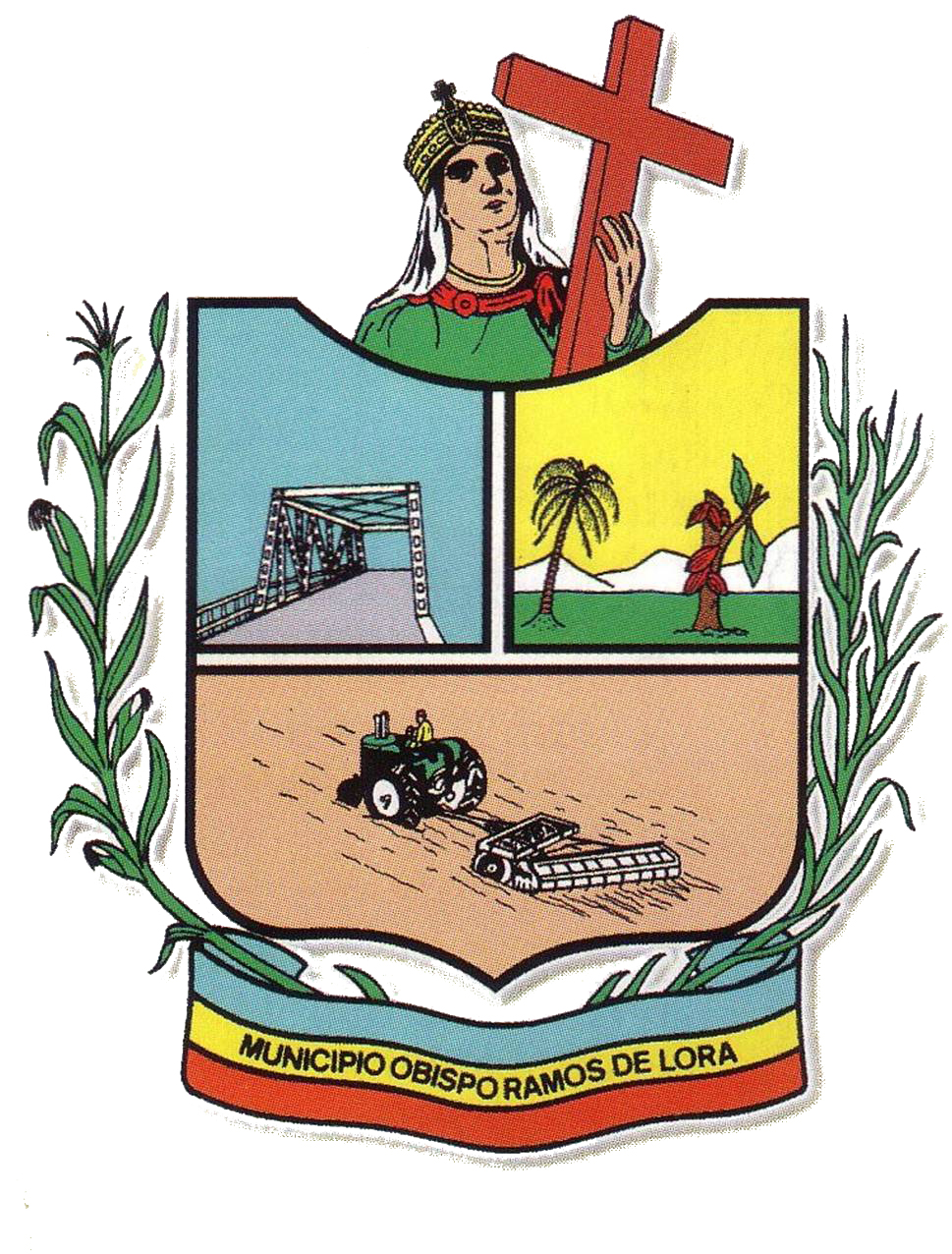
- Flag Coat of arms

- Location in Mérida

- Location in Venezuela
- Coordinates: 8°50′23″N 71°26′31″W
- Country: Venezuela
- State: Mérida

Government
  - Mayor: Yanetzi Urbina (PSUV)

Area
  - Total: 321 km^{2} (124 sq mi)

Population (2007)
  - Total: 25,002
  - Density: 77.9/km^{2} (202/sq mi)
- Time zone: UTC−4 (VET)
- Area code(s): 0274
- Website: Official website

The Obispo Ramos de Lora Municipality is one of the 23 municipalities (municipios) that makes up the Venezuelan state of Mérida and, according to a 2007 population estimate by the National Institute of Statistics of Venezuela, the municipality has a population of 25,002. The town of Santa Elena de Arenales is the shire town of the Obispo Ramos de Lora Municipality.

== Demographics ==
The Obispo Ramos de Lora Municipality, according to a 2007 population estimate by the National Institute of Statistics of Venezuela, has a population of 25,002 (up from 21,496 in 2000). This amounts to 2.96% of the state's population. The municipality's population density is 77.9 inhabitants per square kilometre (202/sq mi).

== Government ==
The mayor of the Obispo Ramos de Lora Municipality is Humberto Gómez, re-elected on October 31, 2004 with 49% of the vote. The municipality is divided into three parishes; Capital Obispo Ramos de Lora, Eloy Paredes, and San Rafael de Alcázar.

== See also ==
- Santa Elena de Arenales
- Mérida
- Municipalities of Venezuela
