= Ezequiel Zamora Municipality, Monagas =

Ezequiel Zamora Municipality Municipio Ezequiel Zamora
- Municipality
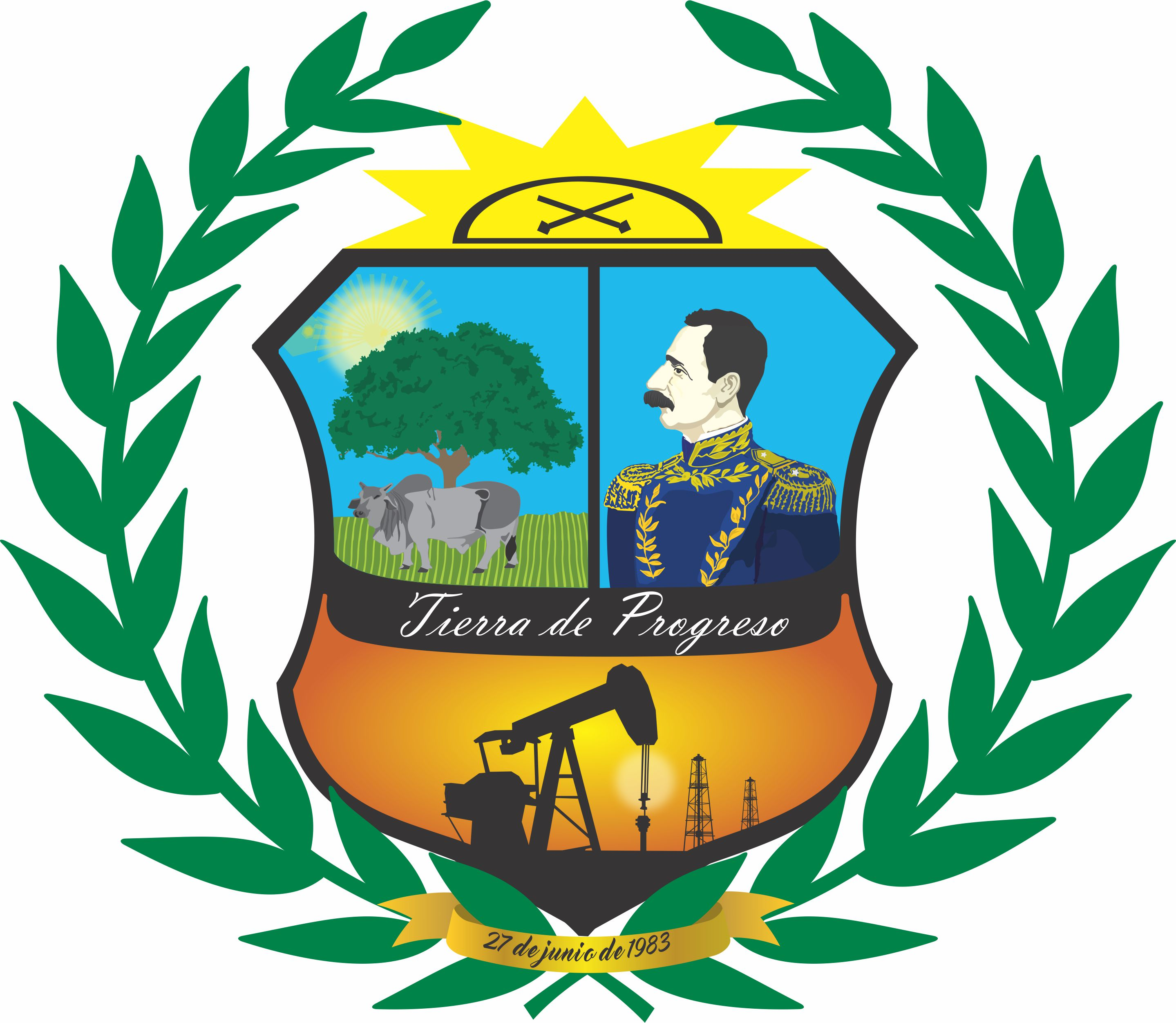
- Coat of arms

- Location in Monagas

- Location in Venezuela
- Coordinates: 9°38′24″N 63°40′54″W
- Country: Venezuela
- State: Monagas
- Municipal seat: Punta de Mata

Government
  - Mayor: Oscar Cedeño (PSUV)

Area
  - Total: 433.8 km^{2} (167.5 sq mi)

Population (2014)
  - Total: 297,170
  - Density: 685.0/km^{2} (1,774/sq mi)
- Time zone: UTC−4 (VET)

Ezequiel Zamora is one of the 13 municipalities of the state of Monagas, Venezuela. The municipality's capital is Punta de Mata.

== History ==
On 2021, Oscar Cedeño was elected Major.

== Geography ==
The Ezequiel Zamora municipality is northwest of Monagas State.

== Economy ==
The oil activity, in the areas of El Tejero and Muri.

== Education ==
The municipality has various schools and high schools, offering primary, secondary and diversified education.

== Sports ==
It also has sports fields and stadiums, as the Municipal Stadium "Los Evangélicos", located in Brisas del Aeropuerto de Punta de Mata.

== Politics and government ==
=== Mayors ===
- Ángel Guzmán (2008-2013)
- Raúl Brazon (2013-2017)
- Oscar Cedeño (2021-2025)
