= Buroz Municipality =

Buroz Municipality Municipio Buroz
- Municipality
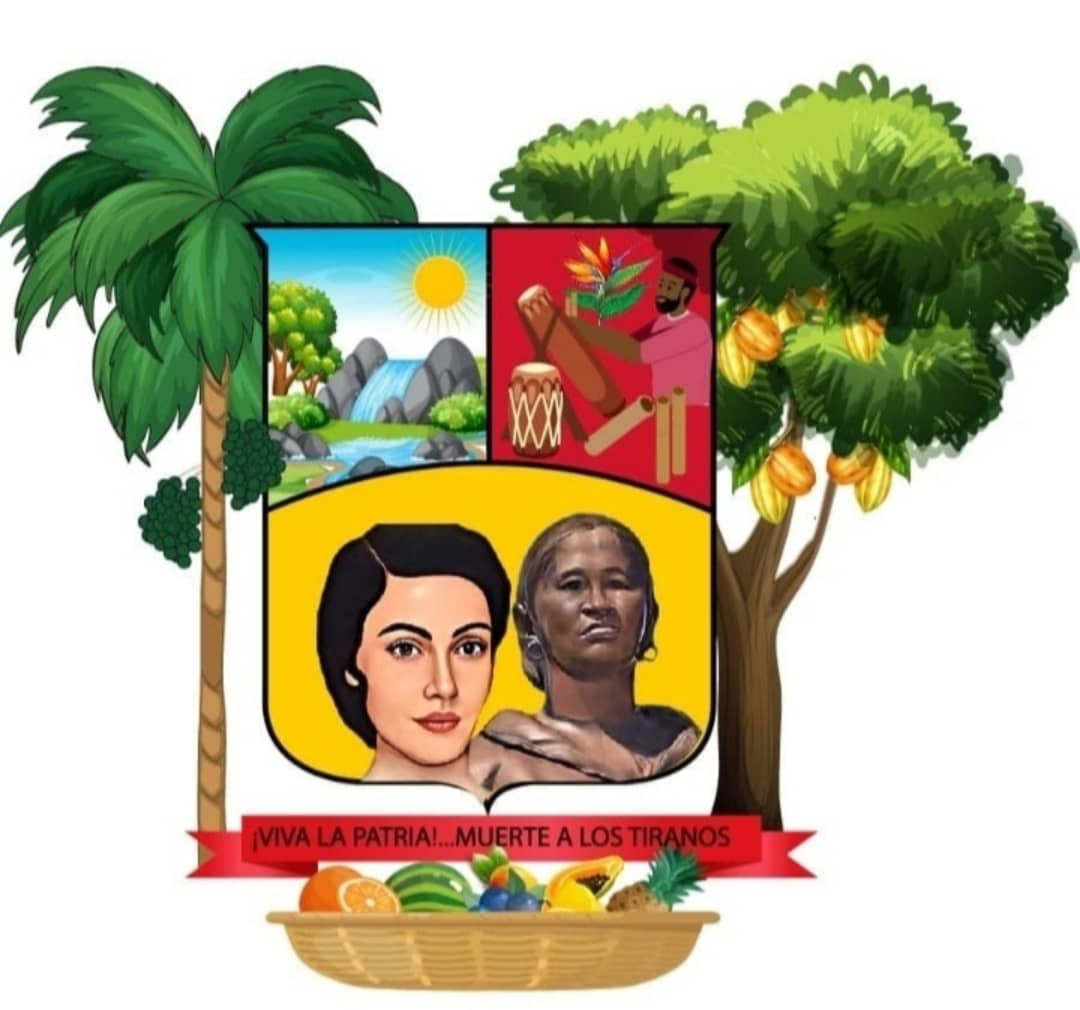
- Coat of arms

- Location in Miranda

- Location in Venezuela
- Coordinates: 10°19′56″N 66°07′23″W
- Country: Venezuela
- State: Miranda
- Municipal seat: Mamporal

Government
  - Mayor: Johan Castro Palacios (PSUV)

Area
  - Total: 257.8 km^{2} (99.5 sq mi)

Population (2007)
  - Total: 27,515
  - Density: 106.7/km^{2} (276.4/sq mi)
- Time zone: UTC−4 (VET)
- Area code(s): 0234
- Website: Official website

Buroz is one of the 21 municipalities (municipios) that makes up the Venezuelan state of Miranda and, according to a 2011 population estimate by the National Institute of Statistics of Venezuela, the municipality has a population of 27,515. The town of Mamporal is the municipal seat of the Buroz Municipality.

== Demographics ==
Venezuela has not collected or reported complete population statistics since 2011. In 2019, President Maduro directed the National Institute of Statistics of Venezuela to conduct the census. However, only about 16% of the population was counted.

== Government ==
The mayor of the Buroz Municipality in 2004 was Ramón Gómez Serrano, re-elected on October 31 with 68% of the vote. The municipality is divided into one parish (Mamporal).
