= Santa Bárbara Municipality, Monagas =

Santa Bárbara Municipality Municipio Santa Bárbara
- Municipality
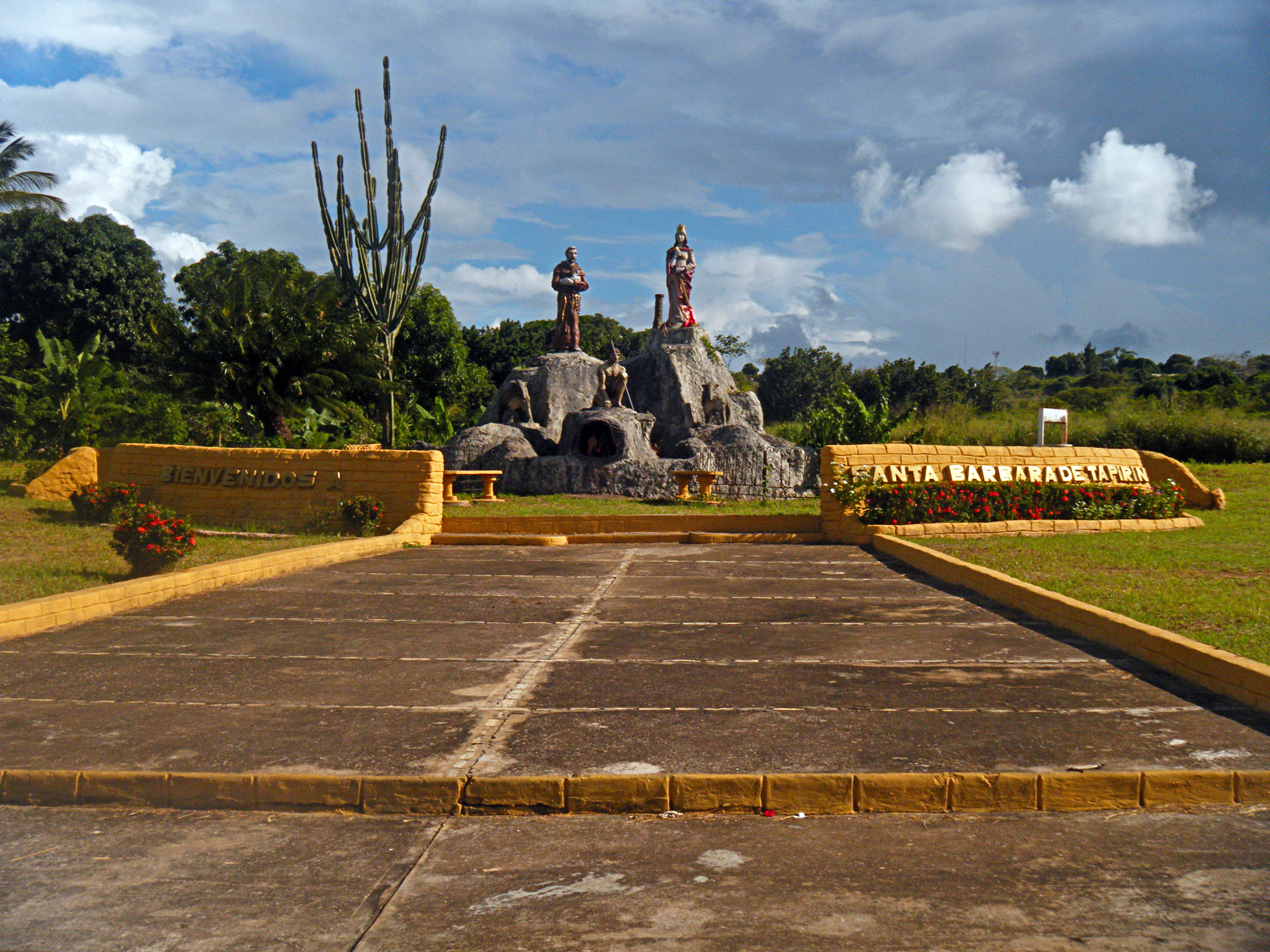
- Santa Barbara monument

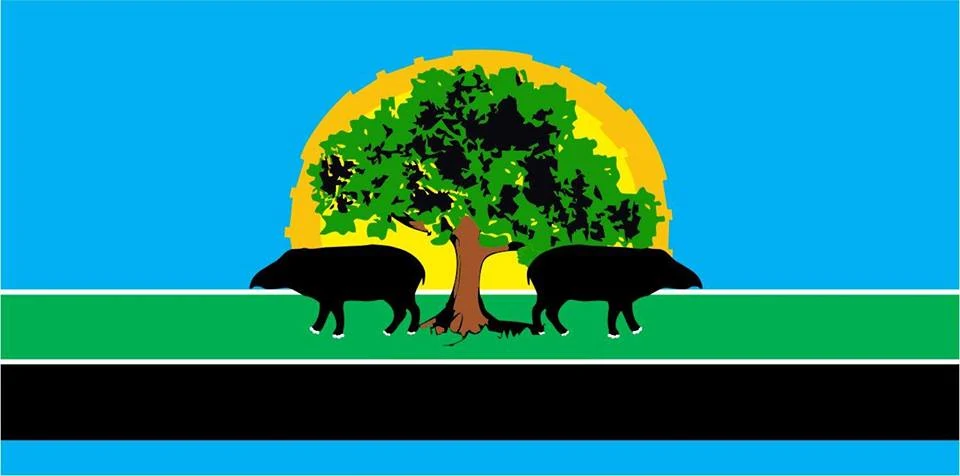
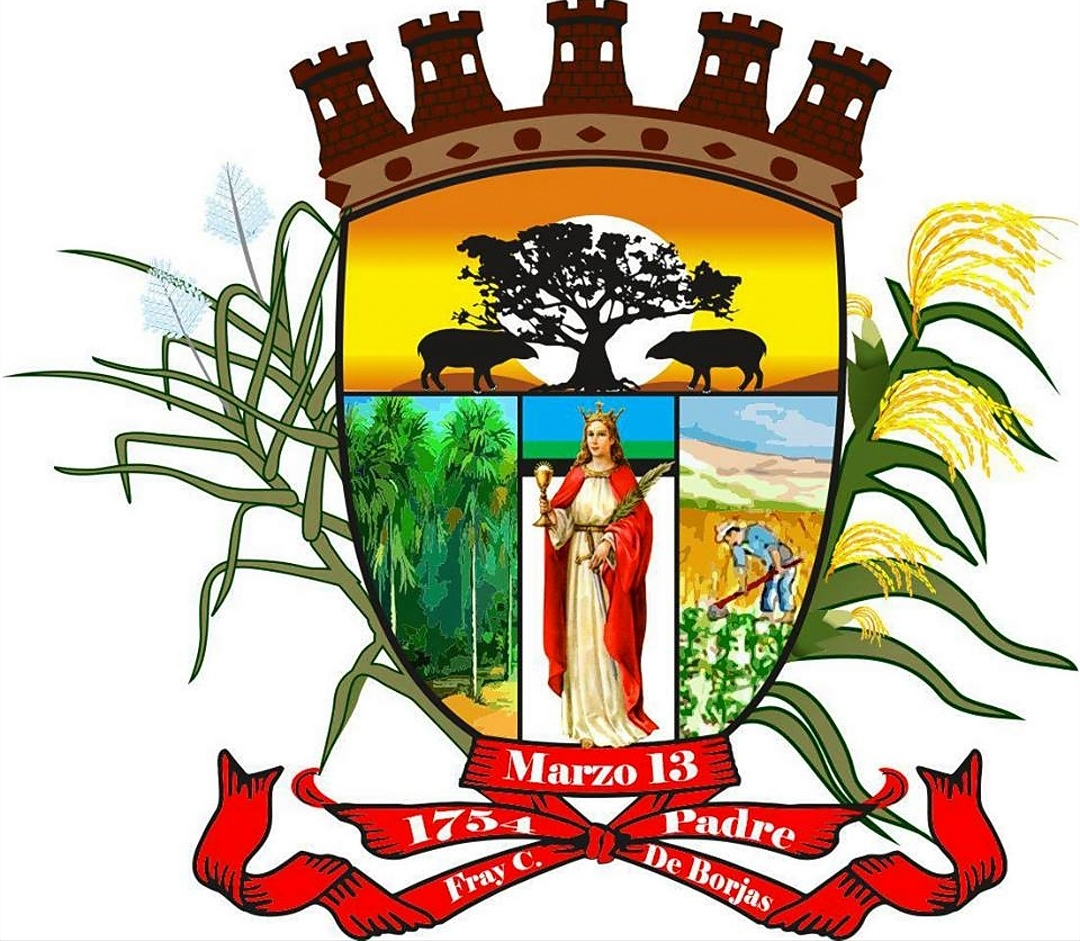
- Flag Coat of arms

- Location in Monagas

- Location in Venezuela
- Coordinates: 9°34′23″N 63°31′51″W
- Country: Venezuela
- State: Monagas
- Municipal seat: Santa Bárbara[*]

Government
  - Mayor: Roselis León Castellanos (PSUV)

Area
  - Total: 371.6 km^{2} (143.5 sq mi)
- Time zone: UTC−4 (VET)

Santa Bárbara is one of the 13 municipalities of the state of Monagas, Venezuela. The municipality's capital is Santa Bárbara.

== History ==
In December 2021, Carmen Tillero was elected mayor of the municipality.

== Geography ==
The municipality Santa Bárbara is located to the west of the Monagas State. Has a tropical dry forest vegetation and another tropical humid forest, has an average annual temperature of 26.8 °C and rainfall of 1,092 mm (annual average).

== Economy ==
The economy is farm, among the main crops are sugarcane, cotton, maize, soy and sorghum.

== Culture ==
=== Public holidays ===
In December, they hold in honor of the patron of the municipality, Santa Barbara.

== Mayor ==
- José Malavé (2013—2017)(2017-2021). PSUV.
- Carmen Tillero (2021—2025). PSUV.
