= Rómulo Gallegos Municipality, Apure =

Rómulo Gallegos Municipality Municipio Rómulo Gallegos
- Municipality
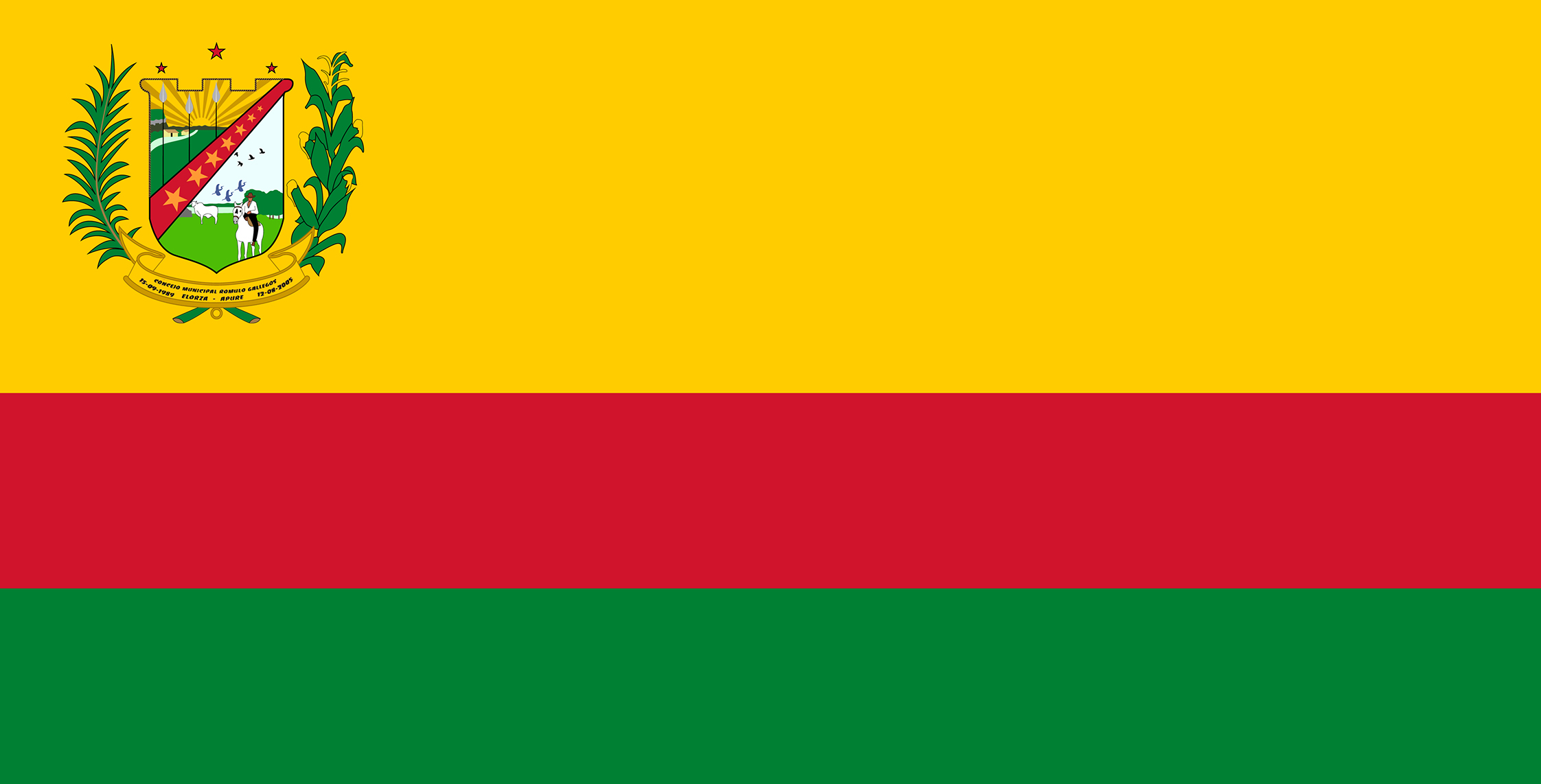
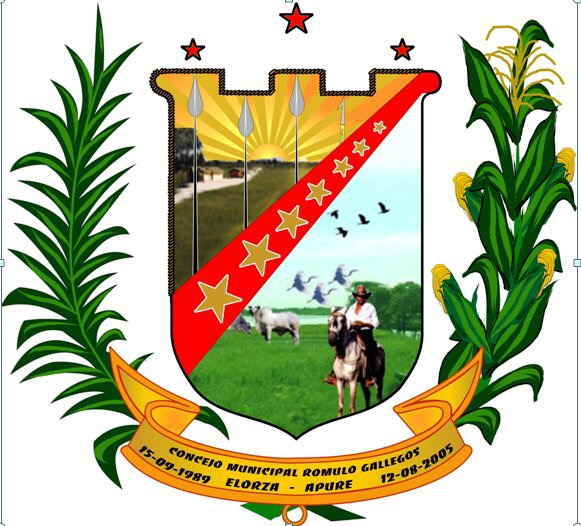
- Flag Coat of arms

- Location in Apure

- Location in Venezuela
- Coordinates: 6°49′42″N 69°26′31″W
- Country: Venezuela
- State: Apure
- Municipal seat: Elorza

Government
  - Mayor: Pedro Vicente Guerra (PSUV)

Area
  - Total: 11,764.4 km^{2} (4,542.3 sq mi)

Population (2011)
  - Total: 24,418
  - Density: 2.0756/km^{2} (5.3757/sq mi)
- Time zone: UTC−4 (VET)
- Area code(s): 0240
- Website: Official website

The Rómulo Gallegos Municipality is one of the seven municipalities (municipios) that makes up the Venezuelan state of Apure and, according to the 2011 census by the National Institute of Statistics of Venezuela, the municipality has a population of 24,418. The town of Elorza is the shire town of the Rómulo Gallegos Municipality.

== Name ==
The municipality is one of a number in Venezuela named "Rómulo Gallegos Municipality", in honour of the writer Rómulo Gallegos.

== Demographics ==
The Rómulo Gallegos Municipality, according to a 2007 population estimate by the National Institute of Statistics of Venezuela, has a population of 23,839 (up from 20,331 in 2000). This amounts to 5% of the state's population. The municipality's population density is 1.95 inhabitants per square kilometre (5.1/sq mi).

== Government ==
The mayor of the Rómulo Gallegos Municipality is Jesus Leopoldo Estrada Moreno, re-elected November 23, 2008 with 48% of the vote. The municipality is divided into two parishes; Urbana Elorza and La Trinidad.
