= Francisco Javier Pulgar Municipality =

Municipality in Zulia, Venezuela

Francisco Javier Pulgar Municipality Municipio Francisco Javier Pulgar
- Municipality
- Flag Seal

- Location in Zulia

- Location in Venezuela
- Country: Venezuela
- State: Zulia
- Founded: 1980
- Municipal seat: Pueblo Nuevo-El Chivo

Government
  - Mayor: Ervins Rosales (UNTC)

Area
  - Total: 854.3 km^{2} (329.8 sq mi)

Population (2020)
  - Total: 41,740
  - Density: 48.86/km^{2} (126.5/sq mi)
- Time zone: UTC−4 (VET)

Francisco Javier Pulgar Municipality is located in Zulia, Venezuela. It was founded in 1980. The municipality has a total surface of 800 km^{2} and it has some 41,740 inhabitant (2020 census). Its capital is Pueblo Nuevo-El Chivo.
