= Pedro Zaraza Municipality =

Pedro Zaraza Municipality Municipio Pedro Zaraza
- Municipality
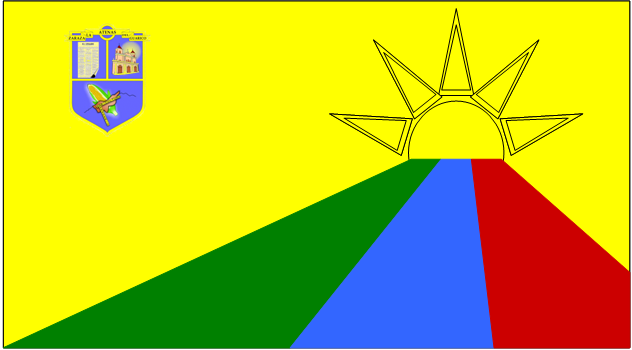
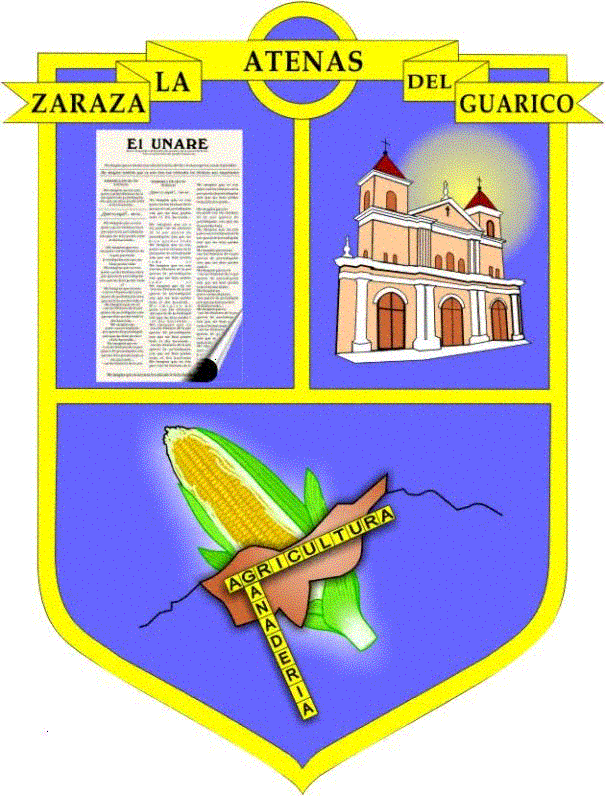
- Flag Coat of arms

- Location in Guárico

- Location in Venezuela
- Coordinates: 9°14′01″N 65°22′57″W
- Country: Venezuela
- State: Guárico
- Municipal seat: Zaraza

Government
  - Mayor: Carlos Castillo PSUV

Area
  - Total: 2,952.9 km^{2} (1,140.1 sq mi)

Population (2007)
  - Total: 60,595
  - Density: 20.521/km^{2} (53.148/sq mi)
- Time zone: UTC−4 (VET)
- Area code(s): 0238
- Website: Official website

The Pedro Zaraza Municipality is one of the 15 municipalities (municipios) that makes up the central Venezuelan state of Guárico and, according to a 2007 population estimate by the National Institute of Statistics of Venezuela, the municipality has a population of 60,595. The town of Zaraza is the shire town of the Pedro Zaraza Municipality.

== Demographics ==
The Pedro Zaraza Municipality, according to a 2007 population estimate by the National Institute of Statistics of Venezuela, has a population of 60,595 (up from 55,957 in 2000). This amounts to 8.1% of the state's population. The municipality's population density is 25.1 inhabitants per square kilometre (65/sq mi).

== Government ==
The mayor of the Pedro Zaraza Municipality is Freddi Ali Gomez, elected on November 23, 2008 The municipality is divided into two parishes; Capital Zaraza and San José de Unare.

== See also ==
- Zaraza
- Guárico
- Municipalities of Venezuela
