= Valmore Rodríguez Municipality =

Municipality in Zulia, Venezuela

Valmore Rodríguez Municipality Municipio Valmore Rodríguez
- Municipality
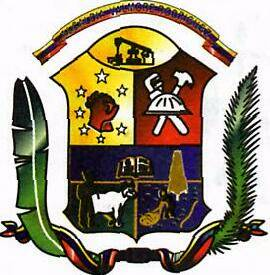
- Flag Seal

- Location in Zulia

- Location in Venezuela
- Country: Venezuela
- State: Zulia
- Founded: 1989

Government
  - Mayor: Jhon Zicardi (MUD)

Area
  - Total: 1,847.4 km^{2} (713.3 sq mi)

Population (2023)
  - Total: 62,673
  - Density: 33.925/km^{2} (87.865/sq mi)
- Time zone: UTC−4 (VET)

The Valmore Rodríguez Municipality is located in Zulia, Venezuela. It was founded in 1989. The municipality has a total surface of 1292 km^{2} and it has some 62,673 inhabitant (2023 census). Its capital is Bachaquero, in the Costa Oriental del Lago de Maracaibo.

The economy of the Valmore Rodríguez Municipality is predominantly oil-based, thanks to the numerous oil fields of the Bolívar Coastal Field. PDVSA and its subsidiaries are therefore one of the largest employers in the municipality. It is also worth noting that livestock farming and fishing have a significant impact on the local economy.
