= Antolín del Campo Municipality =

Antolín del Campo Municipality Municipio Antolín del Campo
- Municipality
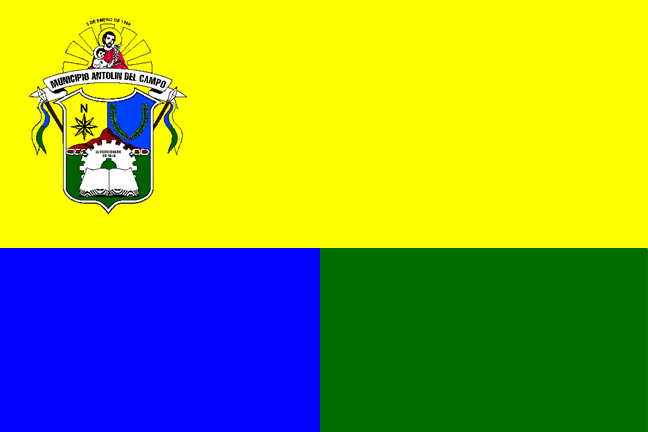
- Flag

- Location in Nueva Esparta

- Location in Venezuela
- Coordinates: 11°07′26″N 63°51′55″W
- Country: Venezuela
- State: Nueva Esparta
- Municipal seat: La Plaza de Paraguachí

Area
  - Total: 86.5 km^{2} (33.4 sq mi)

Population (2011)
  - Total: 28,089
  - Density: 325/km^{2} (841/sq mi)
- Time zone: UTC−4 (VET)
- Website: Official website

Antolín del Campo (Spanish: Municipio Antolín del Campo) is a municipality of Isla Margarita in the state of Nueva Esparta, Venezuela, named in honour of Lieutenant Colonel Francisco Antolín del Campo, a hero of the Battle of Matasiete during the Venezuelan War of Independence. The municipality occupies an area of 72 km² with a population of 28,089 inhabitants in 2011 and the capital is La Plaza de Paraguachí.

== Name ==
The municipality was named in honour of Lieutenant Colonel Francisco Antolín del Campo, a hero of the Battle of Matasiete during the Venezuelan War of Independence. There are tributes to him through several local landmarks, including a public plaza inaugurated in 1994, a commemorative golden bust, and an educational institution named Unidad Educativa Básica Antolín del Campo.

== Demographics ==
Based on the 2011 Venezuelan census, The population of the Antolín del Campo Municipality was 28,089 people, accounting for 5.64% of the total population of the state of Nueva Esparta. All of the population resides in La Plaza de Paraguachí, the municipal seat of the municipality.

By June 2019, official projections from the Venezuelan Statistics National Institute estimated the population of Antolín del Campo as 34,734 people, representing an annual growth rate of 21.7% since 2011 and showing a population density of 482.5 inhabitants/km² in an area of 72 km². However, these projections do not account for the impact of emigration linked to the country's recent economic and political circumstances.

The gender distribution of the population showed an even balance with 14,346 men (50.7%) and 13,948 women (49.3%). The age distribution showed that the largest segment of the population was aged 15 to 64, comprising 68.1% of the people. Younger people aged 0 to 14 made up 24.6% of the population, while those aged 65 and older accounted for the remaining 7.2%. All of the municipality's inhabitants live in the urban center of the capital city La Plaza de Paraguachí.

Ethnically, the municipality identified as predominantly White people (48.5%) and Mestizo (46.1%). Minority groups included 2.2% Afro-Venezuelans, 2.4% belonging to other ethnic groups, and 0.7% identifying as indigenous. The literacy rate was 97.1%, with 677 inhabitants of Antolín del Campo not able to read or write.

== Economy ==
Within the Antolín del Campo's economy, the coastal town of Manzanillo relies on artisanal fishing, where local livelihoods depend primarily on abundant sardine catches and seasonal octopus harvesting. However, this sector faces significant financial strain due to low profit margins driven by third-party resellers, high equipment maintenance costs, and reported extortion by regional security forces.
