= Cardenal Quintero Municipality =

Cardenal Quintero Municipality Municipio Cardenal Quintero
- Municipality
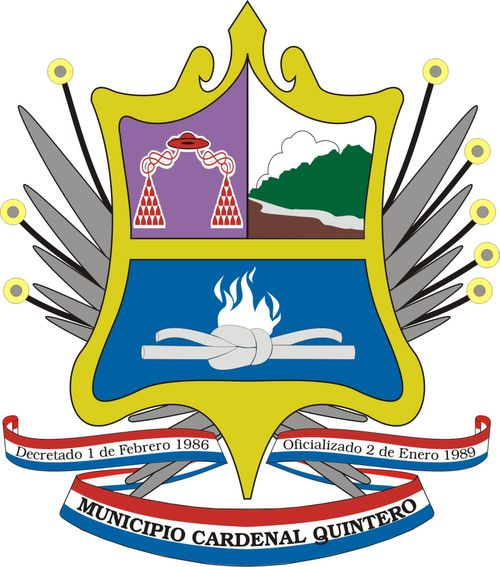
- Flag Coat of arms

- Location in Mérida

- Location in Venezuela
- Coordinates: 8°51′42″N 70°41′34″W
- Country: Venezuela
- State: Mérida
- Municipal seat: Santo Domingo

Government
  - Mayor: Yerika Malpica

Area
  - Total: 350 km^{2} (140 sq mi)

Population (2007)
  - Total: 9,546
  - Density: 27/km^{2} (71/sq mi)
- Time zone: UTC−4 (VET)
- Area code(s): 0274
- Website: Official website

The Cardenal Quintero Municipality is one of the 23 municipalities (municipios) that makes up the Venezuelan state of Mérida and, according to a 2007 population estimate by the National Institute of Statistics of Venezuela, the municipality has a population of 9,546. The town of Santo Domingo is the administrative centre of the Cardenal Quintero Municipality.

== Demographics ==
The Cardenal Quintero Municipality, according to a 2007 population estimate by the National Institute of Statistics of Venezuela, has a population of 9,546 (up from 8,049 in 2000). This amounts to 1.1% of the state's population. The municipality's population density is 27.3 inhabitants per square kilometre (71/sq mi).

== Government ==
The mayor of the Cardenal Quintero Municipality is Pedro Segundo Rivas Moreno, re-elected on October 31, 2004, with 89% of the vote. The municipality is divided into two parishes; Capital Cardenal Quintero and Las Piedras.

== See also ==
- Santo Domingo
- Mérida
- Municipalities of Venezuela
