= Santa Bárbara, Monagas =

Populated place in Venezuela

Santa Bárbara Santa Bárabara de Tapirín
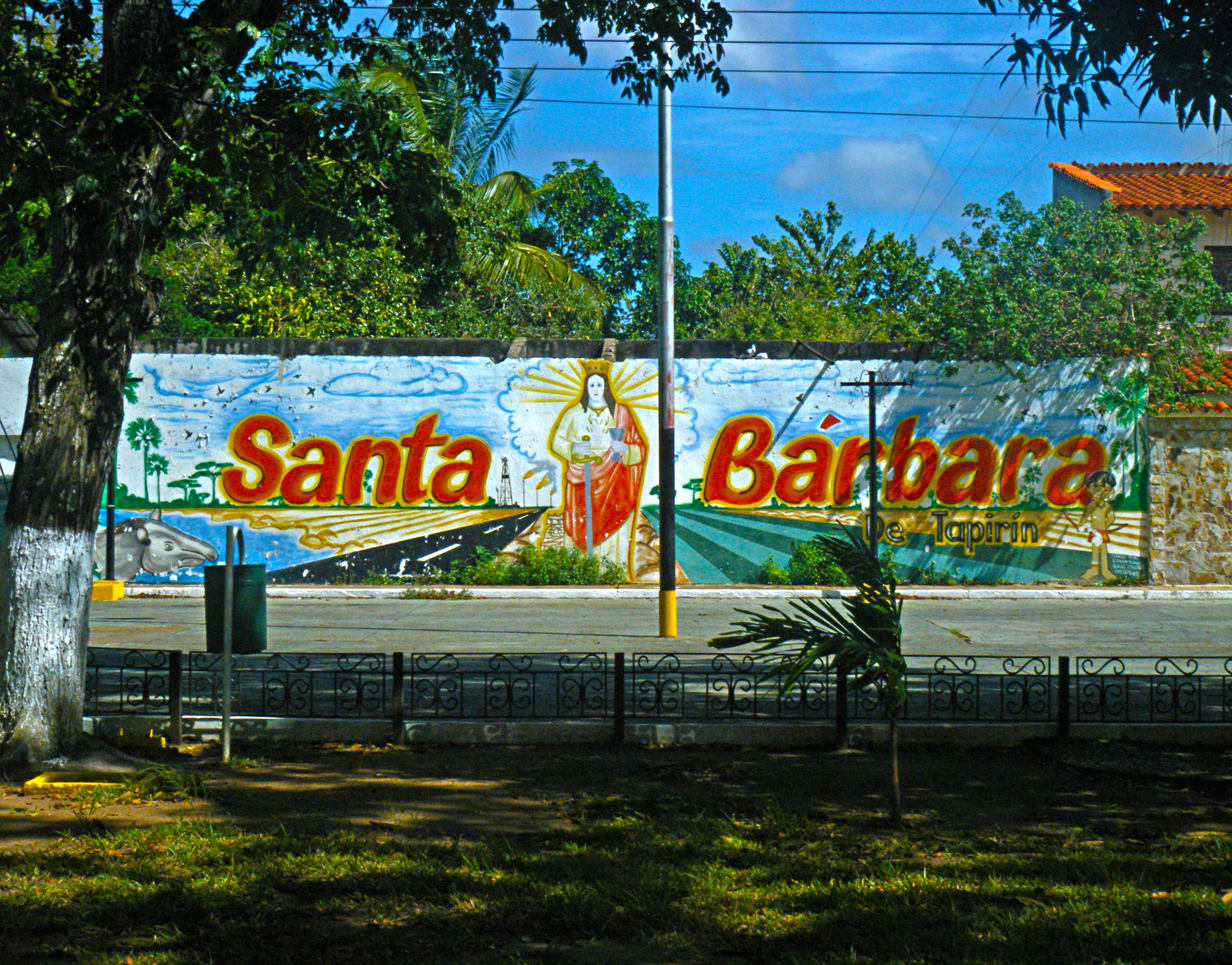

- Location in Venezuela
- Coordinates: 9°36′0″N 63°36′0″W
- Country: Venezuela
- State: Monagas
- Municipality: Santa Bárbara
- Established: March 13, 1754
- Founder: Casimiro de Borja
- Time zone: UTC-4 (VET)

Santa Bárbara also known as Santa Bárbara de Tapirín, is the capital of the municipality of Santa Bárbara in the state of Monagas in Venezuela.

== History ==
Initially it was a settlement called Tapirín, then it was named Santa Bárbara de Tapirín and with the passing of time it was simply called Santa Bárbara. It was founded on 13 March 1754, by Father Casimiro de Borja.

== Economy ==
Commercial and service activities are concentrated mainly in Santa Bárbara.

== Places of interest ==
- Casa Cultural Simón Bolívar.
- Capilla en honor a Santa Eduvigis.
- Plaza Bolívar (Bolivar Square).
- Iglesia Santa Barbara (Church Santa Barbara), founded on 1754.
- Cruz de Santa Barbara (Santa Barbara cross), it is a monument.
- Balneario Río Queregua.
- Parque Santa Eduvigis (Santa Eduvigis park).
- Monumento en honor a la heroína Rosalia Ramírez de Barreto (Monument in honor of the heroine Rosalia Ramirez de Barreto), it is a sculpture by Estanislao Della Monica, which represents the execution of Matilde Ramirez, an event that occurred in 1814.
