= Rómulo Gallegos Municipality =

Rómulo Gallegos Municipality may refer to the following places in the Venezuela:

- Rómulo Gallegos Municipality, Apure
- Rómulo Gallegos Municipality, Cojedes
