= Mara Municipality =

Municipality in Zulia, Venezuela

Mara Municipality Municipio Mara
- Municipality
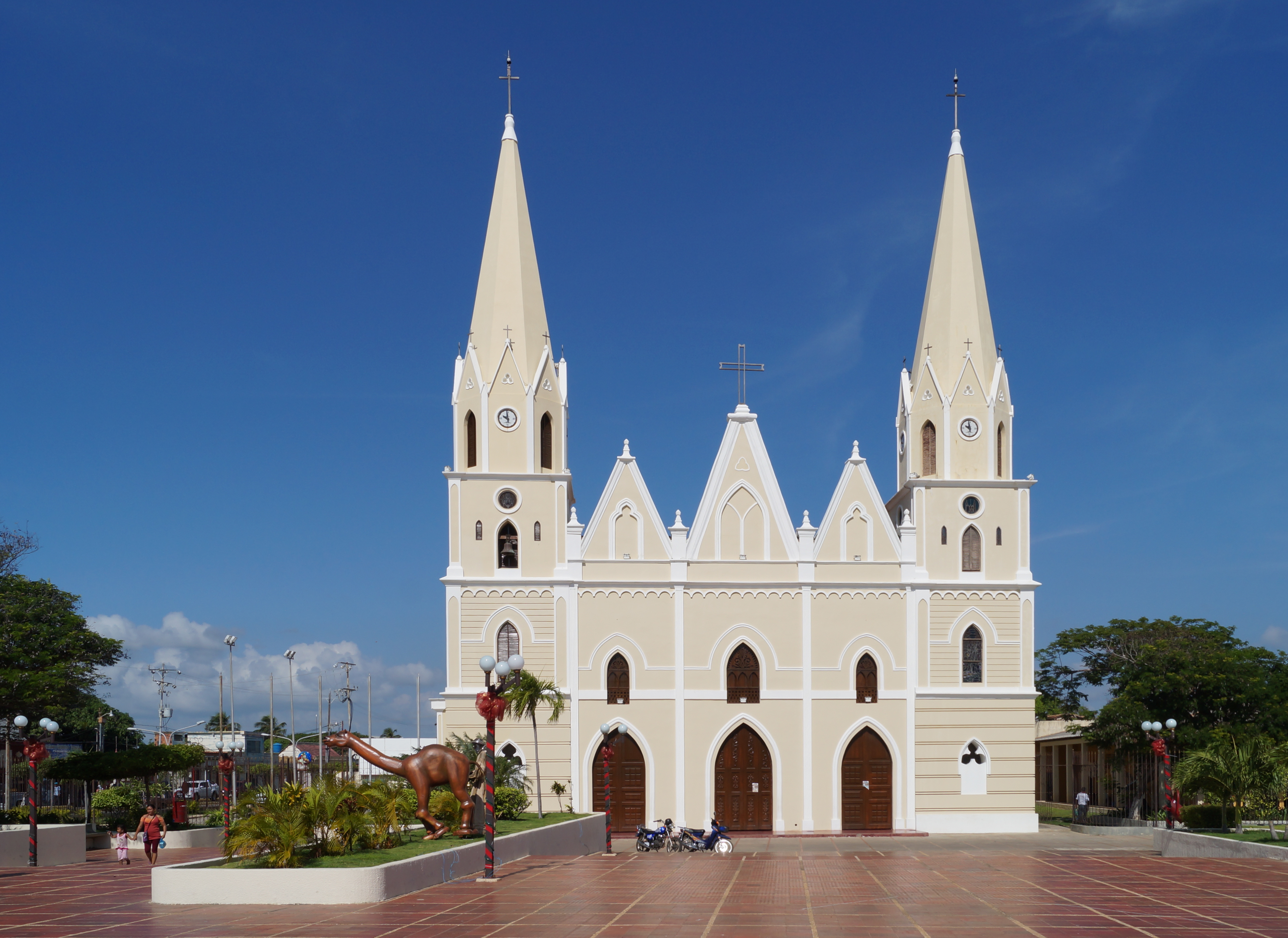

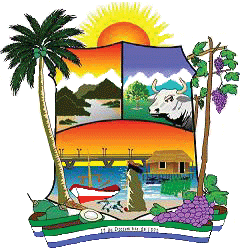
- Flag Seal

- Location in Zulia

- Location in Venezuela
- Country: Venezuela
- State: Zulia
- Founded: 1989
- Municipal seat: San Rafael del Moján

Government
  - Mayor: Edgar Labarca (PSUV)

Area
  - Total: 3,285.3 km^{2} (1,268.5 sq mi)

Population (2023)
  - Total: 251,044
  - Density: 76.414/km^{2} (197.91/sq mi)
- Time zone: UTC−4 (VET)

Mara Municipality is located in Zulia, Venezuela. It was founded in 1989. The municipality has a total surface of 3588 km^{2} and it has some 251,044 inhabitant (2023 census). Its capital is San Rafael del Moján.
