= Catatumbo Municipality =

Municipality in Zulia, Venezuela

Catatumbo Municipality Municipio Catatumbo
- Municipality
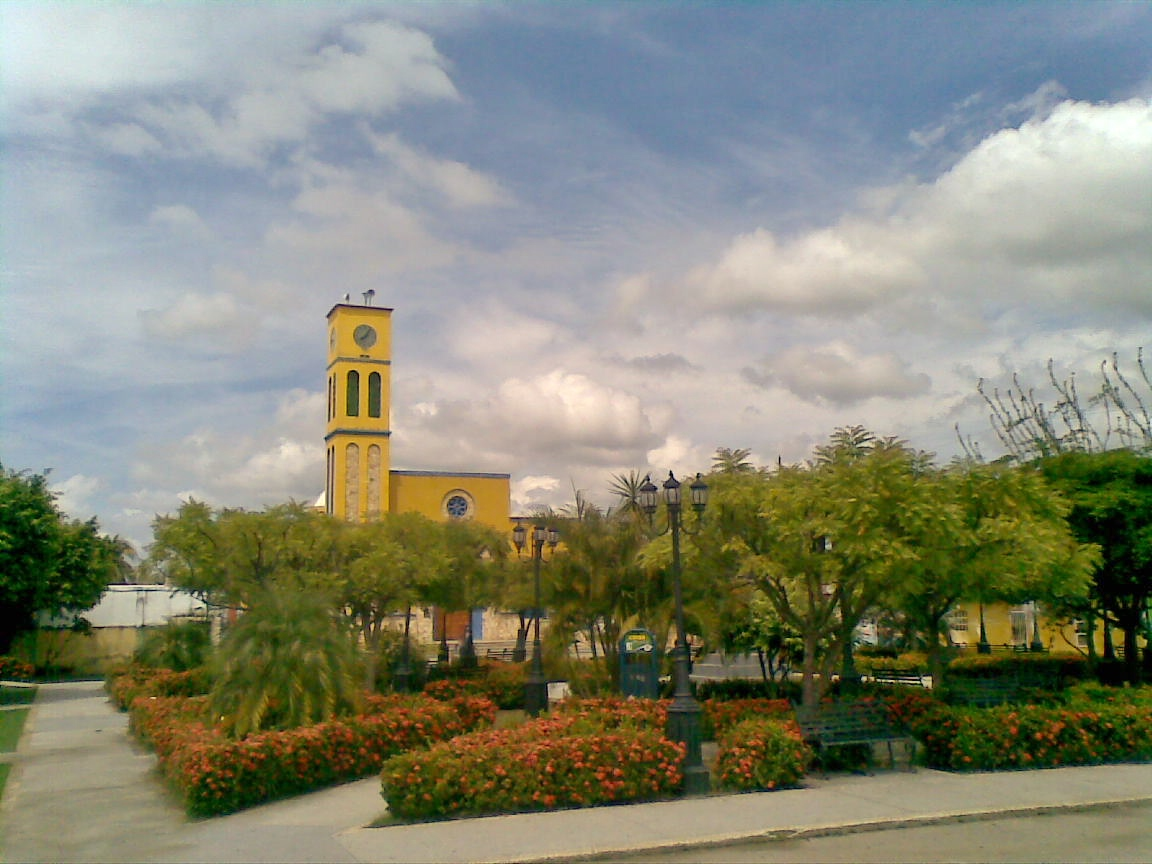

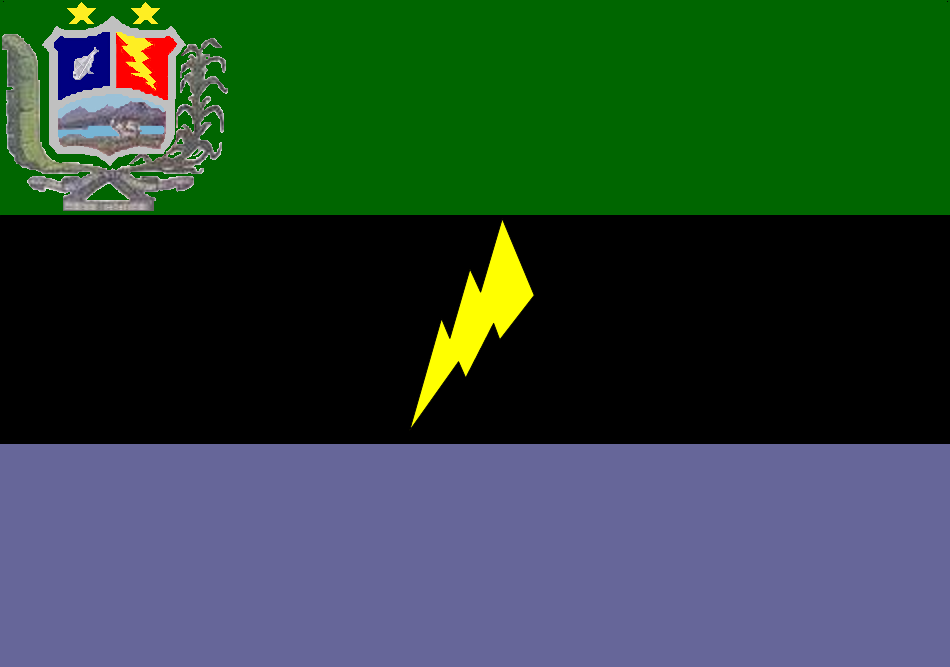
- Flag Seal

- Location in Zulia

- Location in Venezuela
- Country: Venezuela
- State: Zulia
- Founded: 1980
- Municipal seat: Encontrados

Government
  - Mayor: Wilmer Enrique Ariza Meza (PSUV)

Area
  - Total: 6,575.1 km^{2} (2,538.7 sq mi)

Population (2016)
  - Total: 106,114
  - Density: 16.139/km^{2} (41.799/sq mi)
- Time zone: UTC−4 (VET)

Catatumbo Municipality is located in Zulia, Venezuela. It was founded in 1980. The municipality has a total surface of 5225 km^{2} and it has some 106,114 inhabitant (2016 census). Its capital is Encontrados.
