= Barbacoas, Aragua =

Barbacoas
- Location within Venezuela
- Coordinates: 9°29′0″N 66°58′34″W
- Country: Venezuela
- State: Aragua
- Municipality: Urdaneta Municipality
- Founded: 1712
- Elevation: 557 m (1,827 ft)

Population
  - Total: 16,469
  - Demonym: Barbacoense
- Time zone: UTC−4 (VET)
- Postal code: 2301
- Area code: 0246

Barbacoas is a city in the state of Aragua, Venezuela. It is the shire town of the Urdaneta Municipality.

It was founded, in 1712, with the name San Andrés de Aricapano de Barbacoas, and during the eighteenth century was known as "Partido de Aricapano".

== See also ==
- List of cities and towns in Venezuela
