= Punta de Mata =

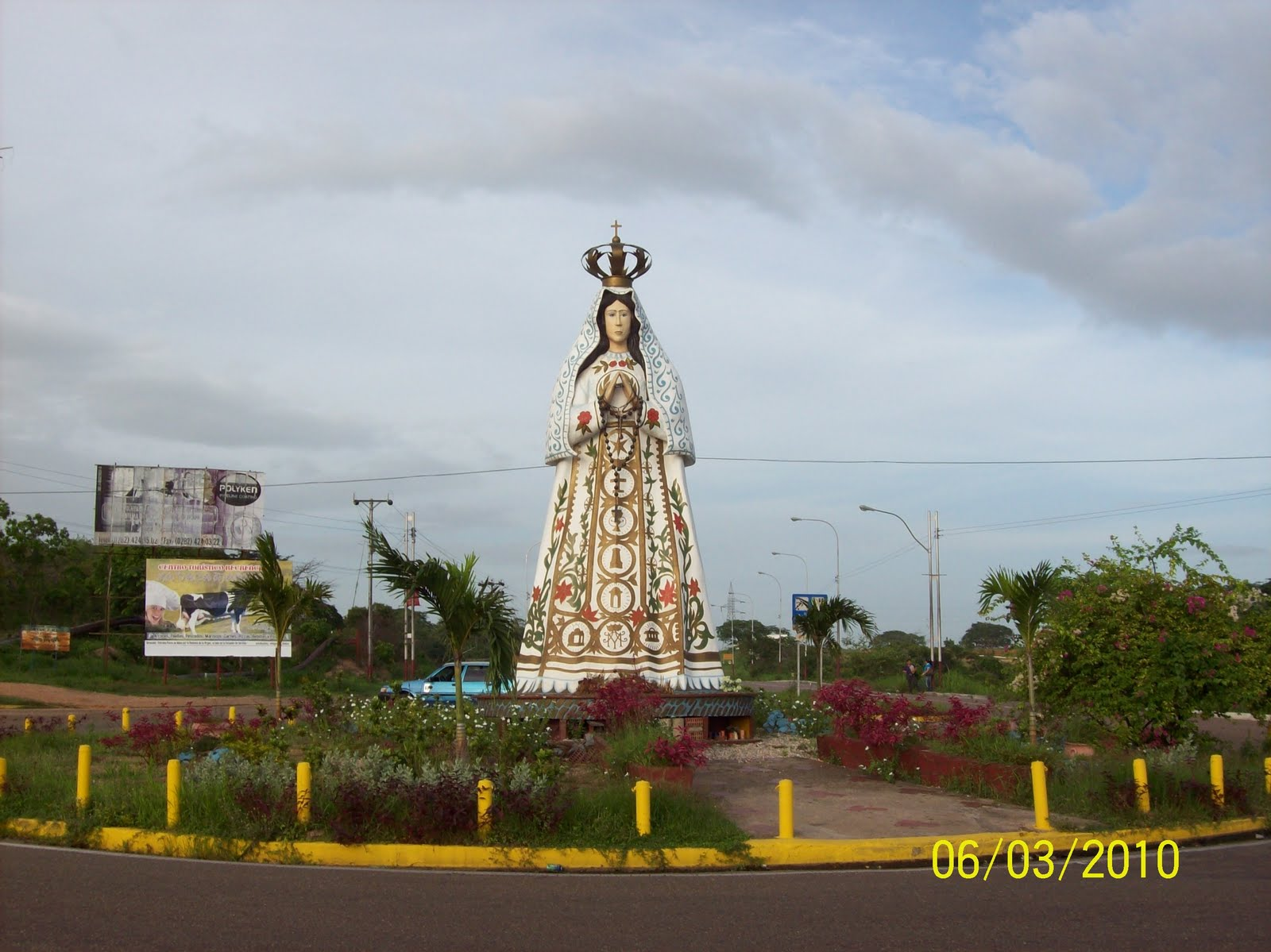

- Location within Venezuela
- Country: Venezuela
- State: Monagas
- Municipality: Ezequiel Zamora

Population (2019)
  - Total: 57,000
- Postal code: 6217

Punta de Mata is the municipal capital of the municipality of Ezequiel Zamora in the state of Monagas in Venezuela.
