= Maracaibo Municipality =

Municipality in Zulia, Venezuela

Maracaibo Municipality Municipio Maracaibo
- Municipality
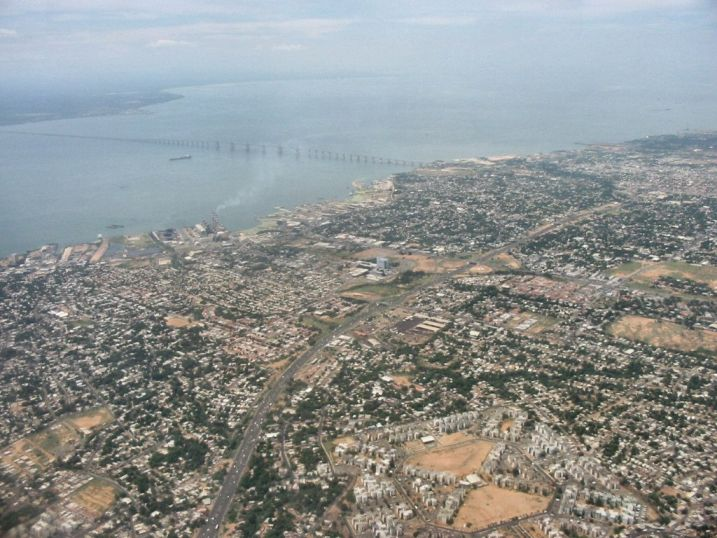

- Flag Seal

- Location in Zulia

- Location in Venezuela
- Country: Venezuela
- State: Zulia
- Founded: 1529
- Municipal seat: Maracaibo

Government
  - Mayor: Gian Carlo Di Martino (PSUV)

Area
  - Total: 408.1 km^{2} (157.6 sq mi)

Population (2023)
  - Total: 1,972,040
  - Density: 4,832/km^{2} (12,520/sq mi)
- Time zone: UTC−4 (VET)

Maracaibo Municipality is located in Zulia, Venezuela. It was founded in 1529. The municipality has a total surface of 1393 km^{2} and it has some 1,972,040 inhabitant (2023 census). Its capital is Maracaibo.
