= Pueblo Llano Municipality =

Pueblo Llano Municipality Municipio Pueblo Llano
- Municipality
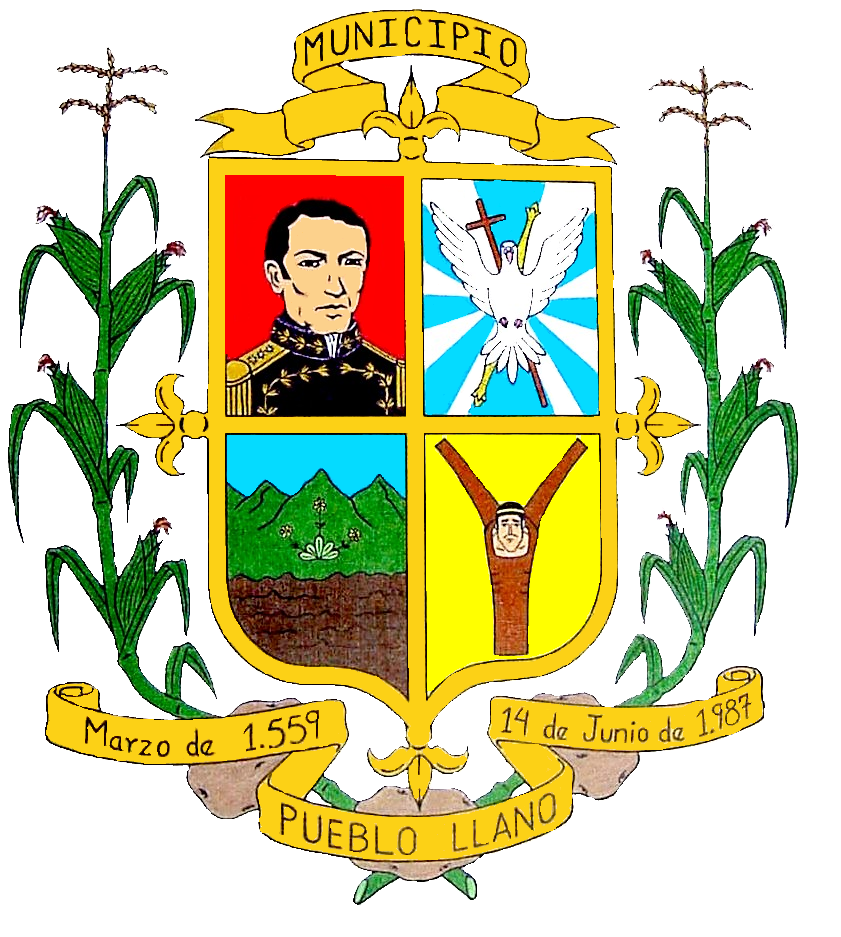
- Flag Coat of arms

- Location in Mérida

- Location in Venezuela
- Coordinates: 8°54′53″N 70°39′33″W
- Country: Venezuela
- State: Mérida

Government
  - Mayor: Yuri Ramírez (PSUV)

Area
  - Total: 89 km^{2} (34 sq mi)

Population (2007)
  - Total: 11,706
  - Density: 130/km^{2} (340/sq mi)
- Time zone: UTC−4 (VET)
- Area code(s): 0274
- Website: Official website

The Pueblo Llano Municipality is one of the 23 municipalities (municipios) that makes up the Venezuelan state of Mérida and, according to a 2007 population estimate by the National Institute of Statistics of Venezuela, the municipality has a population of 11,706. The town of Pueblo Llano is the shire town of the Pueblo Llano Municipality.

== History ==
The municipality was part of the Miranda Municipality until 14 June 1987, when it became the Autonomous Municipality Pueblo Llano. It dropped "autonomous" from its name in 1992. Pueblo Llano, 105.1 FM, was launched in 1992.

== Geography ==
The municipality is located in the north east of Mérida in the Venezuelan Andes. The area is mountainous, with an average altitude of 2300m. Average annual temperatures are around 18 °C.

== Demographics ==
The Pueblo Llano Municipality, according to a 2007 population estimate by the National Institute of Statistics of Venezuela, has a population of 11,706 (up from 9,792 in 2000). This amounts to 1.4% of the state's population. The municipality's population density is 211.6 people per square mile (81.7 people/km^{2}).

== Government ==
The mayor of the Pueblo Llano Municipality is Antonio José Santiago Santiago, re-elected on October 31, 2004, with 86% of the vote. The municipality is divided into one parish (Capital Pueblo Llano).
