= Santa Rita Municipality =

Municipality in Zulia, Venezuela

Santa Rita Municipality Municipio Santa Rita
- Municipality
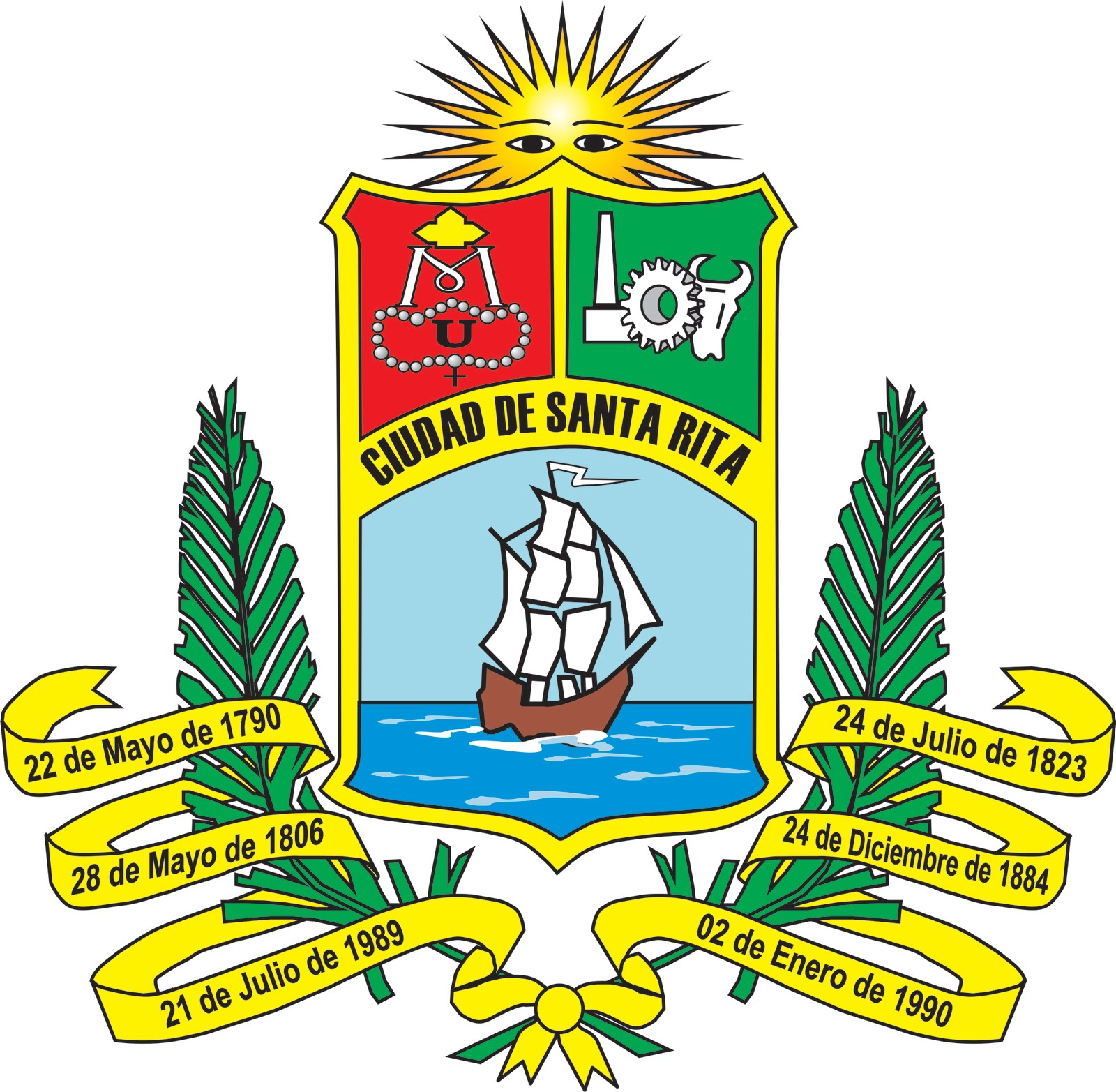
- Flag Seal

- Location in Zulia

- Location in Venezuela
- Country: Venezuela
- State: Zulia
- Founded: 1989
- Municipal seat: Santa Rita

Government
  - Mayor: Liz Carolina Piña (PSUV)

Area
  - Total: 563.8 km^{2} (217.7 sq mi)

Population (2023)
  - Total: 61,603
  - Density: 109.3/km^{2} (283.0/sq mi)
- Time zone: UTC−4 (VET)

Santa Rita Municipality is located in Zulia, Venezuela. It was founded in 1980. The municipality has a total surface of 578 km^{2} and it has some 61,603 inhabitant (2023 census). Its capital is Santa Rita.
