= Veroes Municipality =

Veroes Municipality Municipio Veroes
- Municipality
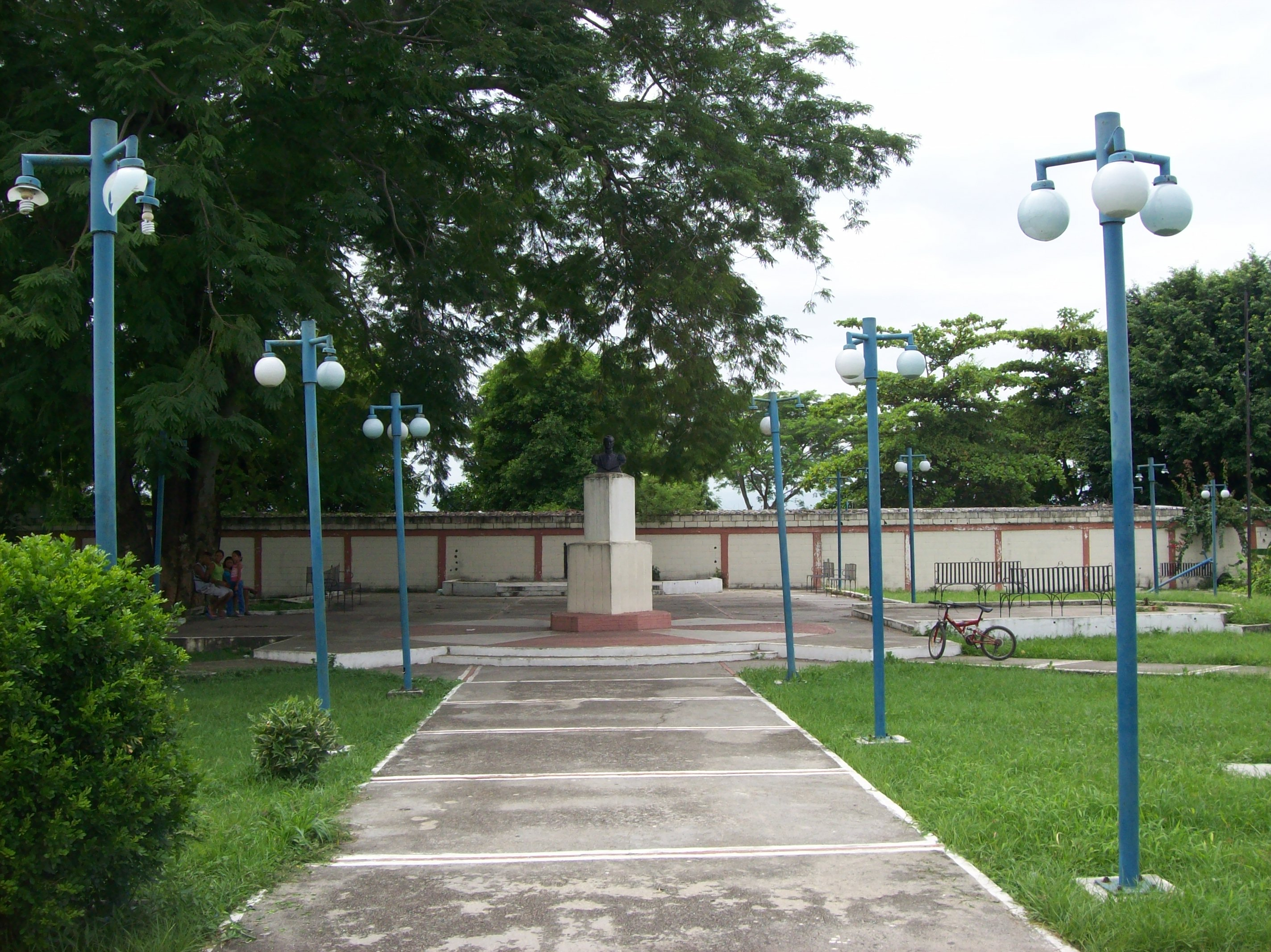
- Plaza Bolívar in Farriar

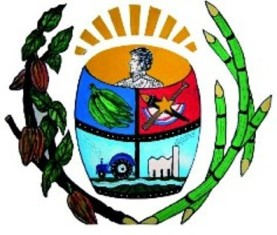
- Flag Coat of arms

- Location in Yaracuy

- Location in Venezuela
- Coordinates: 10°25′03″N 68°30′44″W
- Country: Venezuela
- State: Yaracuy
- Established: 5 November 1993
- Municipal seat: Farriar

Government
  - Mayor: Leonardo Machado (PSUV)

Area
  - Total: 1,065 km^{2} (411 sq mi)

Population (2011)
  - Total: 27,840
- Time zone: UTC−4 (VET)
- Website: Official website

Veroes Municipality is one of the 14 municipalities of the state of Yaracuy, Venezuela. Its municipal seat is Farriar. The municipality occupies an area of 1,059 km^{2} (409 sq mi) with a population of 27,840 inhabitants according to the 2011 census. The municipality was named after Venezuelan military officer José Joaquín Veroes.

== History ==
Veroes Municipality was constituted in 1909, which came after Yaracuy was granted its permanent autonomy, and was administered within the District of San Felipe at the time. The municipal capital was originally located in the town of El Chino, but in 1935, it was relocated to the community of La Rosita, which was renamed Farriar. On 5 November 1993, Veroes was granted full autonomy as a municipality.

On 24 June 2026, doublet strike-slip earthquakes struck northwestern and central Venezuela with epicentres in Veroes municipality: a magnitude 7.2 foreshock at 18:04 local time, followed by 39 seconds later by a magnitude 7.5 mainshock. The earthquakes struck on a public holiday, when many people were taking part in Saint John the Baptist drum festivities that day.

== Demographics ==
Based on the 2011 Venezuelan census, The population of the Veroes Municipality was 27,840 people, accounting for 9.81% of the total population of the state of Yaracuy. A majority of the population (10.77%) resides in Farriar, the municipal seat of the municipality.

By June 2019, official projections from the Venezuelan Statistics National Institute estimated the population of Nirgua as 32,249 people, representing an annual growth rate of 1.5% since 2011 and showing a population density of 30.45 inhabitants/km^{2}. However, these projections do not account for the impact of emigration linked to the country's recent economic and political circumstances.

The gender distribution of the population showed an even balance with 14,449 men (51.9%) and 13,391 women (48.1%). The age distribution showed that the largest segment of the population was aged 15 to 64, comprising 62.2% of the people. Younger people aged 0 to 14 made up 32.9% of the population, while those aged 65 and older accounted for the remaining 4.9%. The municipality is mostly ruralized, with 67.6% of the inhabitants (18,807) living in urban centers compared to 32.4% (9,033) in rural areas.

Ethnically, the municipality identified as predominantly Mestizo (56.4%), White people (23.1%) and Afro-Venezuelans (19.5%). Minority groups included 1% belonging to other ethnic groups, with 23 individuals identifying as indigenous. The literacy rate was 90%, with 2,174 inhabitants of Veroes not able to read or write.

== Parishes ==
The municipality is divided into the following two parishes:

#	Municipality	Seat
1	Farriar	Farriar
2	El Guayabo	Casimiro Vásquez
