= Farriar =

- Town
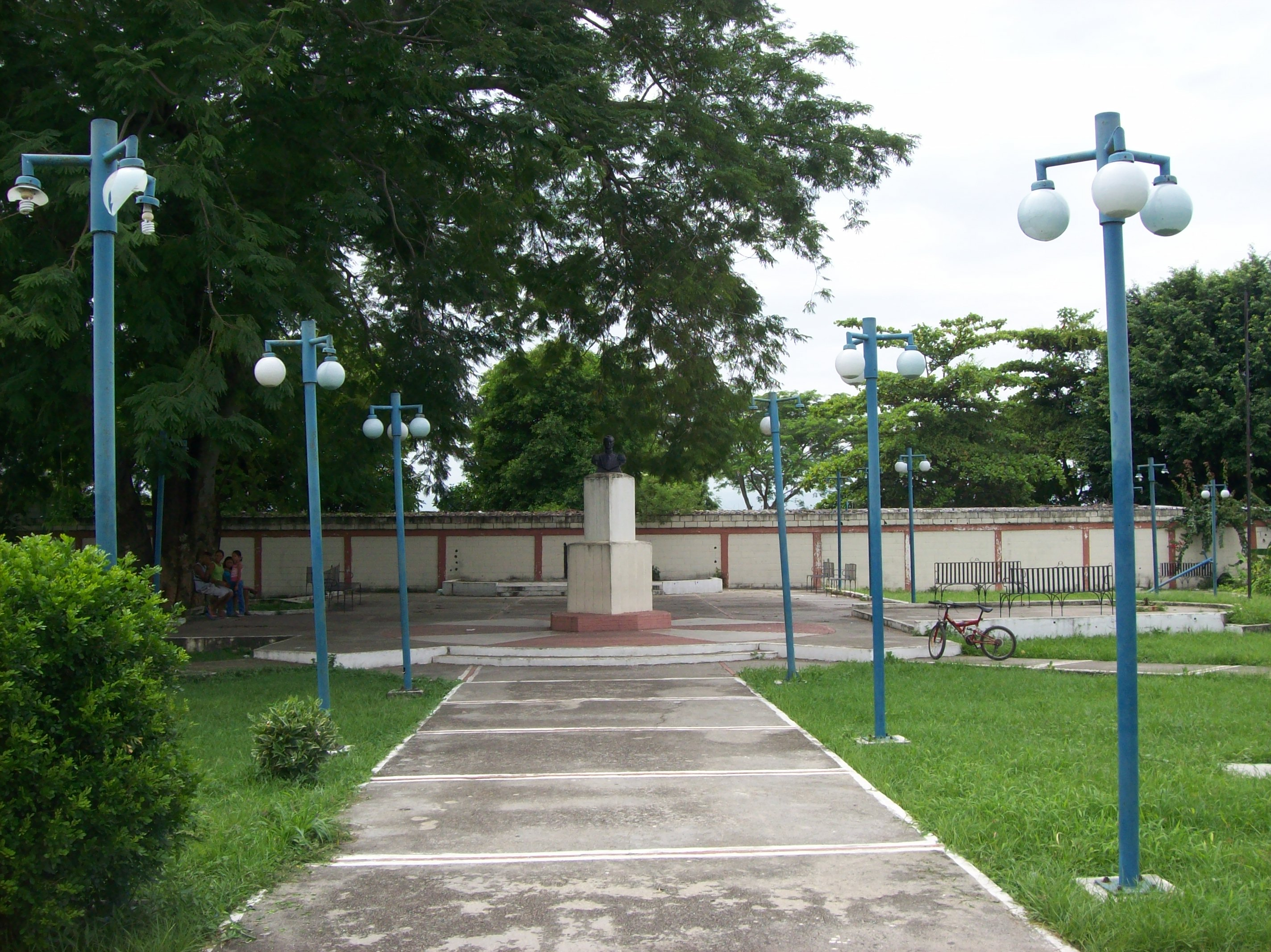
- Plaza Bolívar in Farriar

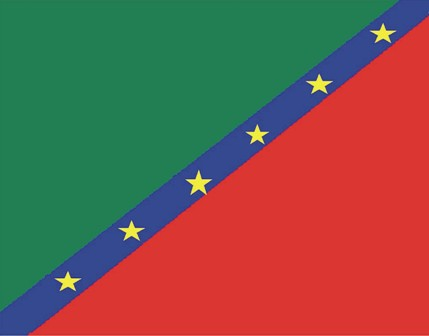
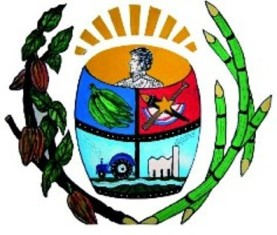
- Flag Coat of arms

- Location in Venezuela
- Coordinates: 10°28′13″N 68°33′29″W
- Country: Venezuela
- State: Yaracuy
- Municipality: Veroes

Government
  - Mayor: Leonardo Machado (PSUV)

Area
  - Total: 105 km^{2} (41 sq mi)
- Elevation: 25 m (82 ft)

Population (2011)
  - Total: 2,999
  - Density: 28.6/km^{2} (74.0/sq mi)
- Time zone: UTC−4 (VET)
- Postal code(s): 3222

Farriar is a town and the seat of the Veroes Municipality in the state of Yaracuy, Venezuela.

Farriar covers about 105 km^{2} (41 sq mi) and had a population of 2,999 at the 2011 census. The town also the seat of the eponymous parish of Farriar. It is well known for its Afro-Venezuelan communities, sometimes called the "Zona Negra" (Black Zone) of Yaracuy, and for the Saint John the Baptist drum festival held in the town.

== History ==
Since the colonial period most of the area's inhabitants have been of African descent, brought to the region through the slave trade to work on the cocoa and sugar-cane plantations.

From 1730 and 1733 the zambo Andresote (Andrés López del Rosario) led a revolt in the valley of the Yaracuy River, together with enslaved and free black people, mestizos and Indigenous people of the area. The uprising was directed against the Guipuzcoan Company, which held a monopoly on trade between Venezuela and Spain and cracked down on the contraband trade in cocoa and tobacco with the Dutch at Curaçao; Andresote had the backing of Creole planters and Dutch smugglers who wanted that trade to continue. After Spanish officers were initially unable to defeat him, the governor of the Province of Venezuela, Sebastián García de la Torre, took command in person and reached Yaracuy on 11 February 1732; Andresote evaded him and escaped by ship to Curaçao, where he later died. The revolt is regarded by Venezuelan historians as a forerunner of the country's independence movement, and is the subject of Carlos Felice Cardot's monograph La rebelión de Andresote (1957).

The community that became the municipal capital was founded around 1875 under the name La Rosita, by Afro-descendant families—which included the Parra, Barboza, Ilarraza, and Bolívar families—who had come from the nearby community of Agua Negra. The Veroes Municipality was constituted in 1909, after the state of Yaracuy was definitively established, and was administered within the then District of San Felipe. The municipal capital was originally located in the town of El Chino, but in 1935 it was moved to the community of La Rosita, which was renamed Farriar. On 5 November 1993, Veroes was granted full autonomy as a municipality.

On 24 June 2026, Farriar was affected by two large strike-slip earthquakes that struck northern Venezuela with epicentres in the municipality of Veroes: a magnitude 7.2 foreshock at 18:04 local time, followed 39 seconds later by a magnitude 7.5 mainshock. The earthquakes struck on a public holiday, when several people had been taking part in the Saint John the Baptist drum festivities held that day.

== Geography ==
Farriar is located near the banks of the Yaracuy River and the southern slope of the Sierra de Aroa, in the low-lying part of Yaracuy. The Yaracuy River runs through the centre of Veroes, in the lower part of its basin, and reaches the Caribbean Sea near the boundary with Carabobo state. The valley floor along the river is prone to periodic flooding and slow drainage, and parts of the southern municipality show colline (piedmont) relief. Because Farriar close to the low banks of the river, it is subject to recurring floods.

== Demographics ==
Farriar had 2,561 inhabitants at the 2001 census and 2,999 at the 2011 census. The great majority of the population is of African descent, and community organisations in the town identify as Afro-descendant or Afro-Venezuelan.

== Economy ==
The Yaracuy River makes the land very fertile, and much of the sugar cane produced in Yaracuy comes from Veroes. Industry in the municipality has included the Central Azucarero Veroes sugar mill (no longer operating). Plantains and cassava are staple crops, and local crafts include the making of wooden mortars (pilones).

From the early 2000s, Afro-Venezuelan communal organisations became active in the Farriar. The Unión de Cooperativas Afrodescendientes José Leonardo Chirino, grouped around 40 cooperatives around Farriar.

== Culture ==
Farriar forms part of the state's "Zona Negra". The Roman Catholic religion has long been part of community life, blended with practices rooted in the region's African heritage.

The best-known tradition is the drum festival for Saint John the Baptist (parranda or parrandón de San Juan Bautista). The celebration begins on 1 June in Agua Negra and builds through the month with drumming and sangueo singing until 23 June; on the feast day of 24 June, the area draws visitors from other communities. Local performers use drums known as the tambor afroyaracuyano and sing genres such as the cantos de sirena and loangos. Veroes hosts the state's Encuentro Estadal de la Parranda de San Juan Bautista, and a municipal decree established a local Day of the Tambor Luango, a drum treated as a symbol of Afro-Yaracuyan identity. Other observances in the municipality include the festivals of Saint Peter, Our Lady of Lourdes (patroness of Farriar), and the Velorio de la Cruz de Mayo.

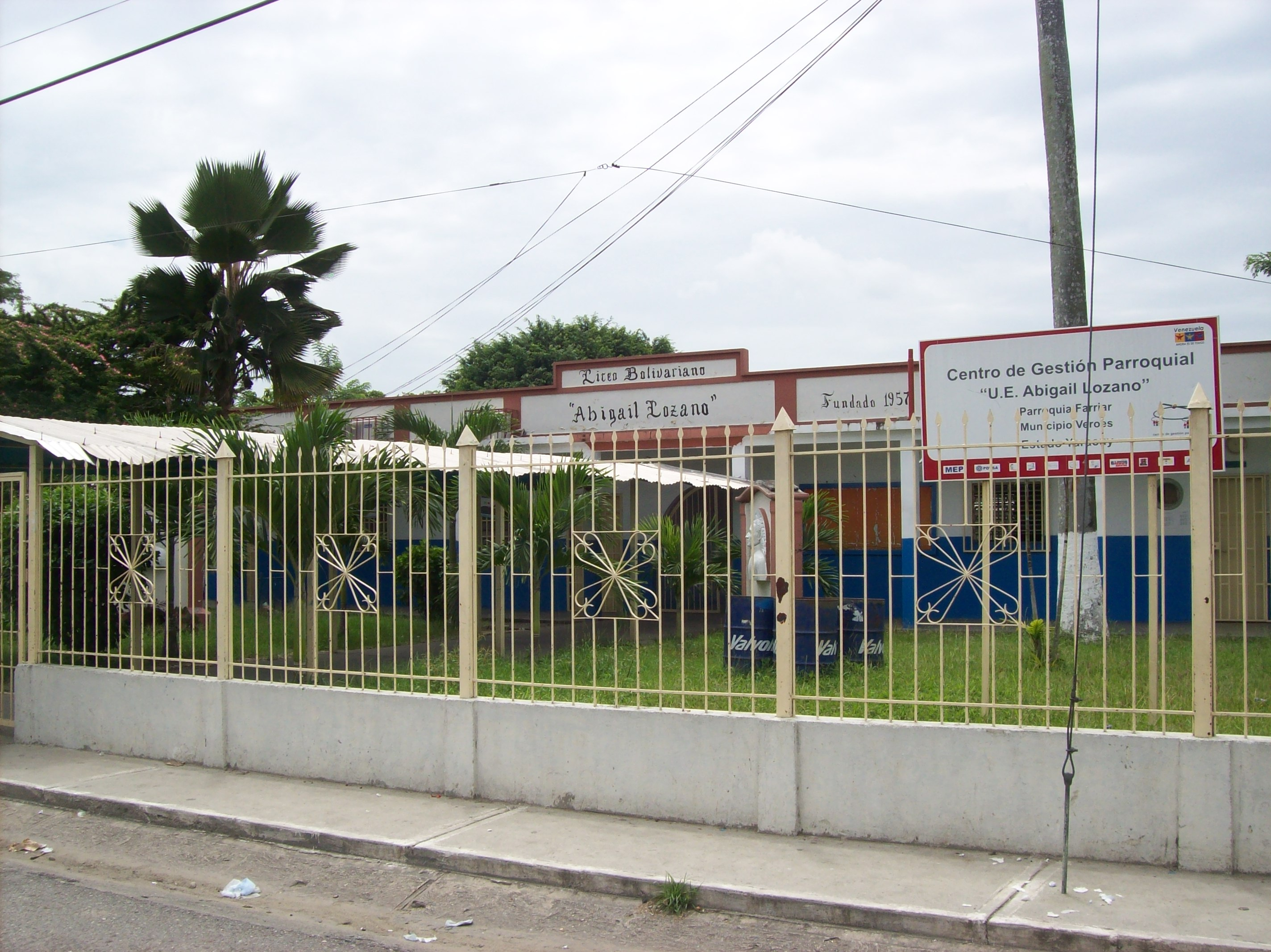
The Abigaíl Lozano secondary school in Farriar

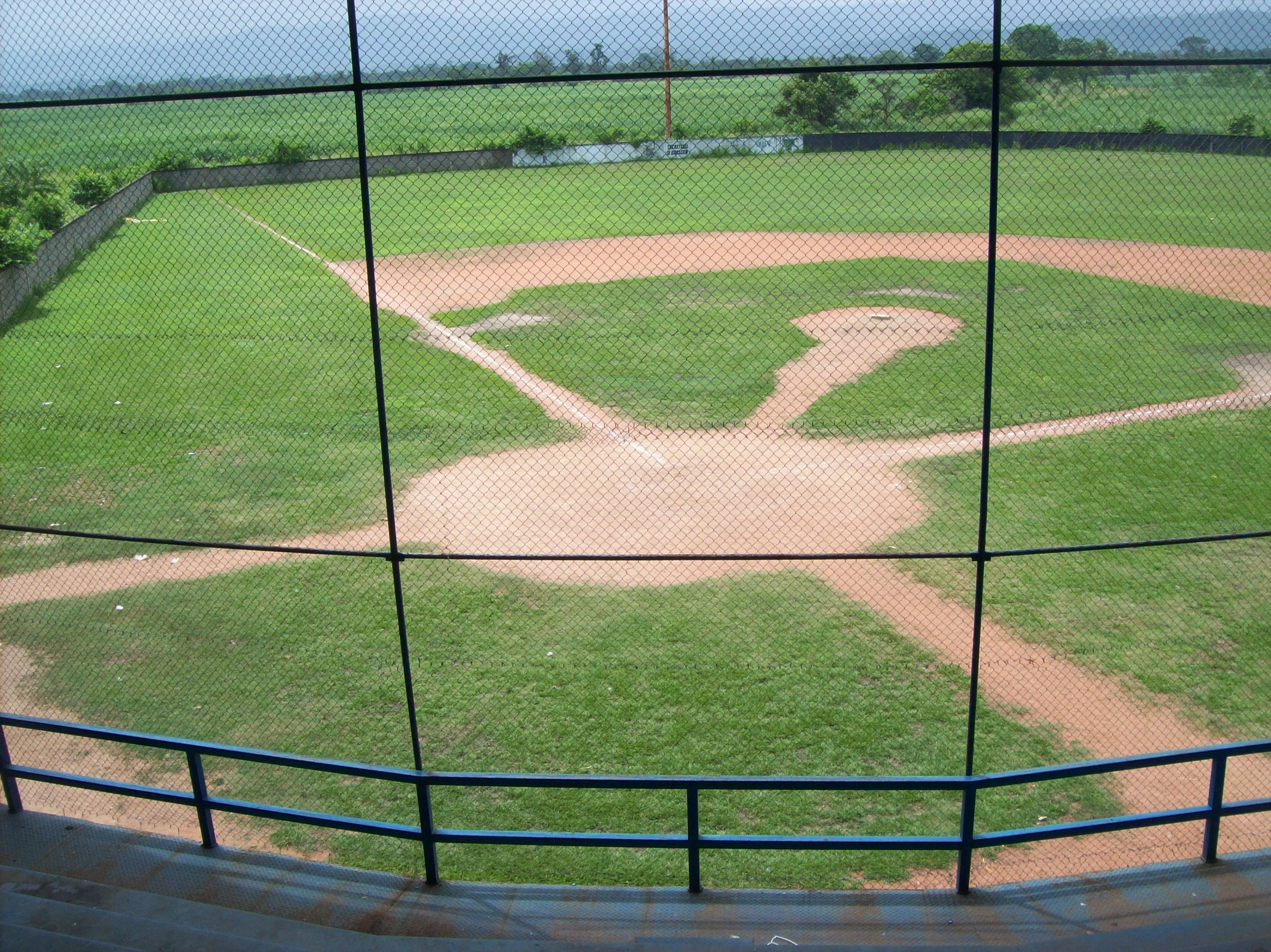
Estrellas de Veroes baseball stadium, Farriar

== See also ==
- Afro-Venezuelans
- Yaracuy
