= Mamporal =

- City
- Location within Venezuela
- Coordinates: 10°22′N 66°08′W
- Country: Venezuela
- State: Miranda
- Municipality: Buroz Municipality
- Founded: 16 January 1738
- Time zone: VST
- Climate: Am

Mamporal is a city in Miranda State, Venezuela. It is the capital of Buroz Municipality. Its name is said to derive from the indigenous word mampora, a name for a local plant.

== Notable residents ==
- Carlos Quintana (born 1965) Major Leagues baseball player
