= Rómulo Gallegos Municipality, Cojedes =

Rómulo Gallegos Municipality Municipio Rómulo Gallegos
- Municipality
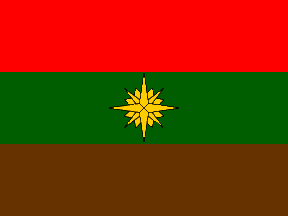
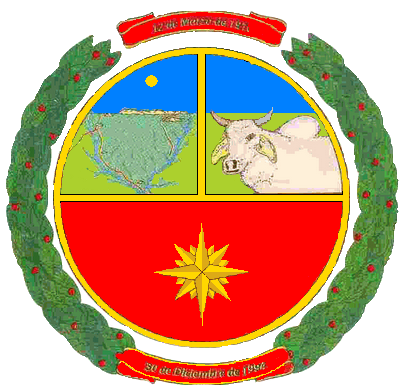
- Flag Coat of arms

- Location in Cojedes

- Location in Venezuela
- Coordinates: 9°20′12″N 68°29′10″W
- Country: Venezuela
- State: Cojedes

Government
  - Mayor: Abraham Martin Lavado (VVC)

Area
  - Total: 999.0 km^{2} (385.7 sq mi)

Population (2011)
  - Total: 18,297
  - Density: 18.32/km^{2} (47.44/sq mi)
- Time zone: UTC−4 (VET)
- Area code(s): 0258

The Rómulo Gallegos Municipality is one of the nine municipalities (municipios) that makes up the Venezuelan state of Cojedes and, according to the 2011 census by the National Institute of Statistics of Venezuela, the municipality has a population of 18,297. The town of Las Vegas is the municipal seat of the Rómulo Gallegos Municipality. The municipality is one of a number in Venezuela named "Rómulo Gallegos Municipality", in honour of the writer Rómulo Gallegos.

== Demographics ==
The Rómulo Gallegos Municipality, according to a 2007 population estimate by the National Institute of Statistics of Venezuela, has a population of 15,141 (up from 12,815 in 2000). This amounts to 5% of the state's population. The municipality's population density is 20.88 inhabitants per square kilometre (54.1/sq mi).

== Government ==
The mayor of the Rómulo Gallegos Municipality is Jesus Francisco Oviedo Guerra, elected on October 31, 2004, with 51% of the vote. He replaced Alberto Molina shortly after the elections. The municipality is divided into one parish; Rómulo Gallegos.
