= Caracciolo Parra Olmedo Municipality =

Caracciolo Parra Olmedo Municipality Municipio Caracciolo Parra Olmedo
- Municipality
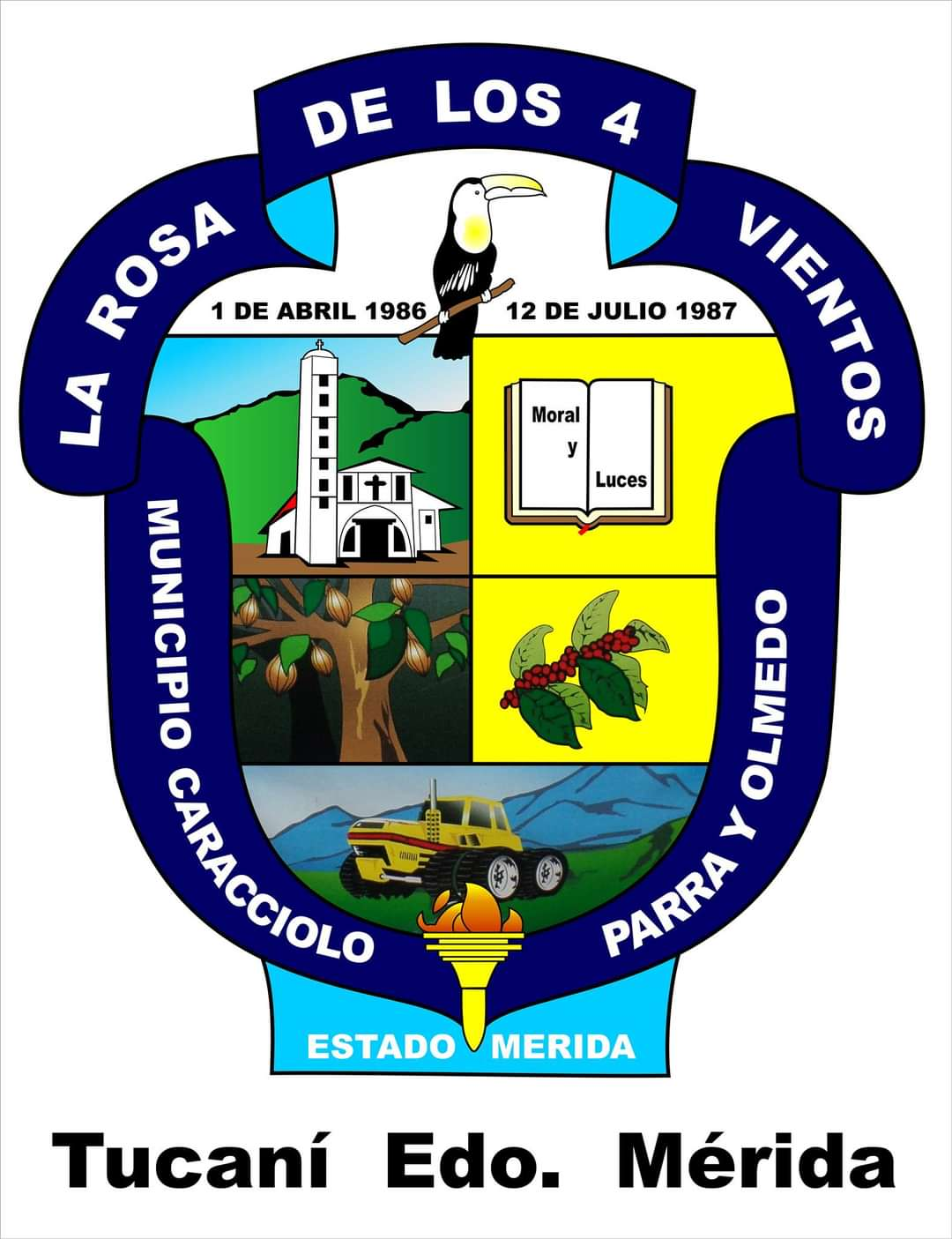
- Flag Coat of arms

- Location in Mérida

- Location in Venezuela
- Coordinates: 8°58′00″N 71°16′23″W
- Country: Venezuela
- State: Mérida

Government
  - Mayor: José Suárez Saavedra (CMC)

Area
  - Total: 689 km^{2} (266 sq mi)

Population (2007)
  - Total: 28,055
  - Density: 40.7/km^{2} (105/sq mi)
- Time zone: UTC−4 (VET)
- Area code(s): 0275
- Website: Official website

The Caracciolo Parra Olmedo Municipality is one of the 23 municipalities (municipios) that makes up the Venezuelan state of Mérida and, according to a 2007 population estimate by the National Institute of Statistics of Venezuela, the municipality has a population of 28,055. The town of Tucaní is the shire town of the Caracciolo Parra Olmedo Municipality.

== Demographics ==
The Caracciolo Parra Olmedo Municipality, according to a 2007 population estimate by the National Institute of Statistics of Venezuela, has a population of 28,055 (up from 23,220 in 2000). This amounts to 3.3% of the state's population. The municipality's population density is 40.7 inhabitants per square kilometre (105/sq mi).

== Government ==
The mayor of the Caracciolo Parra Olmedo Municipality is Yaritza Giorgina Romero de Camacho, re-elected on October 31, 2004, with 50% of the vote. The municipality is divided into two parishes; Capital Caracciolo Parra Olmedo and Florencio Ramírez.

== See also ==
- Tucaní
- Mérida
- Municipalities of Venezuela
