= Cúpira =

- Location within Venezuela
- Coordinates: 10°09′43″N 65°41′59″W
- Country: Venezuela
- State: Miranda
- Municipality: Pedro Gual Municipality
- Founded: 1726
- Time zone: VST
- Climate: Aw

Cúpira is a city in the state of Miranda, Venezuela. It is the capital of Pedro Gual Municipality. Its name may derive from an indigenous word pira, referring to a variety of Amaranth.
