= Almirante Padilla Municipality =

Municipality in Zulia, Venezuela

Almirante Padilla Municipality Municipio Almirante Padilla
- Municipality
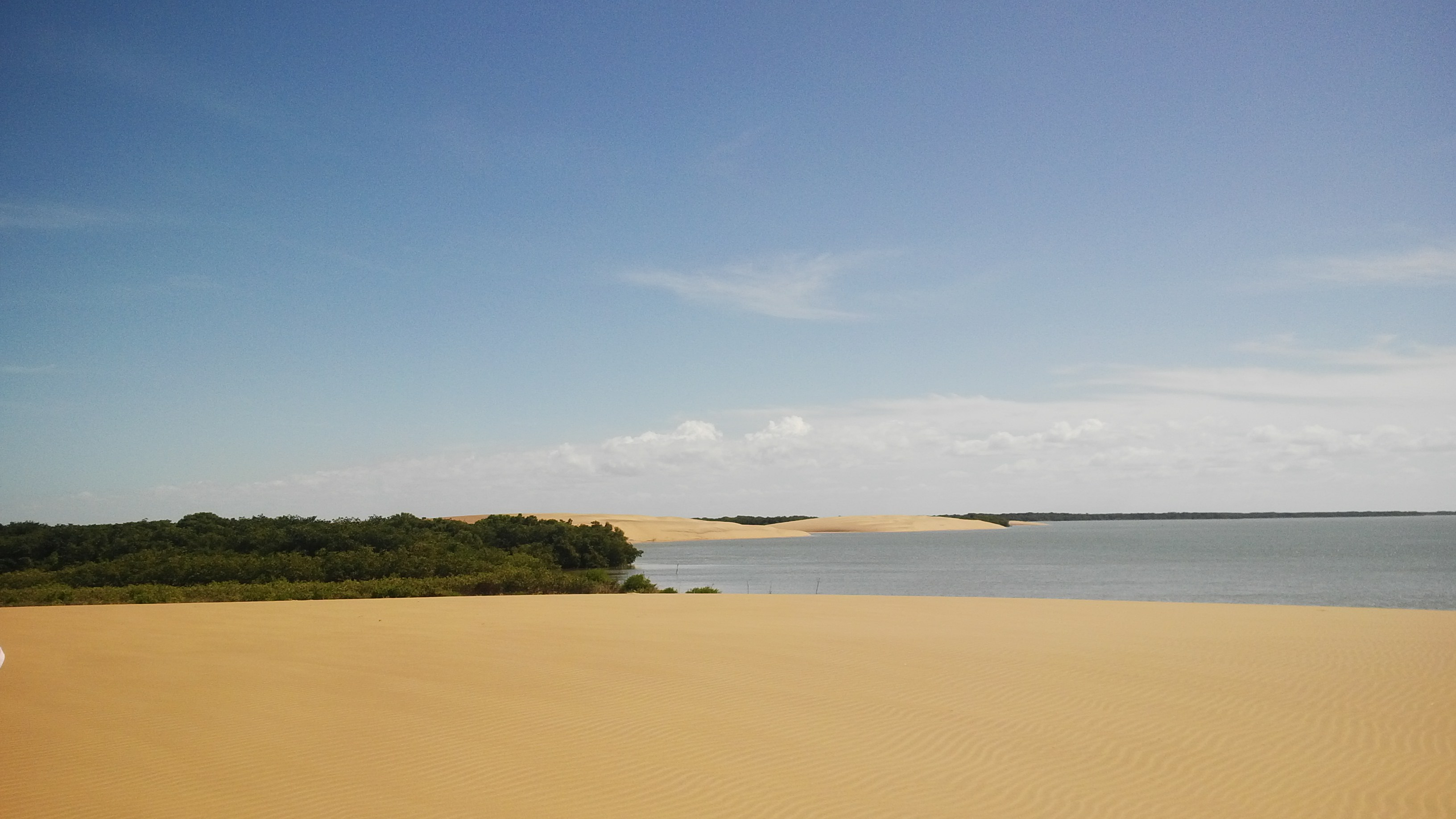

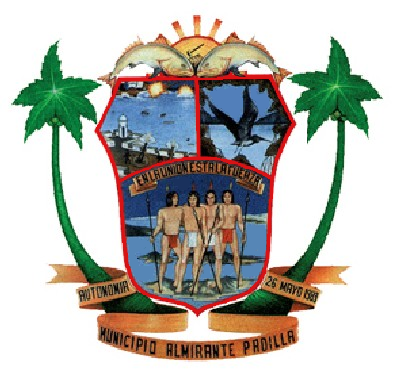
- Flag Seal

- Location in Zulia

- Location in Venezuela
- Country: Venezuela
- State: Zulia
- Municipal seat: El Toro

Government
  - Mayor: Marlon Díaz Delgado (PSUV)

Area
  - Total: 448.8 km^{2} (173.3 sq mi)

Population (2016)
  - Total: 14,256
  - Density: 31.76/km^{2} (82.27/sq mi)
- Time zone: UTC−4 (VET)

Almirante Padilla Municipality is located in Zulia, Venezuela. The municipality has a total surface of 151 km^{2} and it has some 14,256 inhabitant (2016 census). Its capital is El Toro.
