= Santo Domingo, Mérida =

Santo Domingo
- Town
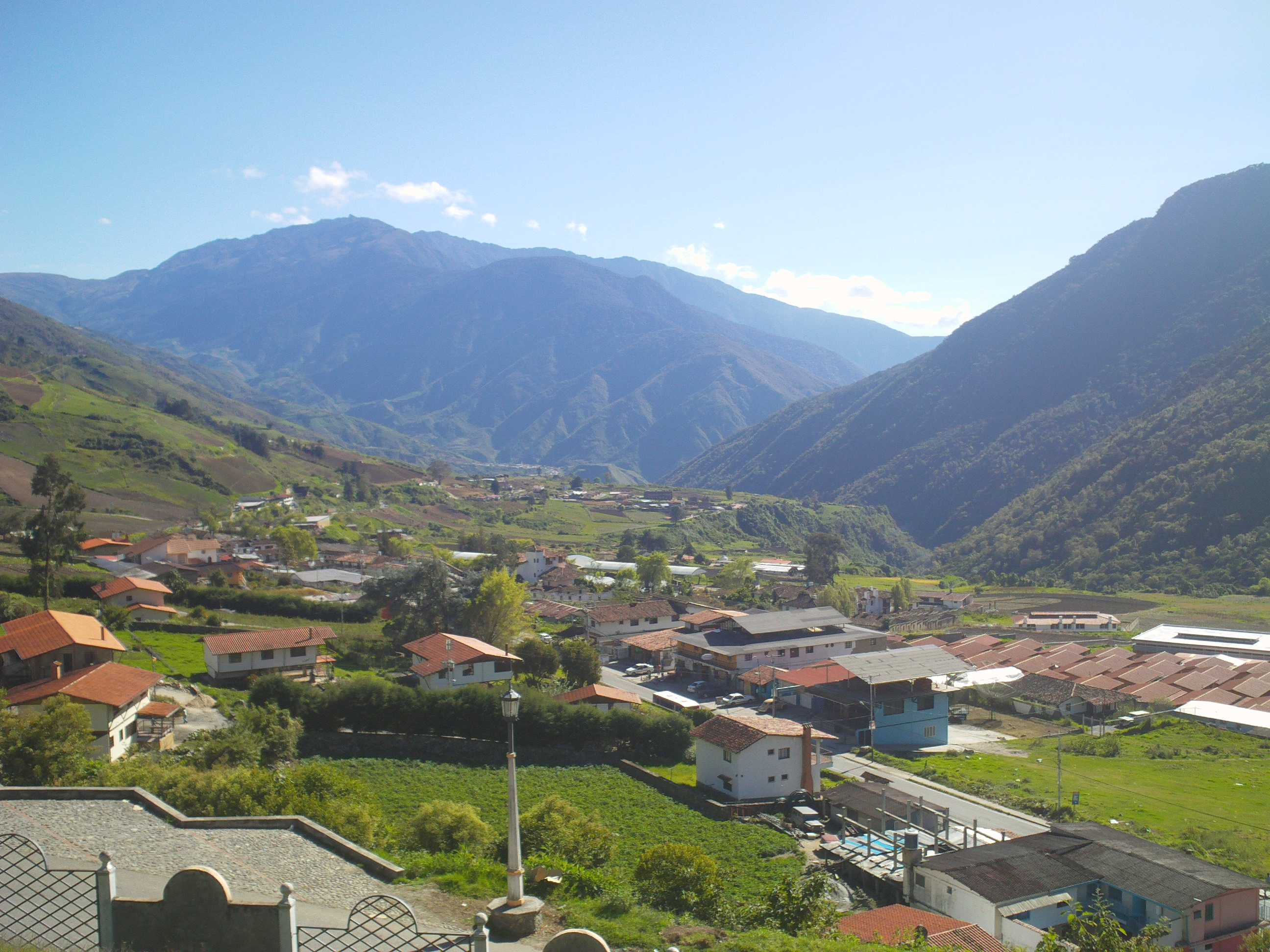

- Location in Venezuela
- Coordinates: 8°51′42″N 70°41′34″W
- Country: Venezuela
- State: Mérida
- Elevation: 2,173 m (7,129 ft)

Population (2011)
  - Total: 4,836
- Time zone: UTC-4:00 (Venezuelan Standard Time (VET))
- Climate: Cwb

Santo Domingo, alternatively known as Santo Domingo del Mérida, is a city in Venezuela, located in Mérida. It is the municipal seat of Cardenal Quintero Municipality.
