= La Plaza de Paraguachí =

- Location within Venezuela
- Coordinates: 11.1076°N 63.8594°W

La Plaza de Paraguachí is a town on Isla Margarita, in the state of Nueva Esparta, Venezuela. It is the capital of the Antolín del Campo Municipality.
