= Tulio Febres Cordero Municipality =

Municipality in Mérida, Venezuela

Tulio Febres Cordero Municipality Municipio Tulio Febres Cordero
- Municipality

- Flag Seal

- Location in Mérida

- Location in Venezuela
- Coordinates: 9°08′30″N 71°05′28″W
- Country: Venezuela
- State: Mérida
- Founded: 1988
- Municipal seat: Nueva Bolivia

Government
  - Mayor: Henry García (COPEI)

Area
  - Total: 787 km^{2} (304 sq mi)

Population (2013)
  - Total: 41,185
  - Density: 52.3/km^{2} (136/sq mi)
- Time zone: UTC−4 (VET)
- Area code(s): 0277

Tulio Febres Cordero Municipality is one of the 23 municipalities that makes up the northern Venezuelan state of Mérida and, according to the 2013 Venezuelean census, the municipality had a population of 41,185. The mayor of the municipality is Henry García of the PSUV party and the town of Nueva Bolivia is the municipal seat of the Tulio Febres Cordero Municipality.

Agriculture is the municipality's main economic activity, with sugarcane and fruits such as plantains, soursop, papaya, guava, and passion fruit being the primary crops. There is also a significant livestock sector dedicated to dual-purpose farming, and several industrial milk processing companies.
