= Pedro Gual Municipality =

Pedro Gual Municipality Municipio Pedro Gual
- Municipality
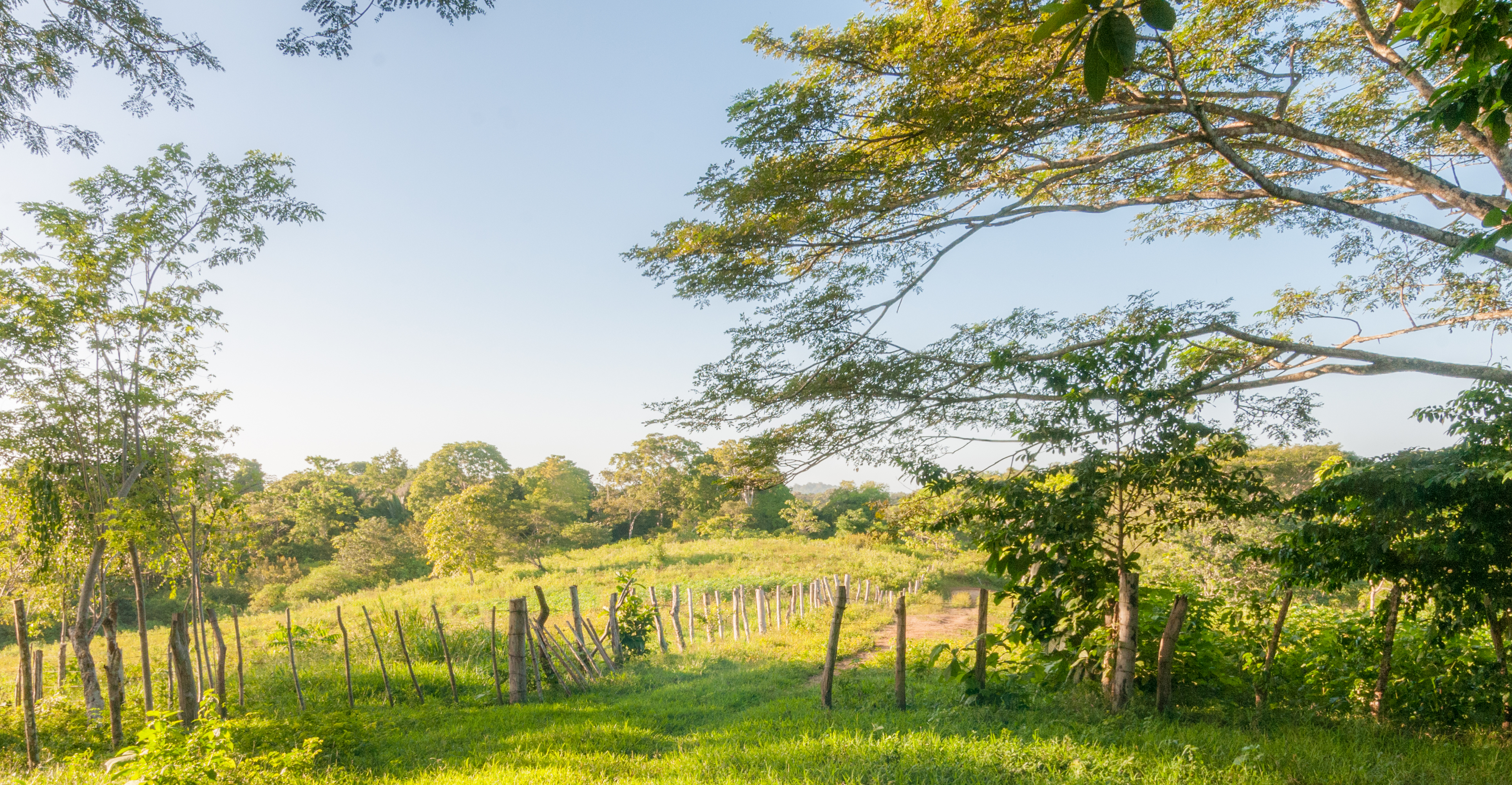

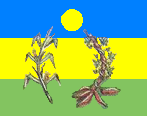
- Flag

- Location in Miranda

- Location in Venezuela
- Coordinates: 10°05′48″N 65°40′40″W
- Country: Venezuela
- State: Miranda
- Municipal seat: Cúpira

Government
  - Mayor: Elbert Vivas López (PSUV)

Area
  - Total: 993.1 km^{2} (383.4 sq mi)

Population (2007)
  - Total: 22,579
  - Density: 22.74/km^{2} (58.89/sq mi)
- Time zone: UTC−4 (VET)
- Area code(s): 0234
- Website: Official website

Pedro Gual is one of the 21 municipalities (municipios) that makes up the Venezuelan state of Miranda and, according to a 2007 population estimate by the National Institute of Statistics of Venezuela, the municipality has a population of 22,579. The town of Cúpira is the municipal seat of the Pedro Gual Municipality. The municipality is named for 19th century Venezuelan President Pedro Gual Escandón.

== Demographics ==
The Pedro Gual Municipality, according to a 2007 population estimate by the National Institute of Statistics of Venezuela, has a population of 22,579 (up from 19,379 in 2000). This amounts to 0.8% of the state's population. The municipality's population density is 24.41 inhabitants per square kilometre (63.2/sq mi).

== Government ==
The mayor of the Pedro Gual Municipality is Manuel Alvarez, elected on October 31, 2004, with 47% of the vote. He replaced Lenis Landaeta shortly after the elections. The municipality is divided into two parishes; Cúpira and Machurucuto.
