= La Quebrada, Venezuela =

Coordinates: 9.1553°N 70.5805°W

La Quebrada
- La Quebrada de San Roque
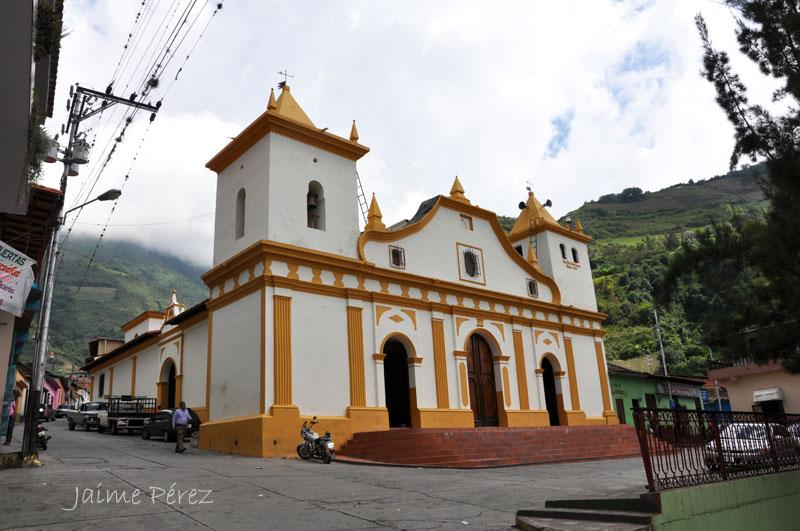
- Interactive map of La Quebrada
- Country: Venezuela
- State: Trujillo
- Municipality: Urdaneta Municipality
- Time zone: VST
- Climate: Af

La Quebrada is the capital of Urdaneta Municipality in the state of Trujillo in Venezuela. The town is also sometimes called La Quebrada de San Roque. It is situated in a mountainous area and has cool weather all year long. In the past, the primary income of the townspeople came from coffee plantations, but today all farming is dedicated to the cultivation of vegetables, fruits and flowers. The houses are built in a Spanish colonial style on laderas or sloped lots.

Visitors come to participate in the series of local religious festivals during the year. The most important feasts are the Patron Saint Feast (The Ascension of Mary and St. Roque) on August 15 and 16, the Holy Week and Christmas festivities which are performed live.
