= Urdaneta Municipality, Trujillo =

Urdaneta Municipality Municipio Urdaneta
- Municipality
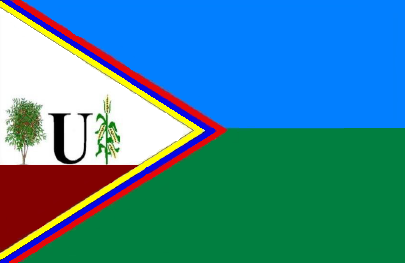
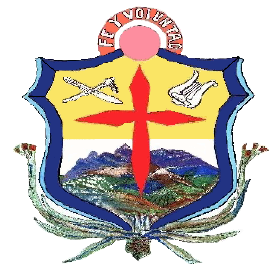
- Flag Coat of arms

- Location in Trujillo

- Location in Venezuela
- Coordinates: 9°9′24″N 70°34′40″W
- Country: Venezuela
- State: Trujillo
- Municipal seat: La Quebrada

Government
  - Mayor: Francisco Vázquez Pacheco (PSUV)

Area
  - Total: 115 km^{2} (44 sq mi)
- Elevation: 332 m (1,089 ft)

Population (2011)
  - Total: 20,162
  - Density: 175/km^{2} (454/sq mi)
- Time zone: UTC−4 (VET)

Urdaneta is one of the 20 municipalities of the state of Trujillo, Venezuela. The municipality occupies an area of 115 km^{2} with a population of 20,162 inhabitants according to the 2011 census.

== Parishes ==
The municipality consists of the following six parishes:

- Cabimbú
- Jajó
- La Mesa de Esnujaque
- Santiago
- Tuñame
- La Quebrada
