= San Rafael del Moján =

- Location within Venezuela
- Coordinates: 10°57′36″N 71°43′57″W
- Time zone: UTC−4 (VET)

San Rafael del Moján is a town in Zulia State in Venezuela. Around 40 km from Maracaibo, it is the shire town of the Mara Municipality.
