= Píritu =

Píritu may refer to a number of Venezuelan localities:

- Píritu, Anzoátegui, town in the Píritu Municipality, Anzoátegui
- Píritu, Falcón, town in the Píritu Municipality, Falcón, in the state of Falcón
- Píritu, Portuguesa, town in the state of Portuguesa
- Puerto Píritu, town in the state of Anzoátegui
- Píritu Islets, two small islands in Anzoátegui
