= Aragua (disambiguation) =

Aragua is a state in Venezuela. It may also refer to:

- Aragua de Maturín, a town in Monagas State
- Aragua River, in Aragua State, Venezuela
- Aragua Municipality, Anzoátegui State, Venezuela
- Aragua de Barcelona, Anzoátegui State, Venezuela
- Aragua Fútbol Club
- Aragua glass frog
- Aragua (moth), a genus of moths
- ARV Aragua (D-31), a Venezuelan ship
- Tren de Aragua, a transnational criminal organization from Venezuela
