= Píritu Municipality =

Píritu Municipality may refer to the following places in Venezuela:

- Píritu Municipality, Anzoátegui
- Píritu Municipality, Falcón, see Falcón State
