= Maite Delgado =

Venezuelan TV host and beauty pageant titleholder (born 1966)

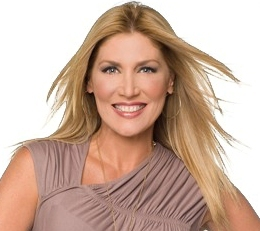
- Born: Maite Coromoto Delgado González; September 20, 1966 (age 60); Valle de Guanape, Anzoátegui, Venezuela
- Occupations: Hostess and Model
- Spouse: Alfonso Mora (m. 1994)
- Relatives: Antonio Mora (brother-in-law)

Maite Coromoto Delgado de Mora (born September 20, 1966) is a Venezuelan tv host and beauty pageant titleholder, best known as the host of the Miss Venezuela pageant from 1997 to 2010. Her eponymously titled show, Maite, aired for four years on the Univision television network in the United States.

Delgado has been referred to as "Venezuela's Oprah", and the country's most popular television host. She was named the Latina celebrity of the year by E! Entertainment Television in 2000.

== Early life ==
Delgado was born on 20 September 1966 in Valle de Guanape, Anzoátegui, Venezuela.

In 1986 she was a contestant in the Miss Venezuela contest, finishing as 2nd runner up. In the same year, she won the title of Miss Tourism International for Venezuela, at a contest in Santo Domingo.

== Television career ==
Her debut as a television presenter was as co-host of the morning show Complicidades on Venevisión. She subsequently appeared on family TV shows such as Circo Cómplice and País de Caramelo, in sitcoms such as ¡Qué Chicas!, and was involved in benefit telethons such as Unidos contra el Cáncer, La Sonrisa de un niño sano (Hospital Ortopédico infantil) and Teleradio Pabellón.

Delgado made her first international appearance presenting Señorita México 1988 in Veracruz, Mexico. From 1992, she presented the morning show Giros TV for four years.

In 1997, she began presenting an eponymous talk show, Maite, making daily broadcasts from the United States, Central America, and South America. She interviewed many high-profile Hispanic celebrities, including Juan Gabriel, Thalía, Ricky Martin, Shakira, Chayanne, Gilberto Santa Rosa, Elvis Crespo, and Ricardo Montaner.

Between 1997 and 2010, she was the presenter of the Miss Venezuela contest. In 2000, E-Entertainment Television named Delgado the "Celebrity of the year". In 2002 she presented Por la Puerta Grande, an interview program with public personalities, broadcast by Univision in the United States. In the same year she also presented ¿Qué dice la gente? ("People Are Saying"), the local version of Family Feud. In 2003 she participated as a guest presenter on the Latin morning show Despierta America on Univision. In June 2003, she received the INTE award as the best Hispanic TV female presenter.

In 2005, Delgado featured in a new TV contest show based on knowledge of Venezuelan culture: Todo por Venezuela. Around the same time, she made the show Te llegó la Suerte for cable channel Telefutura.

In 2009, Delgado presented the Latin Grammy event Celebrando a Juan Gabriel in Las Vegas, honoring the lifetime achievement of Juan Gabriel. In August 2010, she won the QUETZAL Award in Mexico for Venezuelan TV female presenter of the year. Also in 2010, she made her radio debut on Union Radio, presenting short messages related to social conscience and better citizen conduct. In August 2010, the Sunday magazine Estampas selected her as the editor for their 75th-anniversary edition. The issue included an interview with Juan Gabriel in Cancun.

In 2011, she resigned her contract with Venevisión after 25 years. In 2013 she returned to Venevisión.

== Personal life ==
On October 22, 1994, she married tennis player Alfonso Mora. She is the sister-in-law of American television news anchor Antonio Mora.

In 2016 she moved to Aruba.

== See also ==
- List of television presenters/Venezuela
