= Píritu Islets =

Island group in Venezuela

Isletas de Píritu
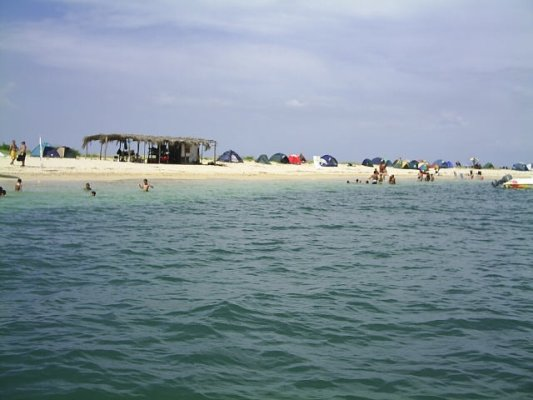
- Píritu Islets
- Interactive map of Isletas de Píritu

Geography
- Location: Caribbean Sea
- Coordinates: 10°09′07″N 64°56′17″W
- Area: 4.65 km^{2} (1.80 sq mi)

Administration
- Venezuela
- State: Anzoátegui

Píritu Islets (Spanish: Isletas de Píritu) are two small islands of the Caribbean, located northwest of Venezuela, in the eastern Anzoátegui state, specifically in the Fernando de Peñalver Municipality north of the town of Puerto Píritu.

== See also ==
- Geography of Venezuela
