= Santa Ana Municipality =

Santa Ana Municipality may refer to:

- Santa Ana Municipality, Beni, Bolivia
- Santa Ana, Magdalena, Colombia
- Santa Ana Municipality, Oaxaca, Mexico
- Santa Ana Municipality, Sonora, Mexico
- Santa Ana Municipality, Anzoátegui, Venezuela
- Santa Ana, Francisco Morazán, Honduras
- Santa Ana Municipality, El Salvador
