= Denzil Romero =

Venezuelan writer (1938–1999)

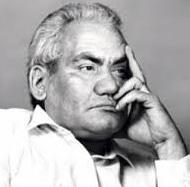
Denzil Romero Portrait

Denzil Romero (July 24, 1938 in Aragua de Barcelona – March 7, 1999 in Valencia), was a Venezuelan writer.

== Career ==
The son of teachers, his love for literature was awakened from a young age:

I never learned to swim, I only raised the occasional parrot and I am the son of schoolteachers, so I can say without bragging that at age 15 I had already read classic Spanish literature. I admit that in my development I was influenced by some writers, of which I'll only name Alejo Carpentier, Carlos Fuentes, Jorge Luis Borges, José Donoso, Juan José Arreola, Reinaldo Arenas, Marcel Proust, William Faulkner ... and from there, Ramos Sucre, Arvelo Torrealba, Enrique Arvelo.

He became a lawyer, and was also a professor of philosophy and literature.

He is considered one of the foremost writers of historical novels in the context of Venezuelan literature. His point of view of the reconstruction of historical fact obeys its own laws of narrative fiction. Some historians and writers, including Luis Alberto Crespo, have defined Denzil Romero's style of referring to his "exaggeration of reality" with a combination of the historical with the esoteric and the erotic with pseudo-realistic.

== Bibliography ==
His work consists of novels, tales, stories and essays:

- El hombre contra el hombre - (English: Man against man) (1977).
- Infundios - (English: Fabrications) (1978, Stories).
- El invencionero - (English: The inventor) (1982, Stories).
- La tragedia del generalísimo - (English: The tragedy of Generalissimo) (1983, Novel).
- Lugar de crónicas - (English: Place of chronicles) (1985).
- Entrego los demonios - (English: I deliver the demons) (1986, Novel).
- Grand Tour - (1987, Novel).
- La esposa del Dr. Thorne - (English: The wife of Dr. Thorne) (1987, Novel).
- Tardía declaración de amor de Seraphine Louis - (English: Belated declaration of love for Seraphine Louis) (1988, Novel).
- La carujada - (English: The outburst) (1990).
- Parece que fue ayer - (English: It seems like only yesterday) (1991).
- El corazón en la mano - (English: Heart in hand) (1993).
- Tonatio Castilán o un tal dios Sol - (English: Tonatio Castilan or just the sun god) (1993).
- Amores, pasiones y vicios de la Gran Catalina - (English: Loves, passions and vices of the Great Catherine) (1995).
- Para seguir el vagavagar - (English: To track the vagavagar) (1998).
- Recurrencia equinoccial - (English: Equinoctial recurrence) (Published in 2002).
- 7 ensayos a medio cribar - (English: 7 screening tests) (2001)

== Prizes ==
- 1983 Casa de las Américas Prize.
- 1999 La Sonrisa Vertical Award for La esposa del Dr. Thorne.
