= San Mateo, Anzoátegui =

Coordinates: 9°44′24″N 64°33′11″W

San Mateo
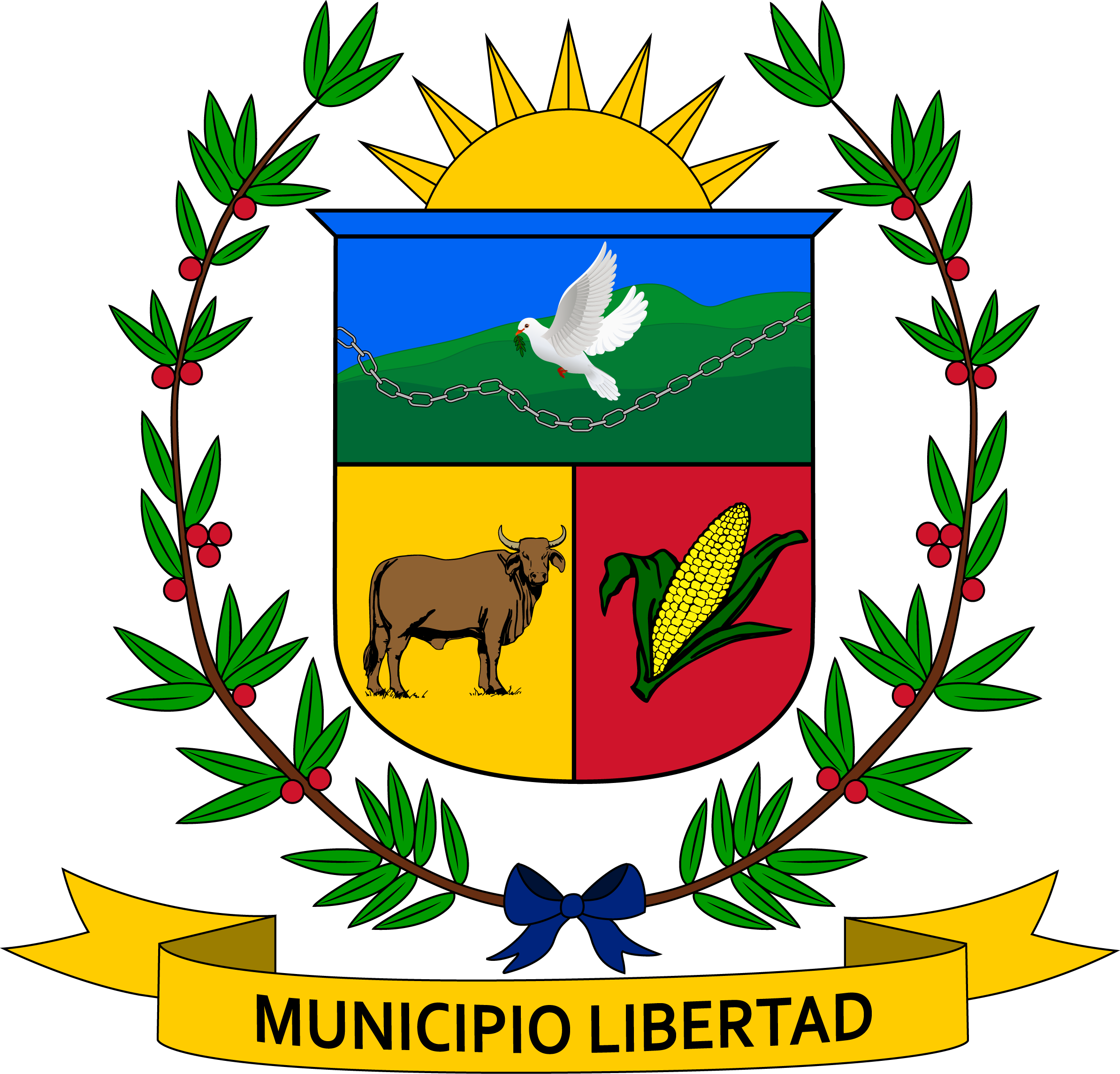
- Flag Coat of arms

- Libertad Municipality in Anzoátegui State
- Country: Venezuela
- State: Anzoátegui
- Municipality: Libertad

Government
  - Mayor: Pablo Cariaco Mejías (PSUV)

Area
  - Total: 2,043 km^{2} (789 sq mi)

Population (2001)
  - Total: 12,905
  - Density: 6.3/km^{2} (16/sq mi)
- Time zone: UTC−4 (VET)
- Area code: 0282
- Climate: Aw
- Website: libertad-anzoategui.gob.ve
- The area and population figures are for the municipality

San Mateo is a town in the eastern Venezuelan Anzoátegui State. This town is the shire town of the Libertad Municipality and, according to the 2001 Venezuelan census, the municipality has a population of 12,905.

== Demographics ==
The Libertad Municipality, according to the 2001 Venezuelan census, has a population of 12,905 (up from 12,617 in 1990). This amounts to 1.1% of Anzoátegui's population.

== Government ==
San Mateo is the shire town of the Libertad Municipality in Anzoátegui. The mayor of the Libertad Municipality is Edgar Celestino Maestre M., elected in 2004 with 57% of the vote. He replaced Juan Carlos Guillent shortly after the last municipal elections in October 2004.
