= Independencia Municipality, Anzoátegui =

Independencia Municipality Municipio Independencia
- Municipality
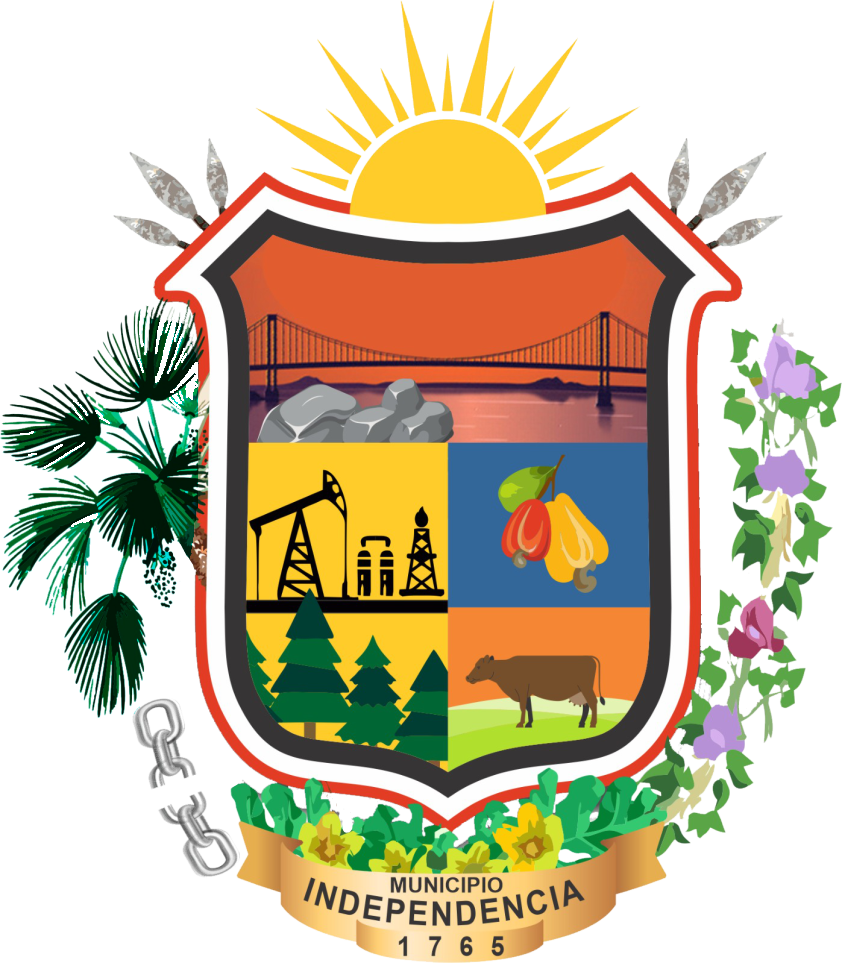
- Flag Coat of arms

- Location in Anzoátegui

- Location in Venezuela
- Coordinates: 8°29′05″N 63°26′41″W
- Country: Venezuela
- State: Anzoátegui

Government
  - Mayor: Hernán Rodríguez Viña (PSUV)

Area
  - Total: 6,693.5 km^{2} (2,584.4 sq mi)

Population (2011)
  - Total: 30,016
  - Density: 4.4844/km^{2} (11.614/sq mi)
- Time zone: UTC−4 (VET)
- Area code(s): 0285
- Website: Official website

The Independencia Municipality is one of the 21 municipalities (municipios) that makes up the eastern Venezuelan state of Anzoátegui and, according to the 2011 census by the National Institute of Statistics of Venezuela, the municipality has a population of 30,016. The town of Soledad is the shire town of the Independencia Municipality.

== Demographics ==
The Independencia Municipality, according to a 2007 population estimate by the National Institute of Statistics of Venezuela, has a population of 31,399 (up from 28,287 in 2000). This amounts to 2.1% of the state's population. The municipality's population density is 5.3 inhabitants per square kilometre (14/sq mi).

== Government ==
The mayor of the Independencia Municipality is Carlos Vidal, elected on 23 November 2008 with 55% of the vote. He replaced Humberto Bello shortly after the elections. The municipality is divided into two parishes; Capital Independencia and Mamo.

== See also ==
- Soledad
- Anzoátegui
- Municipalities of Venezuela
