= Flag of Anzoátegui =

- Flag of Anzoátegui State
- Design: Blue, yellow and green stripes with outline of the state of Anzoátegui
- Designed by: Lemarys del Valle Rincones

The Flag of the Anzoátegui State is the official regional or state flag of Anzoátegui in Venezuela. The design was released on May 19, 1999, and was officially established by Decree No. 138 on June 16, 1999.

== Design ==
The design of the flag of Anzoátegui is composed of three horizontal stripes of equal size:

- one light blue to represent the skies, seas and rivers.
- one yellow to symbolize the warmth of the climate and its inhabitants
- one green for all the riches of our nature.

In the center of the three strips is inserted a silhouette with the shape of the state Anzoátegui, in black frame, that symbolizes the petroleum riches of the subsoil.

Color scheme
Color	Denomination		Code
Light blue	Wed	HEX	#007FFFFF
Light blue	Wed	RGB	0,127,255
Yellow	Wed	HEX	#FFCC00FF
Yellow	Wed	RGB	255,204,0
Green	Wed	HEX	#008033FF
Green	Wed	RGB	0,128,51
Black	Wed	HEX	#000000FF
Black	Wed	RGB	0,0,0

== History ==
It was the product of a competition organized expressly to conceive it on the initiative of the historian Maximilian Kopp Marcano and carried out by the Directorate of Culture of the State, under the direction of Enrique Hidalgo on February 25, 1999. The Jury, also composed of other renowned Representatives of the region, considered 152 projects being unanimously winner of the one made by Lemarys Del Valle Rincones, native of Puerto la Cruz. The definitive verdict of the contest was published on 19 May 1999 and the flag of the Anzoátegui State was officially established by Decree No. 138 signed by Alexis Rosas, Governor of the State (1998-2000) on 16 June 1999.
