= Libertad Municipality, Anzoátegui =

Libertad Municipality Municipio Libertad
- Municipality
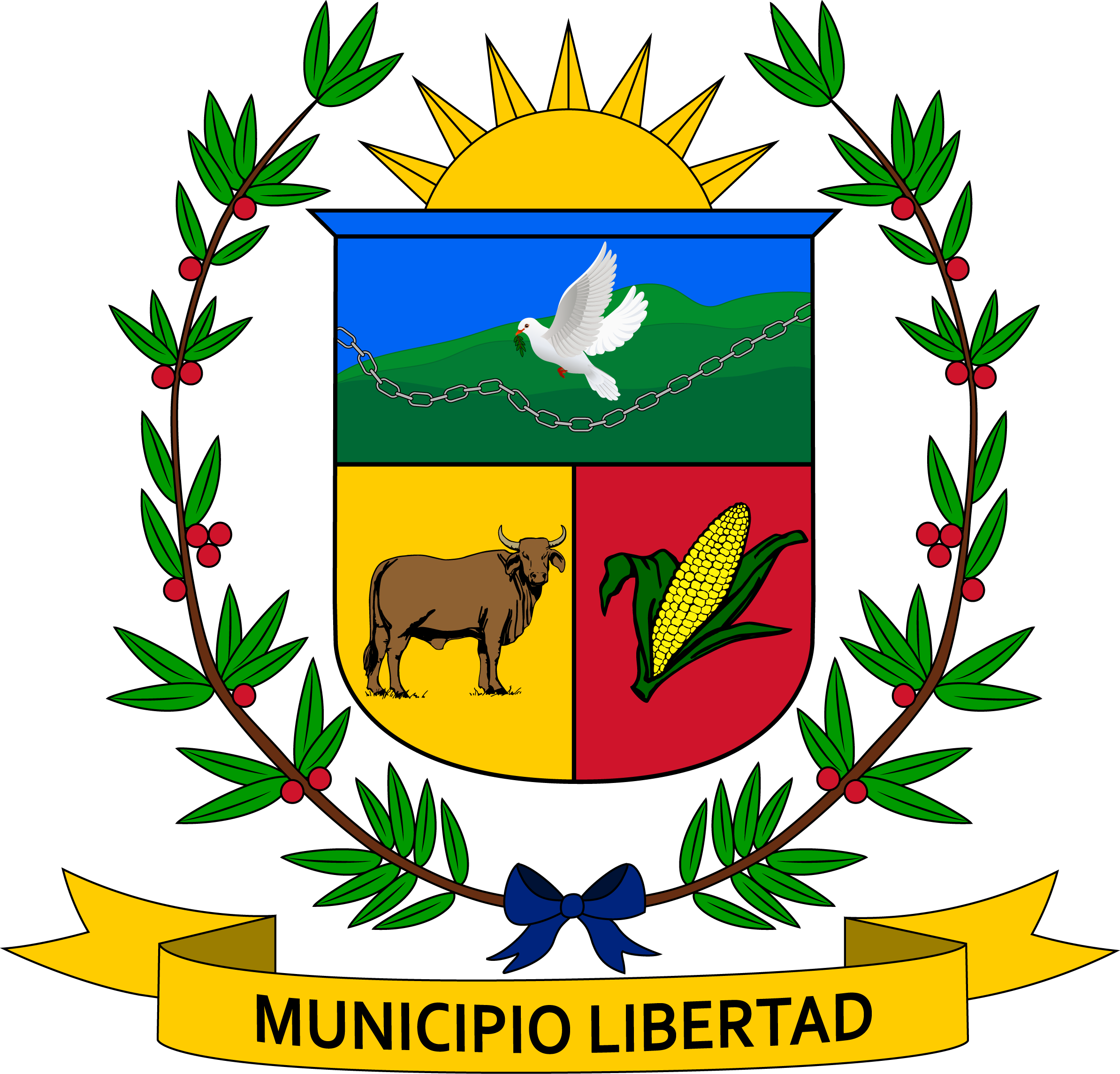
- Flag Coat of arms

- Location in Anzoátegui

- Location in Venezuela
- Coordinates: 9°45′48″N 64°30′52″W
- Country: Venezuela
- State: Anzoátegui

Government
  - Mayor: Pablo Cariaco Mejías (PSUV)

Area
  - Total: 2,062.8 km^{2} (796.5 sq mi)

Population (2011)
  - Total: 14,437
  - Density: 6.9987/km^{2} (18.127/sq mi)
- Time zone: UTC−4 (VET)
- Area code(s): 0282
- Website: Official website

The Libertad Municipality is one of the 21 municipalities (municipios) that makes up the eastern Venezuelan state of Anzoátegui and, according to the 2011 census by the National Institute of Statistics of Venezuela, the municipality has a population of 14,437. The town of San Mateo is the shire town of the Libertad Municipality.

== Demographics ==
The Libertad Municipality, according to a 2007 population estimate by the National Institute of Statistics of Venezuela, has a population of 14,720 (up from 13,597 in 2000). This amounts to 1% of the state's population. The municipality's population density is 7.2 inhabitants per square kilometre (19/sq mi).

== Government ==
The mayor of the Libertad Municipality is Edgar Celestino Maestre M., re-elected November 23, 2008 with 58% of the vote. The municipality is divided into three parishes; Capital Libertad, El Carito, and Santa Inés.

== See also ==
- San Mateo
- Anzoátegui
- Municipalities of Venezuela
