= Sir Arthur McGregor Municipality =

Sir Arthur McGregor Municipality Municipio Sir Arthur McGregor
- Municipality
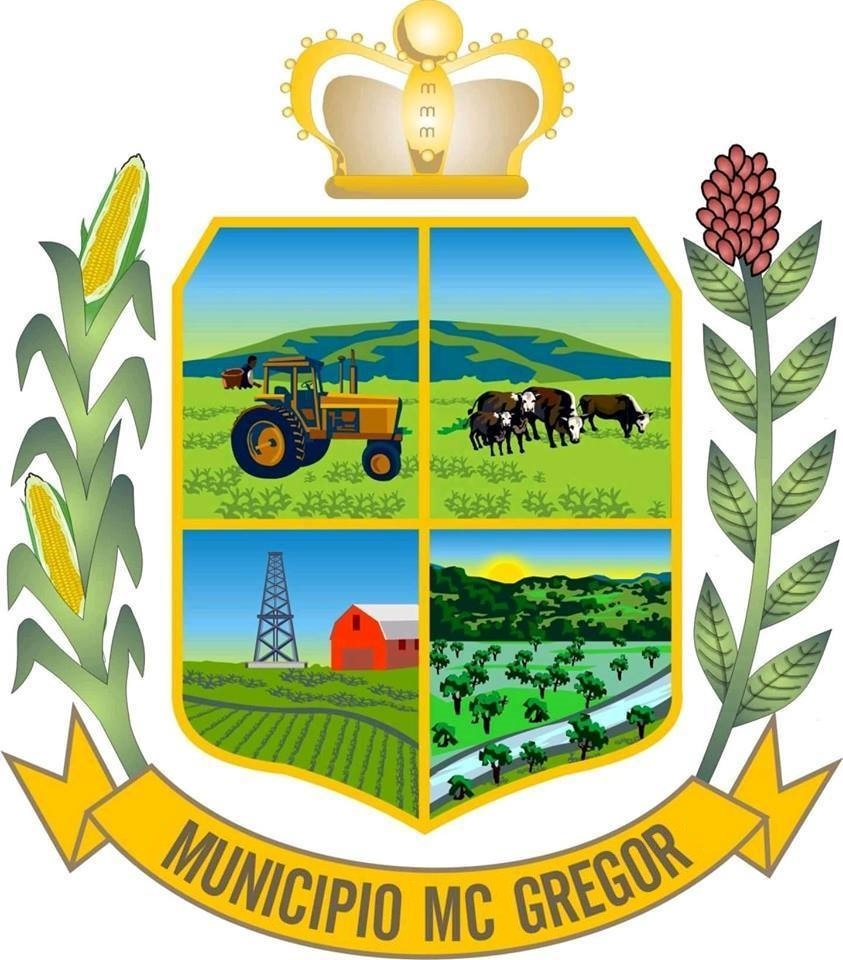
- Flag Coat of arms

- Location in Anzoátegui

- Location in Venezuela
- Coordinates: 9°11′30″N 65°00′27″W
- Country: Venezuela
- State: Anzoátegui
- Municipal seat: El Chaparro[*]

Government
  - Mayor: Lisandro Marcano Marcano (PSUV)

Area
  - Total: 1,350.4 km^{2} (521.4 sq mi)

Population (2011)
  - Total: 9,768
  - Density: 7.233/km^{2} (18.73/sq mi)
- Time zone: UTC−4 (VET)
- Area code(s): 0283
- Website: Official website

The Sir Arthur McGregor Municipality is one of the 21 municipalities (municipios) that make up the eastern Venezuelan state of Anzoátegui, and according to the 2011 census by the National Institute of Statistics of Venezuela, the municipality has a population of 9,768. The town of El Chaparro is the shire town of the Sir Arthur McGregor Municipality.

== Demographics ==
The Sir Arthur McGregor Municipality, according to a 2007 population estimate by the National Institute of Statistics of Venezuela, has a population of 9,434 (up from 8,590 in 2000). This amounts to 0.6% of the state's population. The municipality's population density is 8.46 inhabitants per square kilometre (21.9/sq mi).

== Geography ==
Sir Arthur McGregor Municipality is located in the central‑western portion of Anzoátegui State in eastern Venezuela and is one of the state’s 21 municipalities.

For administrative purposes, it is divided into two parishes: El Chaparro, which functions as the municipal seat and principal settlement, and Tomás Alfaro Calatrava. The municipality is bordered to the north by Cajigal Municipality, to the south by Miranda Municipality, to the east by Aragua Municipality, and to the west by the adjacent state of Guárico.

== Government ==
The mayor of the Sir Arthur McGregor Municipality is María Agustina Rondón de Salazar, re-elected November 23, 2008, with 66% of the vote. The municipality is divided into two parishes; El Chaparral and Tomás Alfaro Calatrava.

== See also ==
- El Chaparro
- Anzoátegui
- Municipalities of Venezuela
