= San Juan de Capistrano Municipality =

San Juan de Capistrano Municipality Municipio San Juan de Capistrano
- Municipality
- Flag Coat of arms

- Location in Anzoátegui

- Location in Venezuela
- Coordinates: 10°05′04″N 65°24′49″W
- Country: Venezuela
- State: Anzoátegui

Government
  - Mayor: Alexander Naser Nasr (PSUV)

Area
  - Total: 132.1 km^{2} (51.0 sq mi)

Population (2011)
  - Total: 9,047
  - Density: 68.49/km^{2} (177.4/sq mi)
- Time zone: UTC−4 (VET)
- Area code(s): 0281
- Website: Official website

The San Juan de Capistrano Municipality is one of the 21 municipalities (municipios) that makes up the eastern Venezuelan state of Anzoátegui and, according to the 2011 census by the National Institute of Statistics of Venezuela, the municipality has a population of 9,047. The town of Boca de Uchire is the shire town of the San Juan de Capistrano Municipality.

== Demographics ==
The San Juan de Capistrano Municipality, according to a 2007 population estimate by the National Institute of Statistics of Venezuela, has a population of 8,975 (up from 7,998 in 2000). This amounts to 0.6% of the state's population. The municipality's population density is 72.97 inhabitants per square kilometre (189.0/sq mi).

== Government ==
The mayor of the San Juan de Capistrano Municipality is Asdrubal Mendez, elected on November 23, 2008, with 36% of the vote. He replaced José Ángel Bellorín shortly after the elections. The municipality is divided into two parishes; Capital Boca de Uchire and Boca de Chávez .

== See also ==
- Boca de Uchire
- Anzoátegui
- Municipalities of Venezuela
