= Santa Ana Municipality, Anzoátegui =

Santa Ana Municipality Municipio Santa Ana
- Municipality
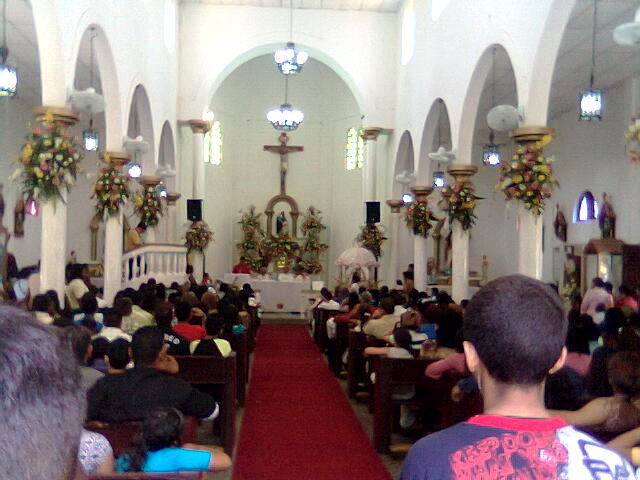
- Church in Santa Ana Municipality

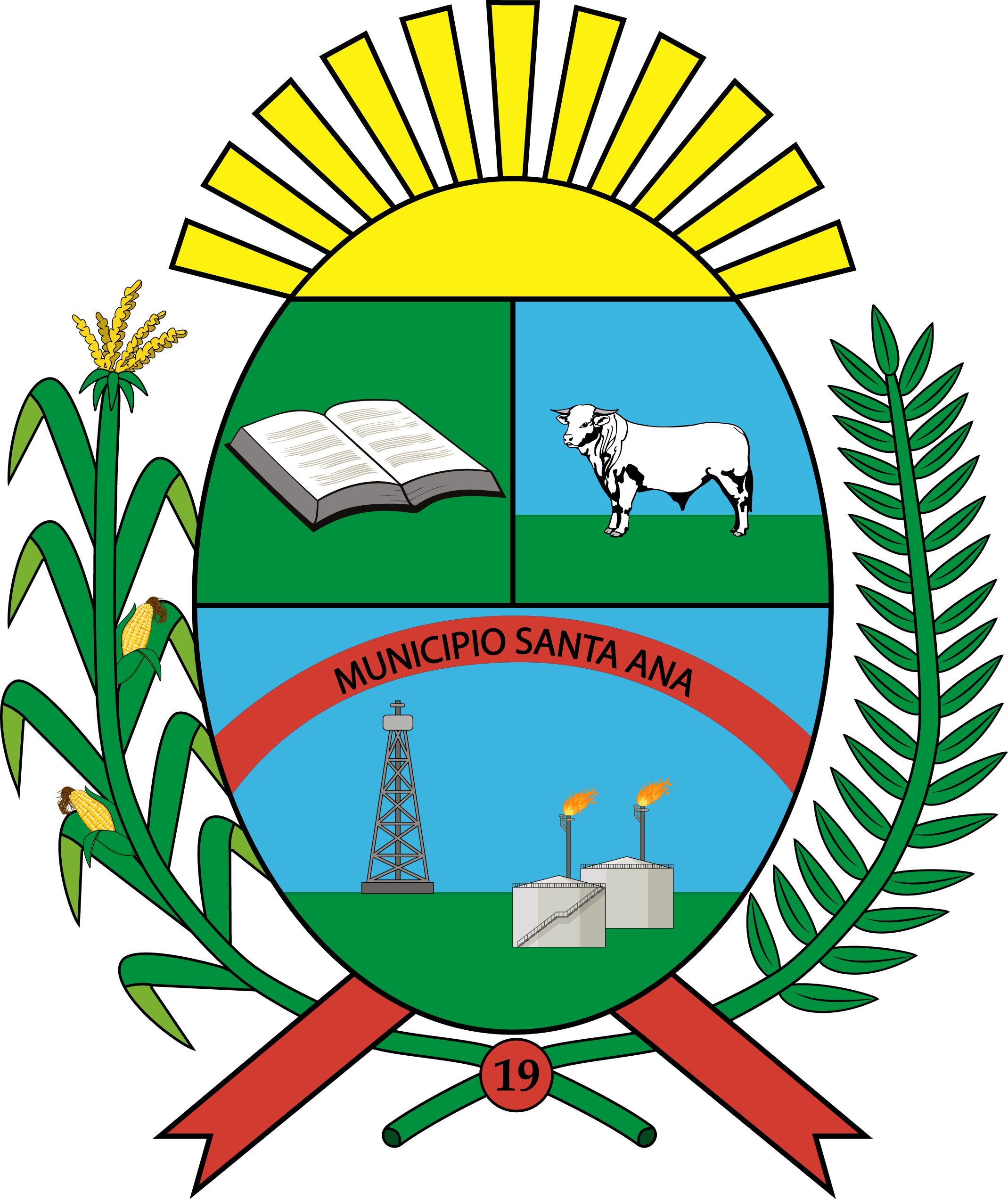
- Flag Coat of arms

- Location in Anzoátegui

- Location in Venezuela
- Coordinates: 9°14′40″N 64°38′07″W
- Country: Venezuela
- State: Anzoátegui

Government
  - Mayor: Freddy Fernández Bernay (PSUV)

Area
  - Total: 783.1 km^{2} (302.4 sq mi)

Population (2011)
  - Total: 9,636
  - Density: 12.30/km^{2} (31.87/sq mi)
- Time zone: UTC−4 (VET)
- Area code(s): 0282
- Website: Official website

The Santa Ana Municipality is one of the 21 municipalities (municipios) that makes up the eastern Venezuelan Anzoátegui State and, according to the 2011 census by the National Institute of Statistics of Venezuela, the municipality has a population of 9,636. The town of Santa Ana is the shire town of the Santa Ana Municipality.

== Demographics ==
The Santa Ana Municipality, according to a 2007 population estimate by the National Institute of Statistics of Venezuela, has a population of 10,919 (up from 9,675 in 2000). This amounts to 0.7% of the state's population. The municipality's population density is 9.22 inhabitants per square kilometre (23.9/sq mi).

== Government ==
The mayor of the Santa Ana Municipality is Gerson Martínez, re-elected November 23, 2008 with 49% of the vote. The municipality is divided into two parishes; Capital Santa Ana and Pueblo Nuevo.

== See also ==
- Santa Ana
- Anzoátegui
- Municipalities of Venezuela
