= Aragua de Barcelona =

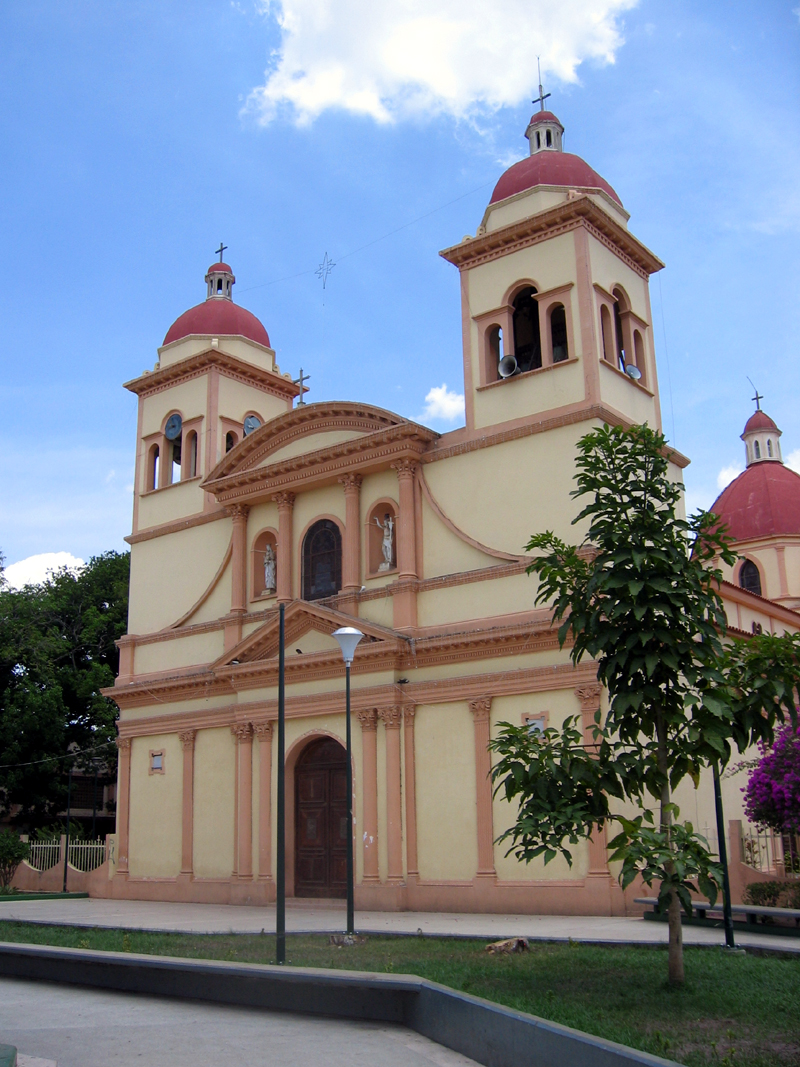

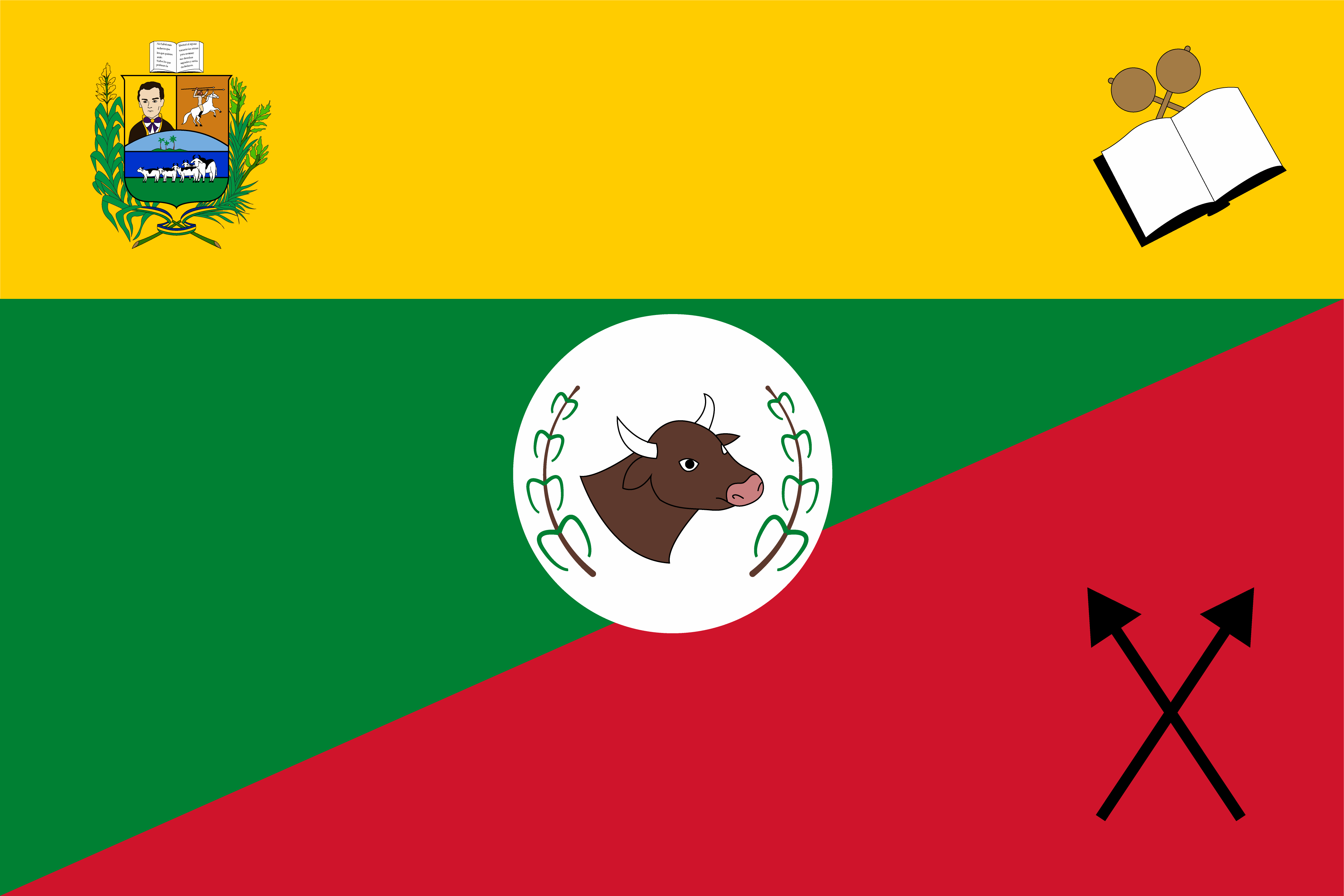
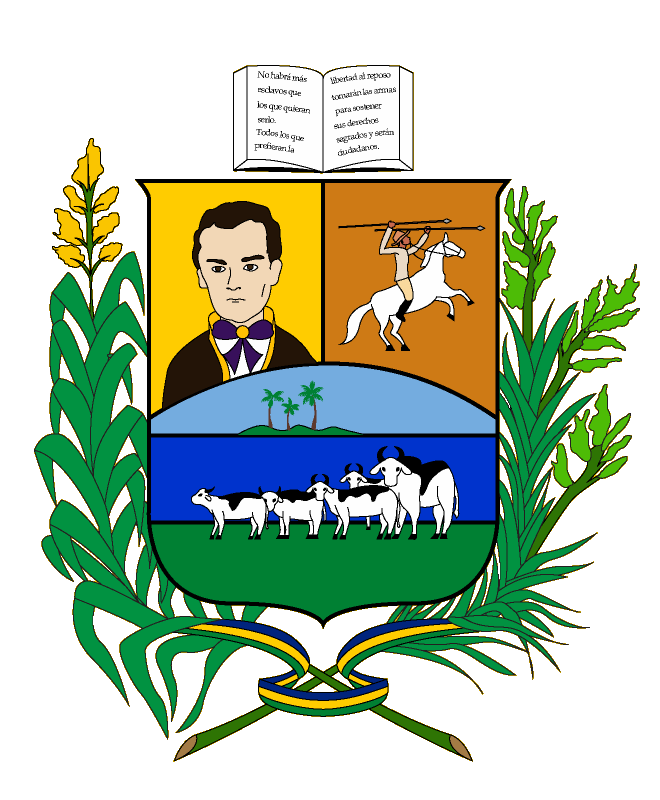
- Flag Coat of arms

- Location within Venezuela
- Coordinates: 9°27′27″N 64°49′34″W
- Country: Venezuela
- State: Anzoátegui
- Municipality: Aragua Municipality
- Founded: 1735

Area
  - Total: 67 km^{2} (26 sq mi)
- Elevation: 104 m (341 ft)

Population (2001)
  - Total: 27,000 (Aragua Municipality)
  - Demonym: Aragüeño/a
- Time zone: UTC−4 (VET)
- Postal code: 6002
- Area code: 0280
- Climate: Aw
- Website: Municipal website

Aragua de Barcelona (Spanish pronunciation: [aˈɾaɣwa ðe βaɾseˈlona]) is the shire town of Aragua Municipality in Anzoátegui State in Venezuela.

== Notable people ==
- Denzil Romero (1938–1999), Venezuelan writer
