= Aragua Municipality =

Aragua Municipality Municipio Aragua
- Municipality
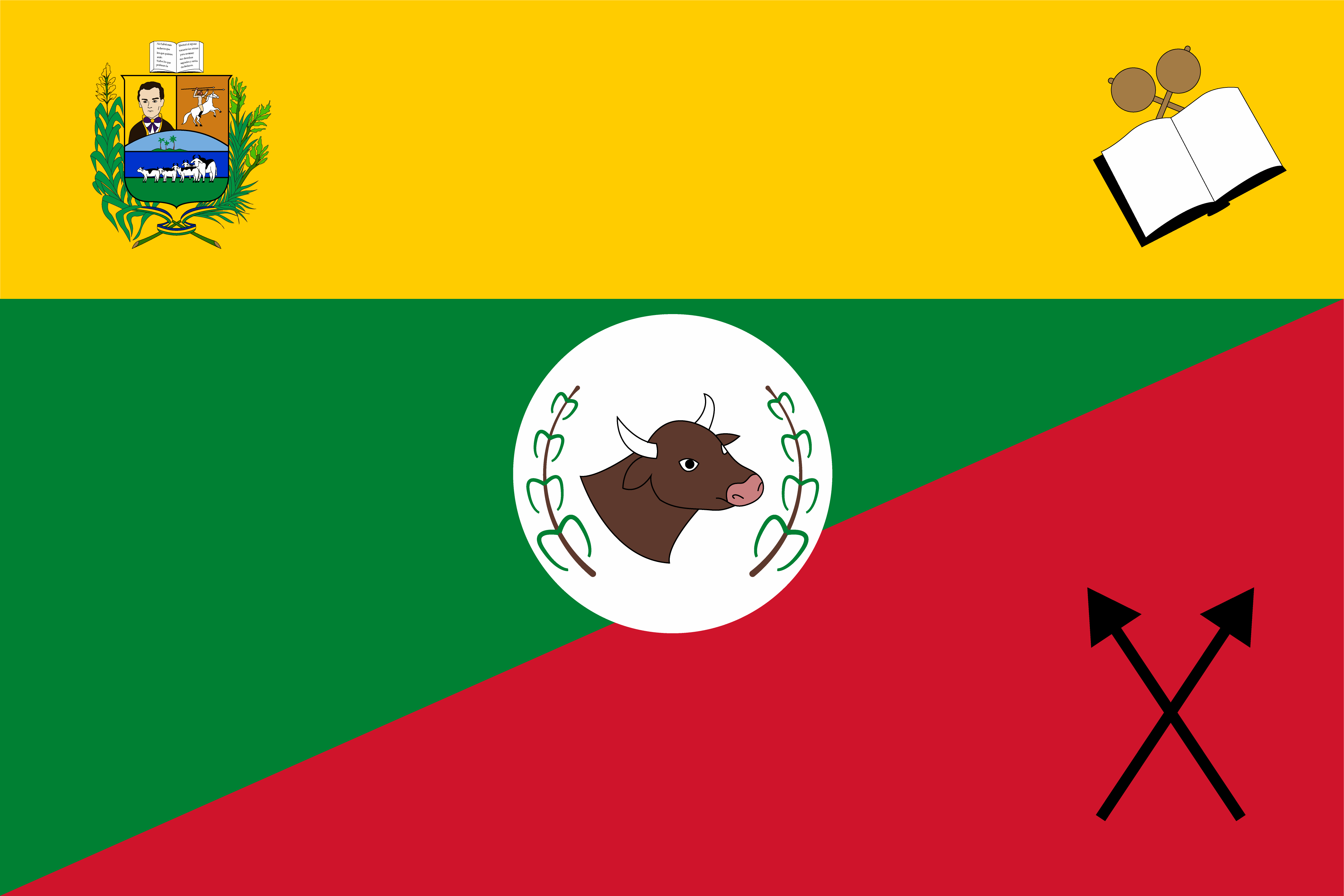
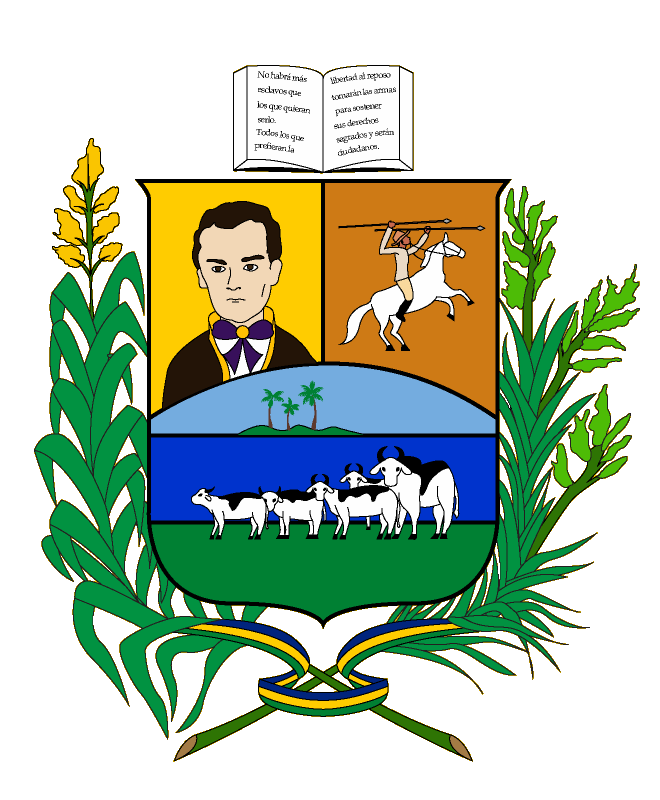
- Flag Coat of arms

- Location in Anzoátegui

- Location in Venezuela
- Coordinates: 9°21′01″N 64°52′27″W
- Country: Venezuela
- State: Anzoátegui

Government
  - Mayor: Cruz de Los Angeles Torrealba (PSUV)

Area
  - Total: 3,052.9 km^{2} (1,178.7 sq mi)

Population (2011)
  - Total: 29,268
  - Density: 9.5870/km^{2} (24.830/sq mi)
- Time zone: UTC−4 (VET)
- Area code(s): 0282
- Website: Official website

The Aragua Municipality is one of the 21 municipalities (municipios) that makes up the eastern Venezuelan state of Anzoátegui and, according to the 2011 census by the National Institute of Statistics of Venezuela, the municipality has a population of 29,268. The town of Aragua de Barcelona is the shire town of the Aragua Municipality.

== Demographics ==
The Aragua Municipality, according to a 2007 population estimate by the National Institute of Statistics of Venezuela, has a population of 32,558 (up from 28,723 in 2000). This amounts to 2.2% of the state's population. The municipality's population density is 12.41 inhabitants per square kilometre (32.1/sq mi).

== Government ==
The mayor of the Aragua Municipality is Juan de Dios Figueredo, re-elected on 23 November 2008 with 52% of the vote. The municipality is divided into two parishes; Capital Aragua and Cachipo.

== See also ==
- Anzoátegui
- Municipalities of Venezuela
