= Píritu Municipality, Anzoátegui =

Píritu Municipality Municipio Píritu
- Municipality
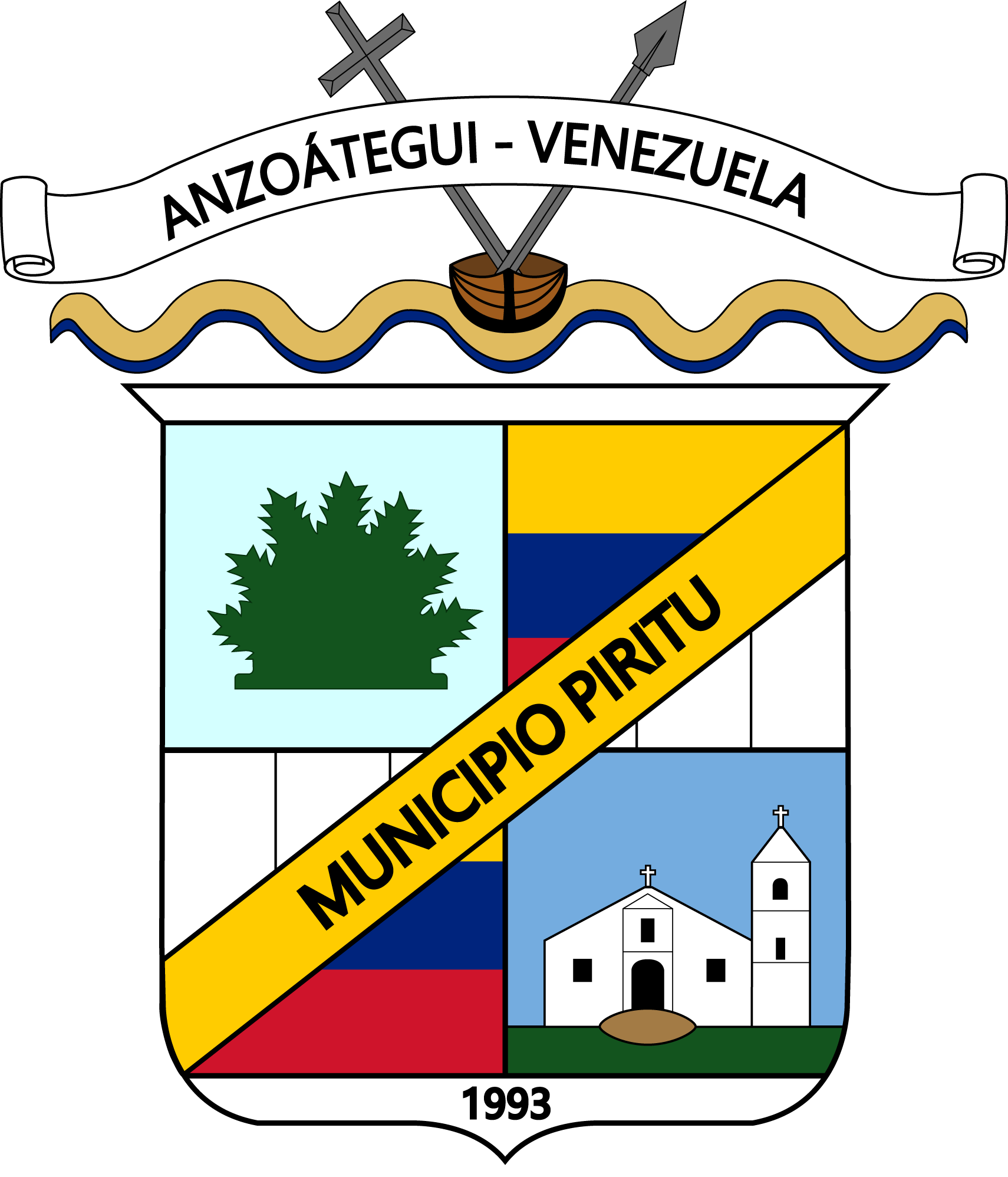
- Flag Coat of arms

- Location in Anzoátegui

- Location in Venezuela
- Coordinates: 9°55′04″N 65°03′53″W
- Country: Venezuela
- State: Anzoátegui
- Municipal seat: Píritu[*]

Government
  - Mayor: Lucia Cordova Zerpa (PSUV)

Area
  - Total: 263.0 km^{2} (101.5 sq mi)

Population (2011)
  - Total: 23,248
  - Density: 88.40/km^{2} (228.9/sq mi)
- Time zone: UTC−4 (VET)
- Area code(s): 0281

The Píritu Municipality is one of the 21 municipalities (municipios) that makes up the eastern Venezuelan state of Anzoátegui and, according to the 2011 census by the National Institute of Statistics of Venezuela, the municipality has a population of 23,248. The town of Píritu, Anzoátegui is the shire town of the Píritu Municipality.

== History ==
The Píritu Municipality separated in 1993 from the Fernando de Peñalver Municipality.

== Demographics ==
The Píritu Municipality, according to a 2007 population estimate by the National Institute of Statistics of Venezuela, has a population of 24,532 (up from 19,834 in 2000). This amounts to 1.7% of the state's population. The municipality's population density is 109.03 inhabitants per square kilometre (282.4/sq mi).

== Government ==
The mayor of the Píritu Municipality is Rita Jimenez, elected on November 23, 2008, with 47% of the vote. She replaced Antonio Barrios shortly after the elections. The municipality is divided into two parishes; Capital Píritu and San Francisco (previous to June 27, 1995, the Píritu Municipality contained only a single parish) .

== See also ==
- Municipalities of Venezuela
