= Aragua (moth) =

Scientific classification
- Kingdom: Animalia
- Phylum: Arthropoda
- Class: Insecta
- Order: Lepidoptera
- Family: Geometridae
- Tribe: Nacophorini
- Genus: Aragua; Rindge, 1983

Genus of geometer moths

Aragua is a monotypic genus of moths in the family Geometridae, containing the species Aragua bistonaria Snellen, 1874.
