= Puerto Píritu =

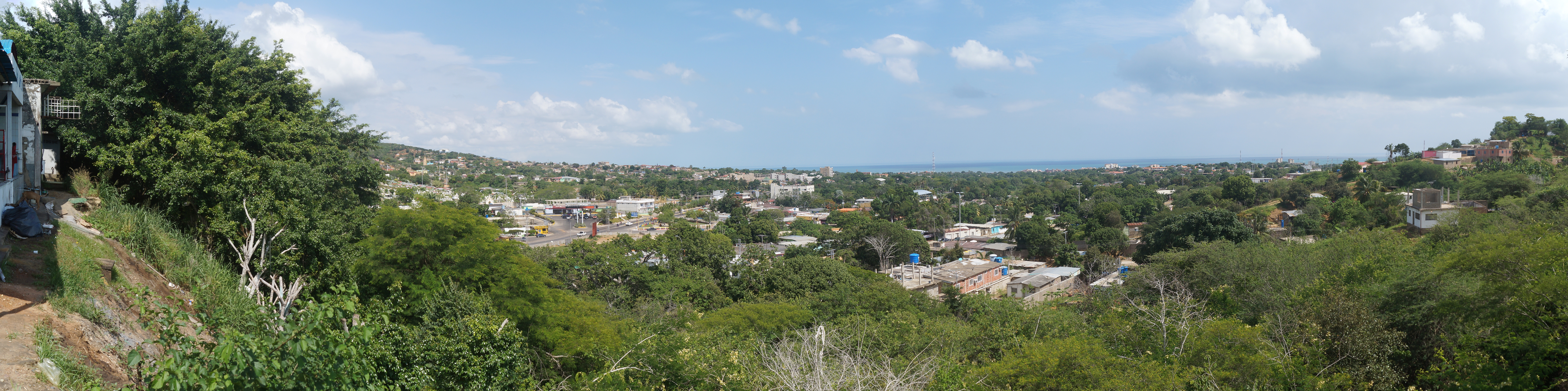

- Flag Coat of arms
- Nickname: Enchanted land
- Location within Venezuela
- Coordinates: 10°04′N 65°03′W
- Country: Venezuela
- States: Anzoátegui
- Municipalities: Fernando de Peñalver Municipality
- Founded: 1513

Government
  - Mayor: Jannette Calista Adames (PSUV)
- Elevation: 8 m (26 ft)

Population (2001)
  - Total: 11,000 approx.
  - Demonym: portopiriteño(a)
- Time zone: UTC−4 (VET)
- Postal code: 6022
- Area code: 281
- Climate: BSh
- Website: (in Spanish)

Puerto Píritu is a Venezuelan city located in the north-central coast of Anzoátegui State, with a population more than 11,000. It is the capital of the Fernando de Peñalver Municipality, and located 46 km from the centre of Barcelona, the capital of the State. By road it is approximately 25 minutes from the city of Barcelona and 45 minutes from Uchire Boca.

== History ==
Puerto Píritu founded in 1513 as "El Manjar" and abandoned few years later, still retains an enormous amount of colonial buildings in the historic centre of the city. Modern history starts from the arrival of Franciscan missionaries in 1652. Puerto Píritu was the point of entry and departure in the 17th and 18th centuries for colonization, evangelization and immigration into what is now Anzoátegui State. Puerto Píritu began its history with its own identity in the mid-19th century. Thanks to many margariteñas families, that people became the major commercial port output products of the guariqueños Plains and in the basin of river Unare point such that for 1928 was already district as it is today the municipality Peñalver.

The current Puerto Píritu still retains an enormous amount of colonial buildings in the historic centre of the city.

== Economy ==
Tourism and fishing and trade are the main sources of income of Puerto Píritu.

== Geography ==
The altitude of the city is eight m.

The city is located in a 10.04495 'n LAT and Long 65.033272 ' o.

=== Climate ===
Puerto Píritu has a hot semi-arid climate (Köppen BSh).

Climate data for Puerto Píritu, Venezuela
Month	Jan	Feb	Mar	Apr	May	Jun	Jul	Aug	Sep	Oct	Nov	Dec	Year
Mean daily maximum °C (°F)	31.1 (88.0)	31.7 (89.1)	32.2 (90.0)	32.2 (90.0)	32.8 (91.0)	31.7 (89.1)	31.7 (89.1)	31.7 (89.1)	32.2 (90.0)	32.8 (91.0)	32.2 (90.0)	31.7 (89.1)	32.0 (89.6)
Mean daily minimum °C (°F)	20.0 (68.0)	20.6 (69.1)	21.7 (71.1)	22.8 (73.0)	23.3 (73.9)	22.8 (73.0)	22.8 (73.0)	22.8 (73.0)	22.8 (73.0)	22.8 (73.0)	22.2 (72.0)	21.1 (70.0)	22.1 (71.8)
Average rainfall mm (inches)	7.6 (0.30)	2.5 (0.10)	2.5 (0.10)	7.6 (0.30)	48.3 (1.90)	104.1 (4.10)	119.4 (4.70)	121.9 (4.80)	83.8 (3.30)	58.4 (2.30)	43.2 (1.70)	22.9 (0.90)	622.2 (24.5)
Source: [The Weather Channel Interactive, Inc.]

== Tourism ==
Port Píritu is a tourist area as well as the other cities of Anzoátegui State, with its beaches and lagoons. This region is characterized by a sparse vegetation in contrast to large areas of beaches that are mostly frequented by domestic visitors.

The eastern seaboard of Anzoátegui has a tourist infrastructure of recent data, the resort of Puerto Píritu has a length of 600 meters of beaches in turbid waters that turn brown when the sea is rough. Services include restaurants type "caneys", rent sunshades and umbrellas. Port Píritu's tourist attractions include its scenery, flora, fauna and beaches.

== Schools ==
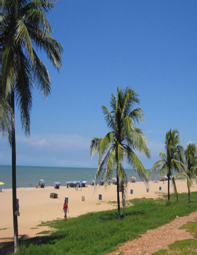
Beach of Puerto Píritu. Main source of tourism

- EU Pedro Rolingson Herrera
- U.E.P mother Candelaria
- U.E.P educational Institute Puerto Píritu
- EU Francisco Fajardo
- U.E.P. Edgar Marques
- U.E.P. Christ Jose
- EU José f. laya
- EU Pedro Celestino Muñóz
- Naval Lyceum GD José Antonio Anzoátegui

== See also ==
- Píritu Islets
