= Francisco del Carmen Carvajal Municipality =

Francisco del Carmen Carvajal Municipality Municipio Francisco del Carmen Carvajal
- Municipality
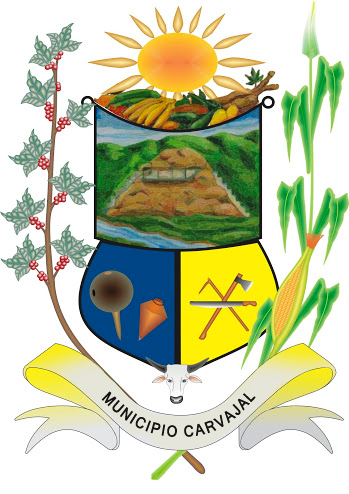
- Flag Coat of arms

- Location in Anzoátegui

- Location in Venezuela
- Coordinates: 9°52′56″N 65°40′02″W
- Country: Venezuela
- State: Anzoátegui
- Municipal seat: Valle de Guanape[*]

Government
  - Mayor: Elba Chafardet González (PSUV)

Area
  - Total: 228.7 km^{2} (88.3 sq mi)

Population (2011)
  - Total: 14,653
  - Density: 64.07/km^{2} (165.9/sq mi)
- Time zone: UTC−4 (VET)
- Area code(s): 0281
- Website: Official website

The Francisco del Carmen Carvajal Municipality is one of the 21 municipalities (municipios) that makes up the eastern Venezuelan state of Anzoátegui and, according to the 2011 census by the National Institute of Statistics of Venezuela, the municipality has a population of 14,653. The town of Valle de Guanape is the shire town of the Francisco del Carmen Carvajal Municipality.

== Demographics ==
The Francisco del Carmen Carvajal Municipality, according to a 2007 population estimate by the National Institute of Statistics of Venezuela, has a population of 12,936 (up from 11,654 in 2000). This amounts to 0.8% of the state's population. The municipality's population density is 103.49 inhabitants per square kilometre (268.0/sq mi).

== Government ==
The mayor of the Francisco del Carmen Carvajal Municipality is Franklyn Guillen, re-elected 23 November 2008 with 55% of the vote. The municipality is divided into two parishes; Valle de Guanape and Santa Bárbara (previous to 27 June 1995, the Francisco del Carmen Carvajal Municipality, or Carvajal Municipality as it was known back then, contained only a single parish).

== See also ==
- Valle de Guanape
- Anzoátegui
- Municipalities of Venezuela
