= Fernando de Peñalver Municipality =

Fernando de Peñalver Municipality Municipio Fernando de Peñalver
- Municipality
- Flag Coat of arms

- Location in Anzoátegui

- Location in Venezuela
- Coordinates: 10°02′28″N 65°07′21″W
- Country: Venezuela
- State: Anzoátegui

Government
  - Mayor: Jannette Calista Adames (PSUV)

Area
  - Total: 757.0 km^{2} (292.3 sq mi)

Population (2011)
  - Total: 33,437
  - Density: 44.17/km^{2} (114.4/sq mi)
- Time zone: UTC−4 (VET)
- Area code(s): 0281
- Website: Official website

The Fernando de Peñalver Municipality is one of the 21 municipalities (municipios) that makes up the eastern Venezuelan state of Anzoátegui and, according to the 2011 census by the National Institute of Statistics of Venezuela, the municipality has a population of 33,437. The town of Puerto Píritu is the shire town of the Fernando de Peñalver Municipality.

== Demographics ==
The Fernando de Peñalver Municipality, according to a 2007 population estimate by the National Institute of Statistics of Venezuela, has a population of 29,977 (up from 26,059 in 2000). This amounts to 2% of the state's population. The municipality's population density is 46.62 inhabitants per square kilometre (120.7/sq mi).

== Government ==
The mayor of the Fernando de Peñalver Municipality is Axel Rodriguez, elected on 23 November 2008 with 47% of the vote. He replaced Francisco José González shortly after the elections. The municipality is divided into three parishes; Capital Fernando de Peñalver, San Miguel, and Sucre.

== See also ==
- Puerto Píritu
- Anzoátegui
- Municipalities of Venezuela
