= Anzoátegui =

- State of Venezuela
- Flag Coat of arms
- Motto: Tumba de sus tiranos (English: Tomb of its tyrants)
- Anthem: Himno del Estado Anzoátegui
- Location within Venezuela
- Coordinates: 10°08′40″N 64°40′38″W
- Country: Venezuela
- Created: August 5, 1909
- Named for: José Antonio Anzoátegui
- Capital: Barcelona

Government
  - Body: Legislative Council
  - Governor: Luis José Marcano

Area
  - Total: 43,300 km^{2} (16,700 sq mi)
  - Rank: 6th
- 4.72% of Venezuela

Population (2011 est.)
  - Total: 1,469,747
  - Rank: 8th
- 5.3% of Venezuela
- Time zone: UTC−4 (VET)
- ISO 3166 code: VE-B
- Emblematic tree: Cereipo, or Guatamare (Myrospermum fructescens)
- HDI (2019): 0.723 high · 7th of 24
- Website: www.venezuelatuya.com/estados/anzoategui.htm

Anzoátegui State (Spanish: Estado Anzoátegui, IPA: [esˈtaðo ansoˈateɣi]) is one of the 23 states of Venezuela, located in the northeastern region of the country. Anzoátegui is well known for its beaches that attract many visitors. Its coast consists of a single beach approximately 100 km (62 mi) long. Its capital is the city of Barcelona, and significant cities include Puerto la Cruz and El Tigre.

== History ==
=== Spanish colonization ===
Until 1535, the lands of Anzoátegui State had not been explored by Europeans. They were inhabited by various indigenous tribes: in the northeast, occupying part of the coast and even the interior and margins of the Guatapanare River (today the Neverí River) were Cumanagotes. Towards the mouth of the Uchire River, the Tumuzas and towards the center between the Unare river and the islets of Píritu, the tribes of the Píritus and Chacopatas were located. The Palenques had formed a village in Aripata, on the right bank of the Unare, where the population of Clarines is located, but its domains encompassed the Tramojo, Chocopire and Güere River lagoons to the south. The tribe of the Cochismas was located on the banks of the Guanare River and the Guaribes occupied the area that irrigated the river of the same name. Inland, other tribes like the Quacos and Cores occupied territories up to the banks of the Orinoco River.

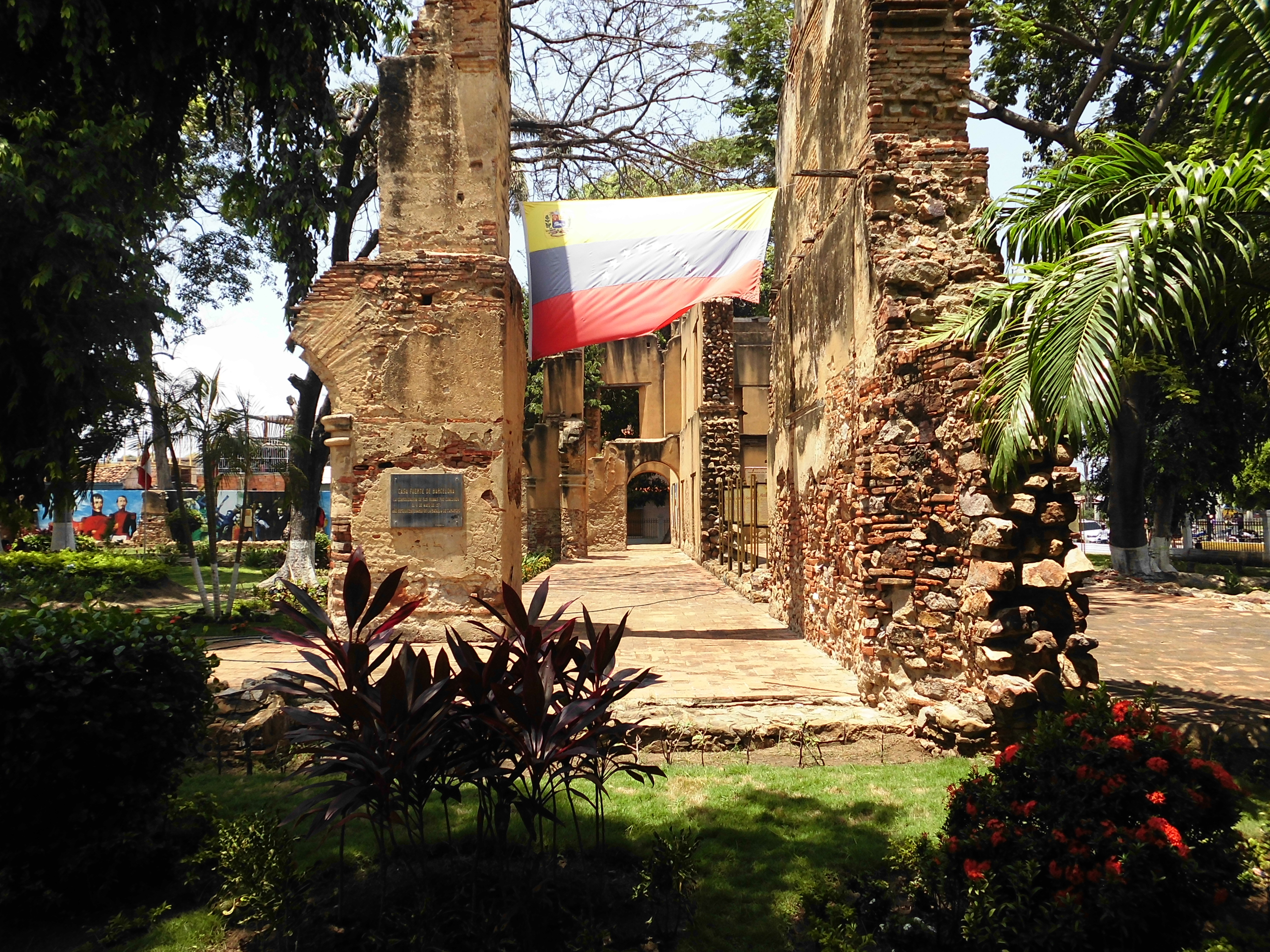
Ruins of Barcelona's Casa Fuerte, a symbol of Venezuela's struggle for independence from Spain

Since 1499 the first Spanish incursions to the beaches of Anzoátegui began through the Maracapana (Dairy) hill in search of pearls sources. With the appearance of Cubagua and its pearly potential, the stretch of land included between Cumana and the Unare River became a key supply site. However, The first Spanish settlement in the land of the Cumanagotos occurred in 1586 under the command of the Captain of Conquest Cristobal Cobos, who confronted the Cayaurima chieftain, and whose defeat was decisive for the foundation of the first city, San Cristóbal de la New Ecija. The first foundation, was followed by more than sixty years of war, until the arrival of Juan de Orpí, to whom the audience of Santo Domingo assigns the conquest of the province of the cumanagotos. He achieved his goal and in 1636 he founded Nueva Barcelona, near San Cristóbal, which coexisted between 1638 and 1670 as towns rivals because of the government dependency they had.

Today's Barcelona emerged on January 1, 1671, through the action of Father Manuel Yanques, who orders the eviction of previously founded villages with the proposal of strengthen the defence against threats from indigenous tribes, and then establish the New Barcelona of San Cristóbal de Cumanagotos. In its surroundings were formed villages of missions and doctrines, highlighting among them Our Lady of Clarines, founded in 1594; Nuestra Señora de la Concepción de Píritu, founded in 1656, which was incorporated into the province of Cumaná; San Miguel Jesús María and José de Caigua and Nuestra Señora del Pilar, among others. Until the decade of the 1930s, agriculture, fishing and livestock were the main activities of the state. Cotton and sugar cane, together with livestock and fishing, allowed since colonial times the structuring of small towns (Barcelona, Boca de Uchire, Clarines and Píritu).

=== Modern era ===
Named in honor of the great hero of Venezuelan independence, José Antonio Anzoátegui (1789-1819), this state was originally called the Province of Barcelona, receiving that name from the province of Barcelona in present-day Spain and maintained that name from the beginning of the 18th century until 1821 and then between 1830 and 1864, when its name was replaced by "Estado Barcelona", a name it kept until 1909. The city of Barcelona, which is the capital of the state, was founded by the Spanish colonists in 1677 as "New Barcelona of the Holy Hill" (Nueva Barcelona del Cerro Santo) later shortened simply to Barcelona.

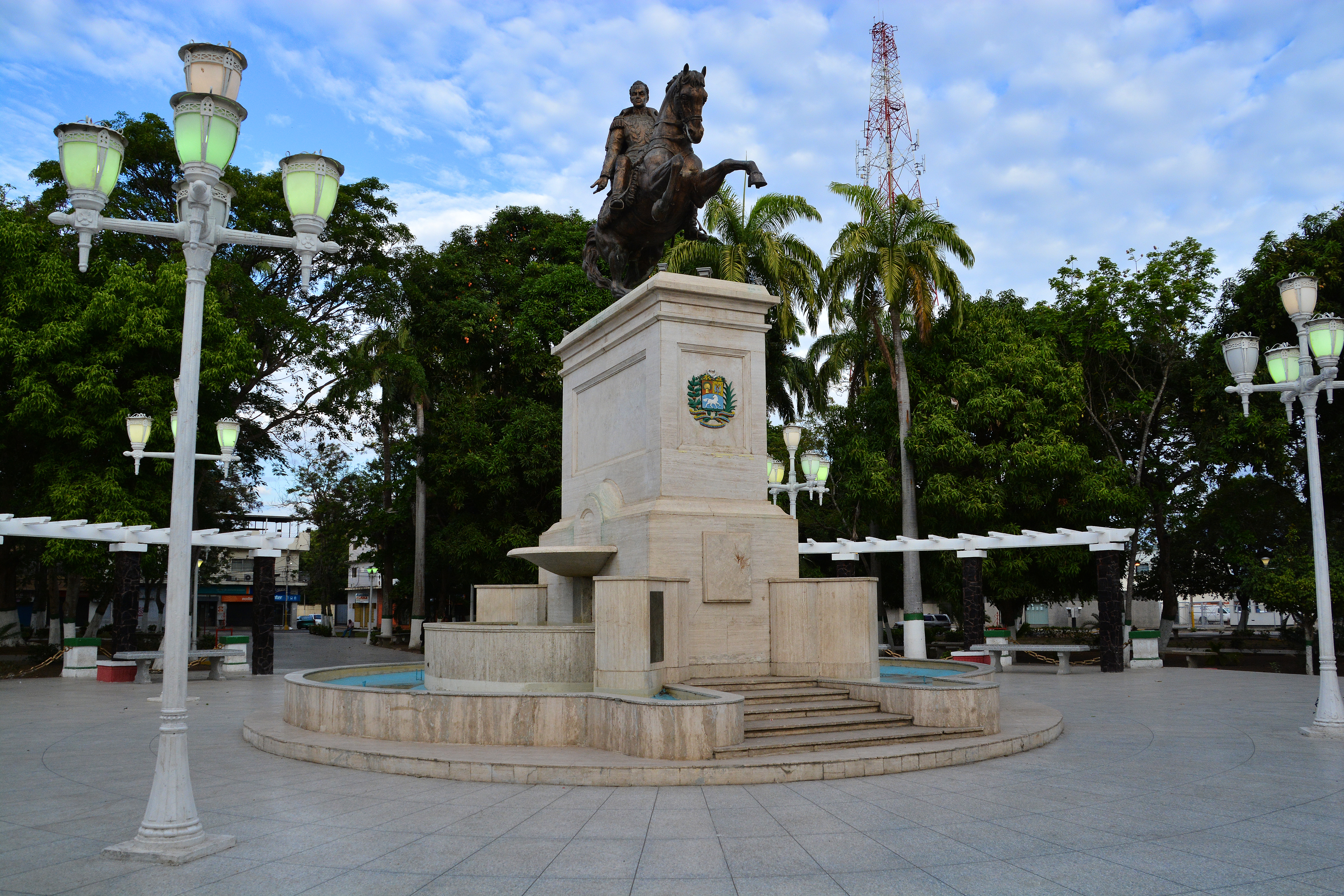
Bolívar Square, El Tigre, Anzoátegui

The present day Anzoátegui State was also included in the Province of Cumaná, which in turn was part of the Captaincy General of Venezuela, along with other provinces (Guayana, Maracaibo, Caracas, Margarita and Trinidad). In 1810 it was separated from the province. It was in 1909 when it acquired the current political distribution.

== Geography ==
The State of Anzoátegui has an area of 43,300 km^{2}. It is the sixth largest state in the country.

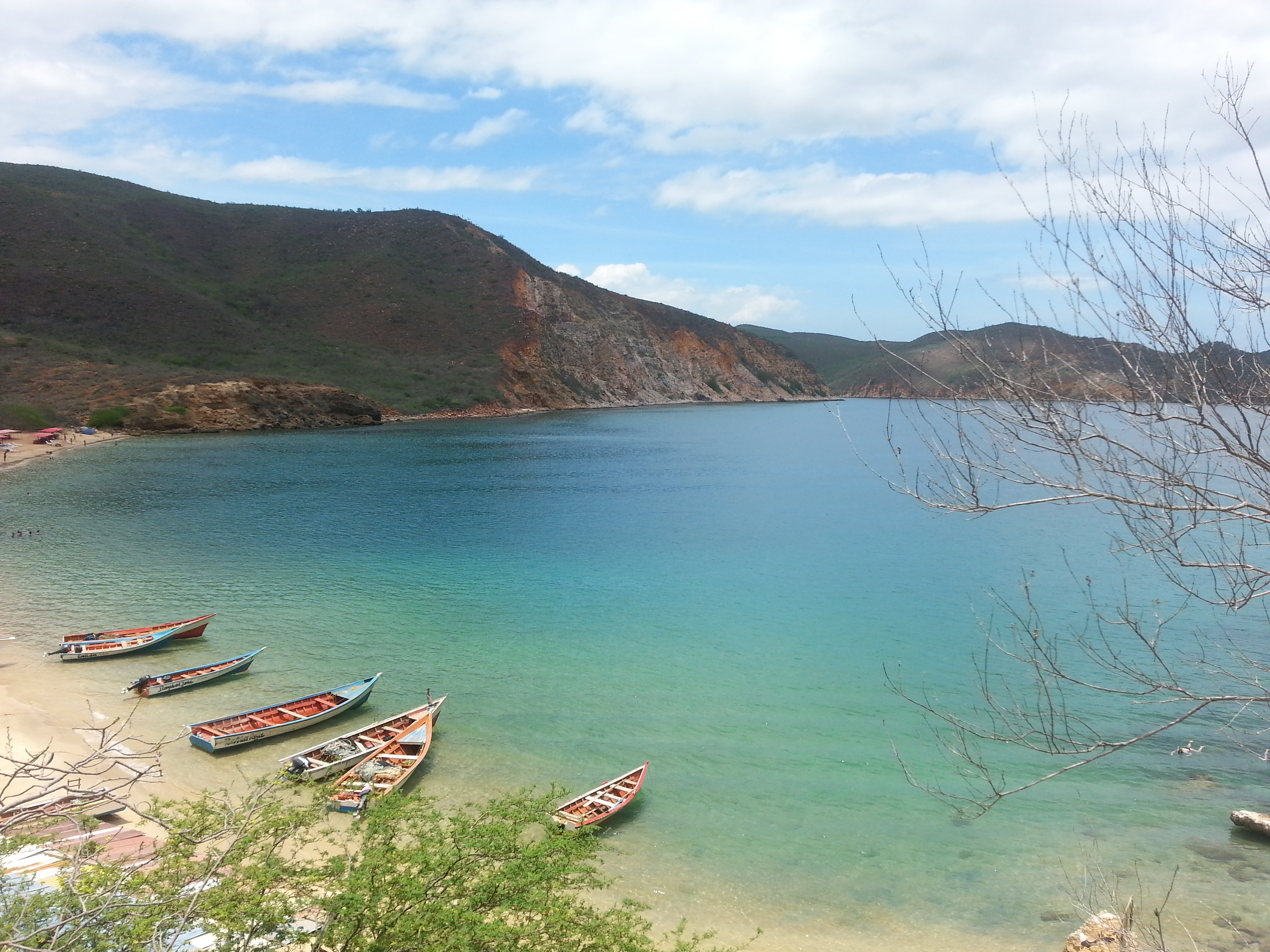
Beach in the Mochima National Park

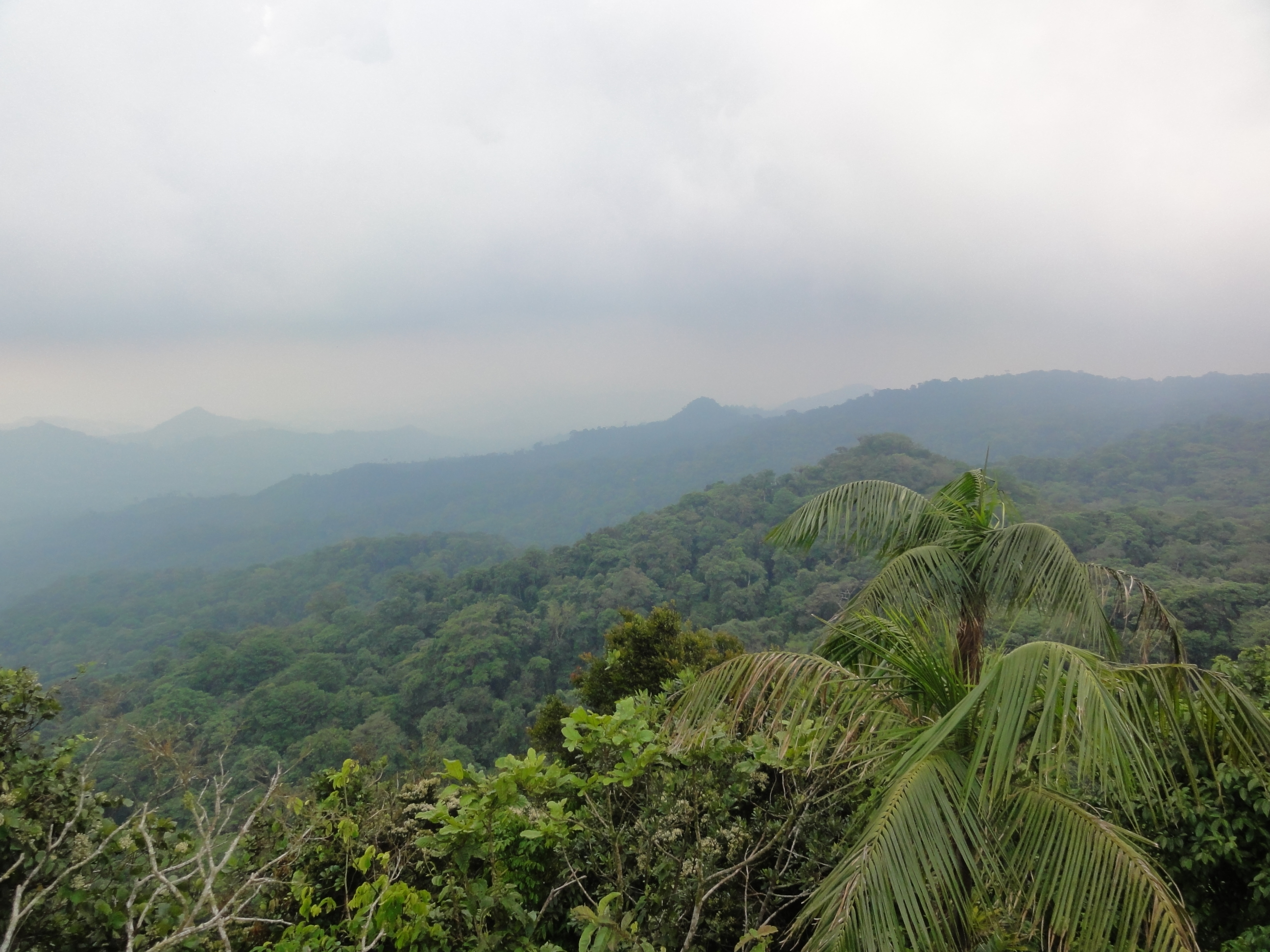
Tropical forest in the Francisco del Carmen Carvajal Municipality

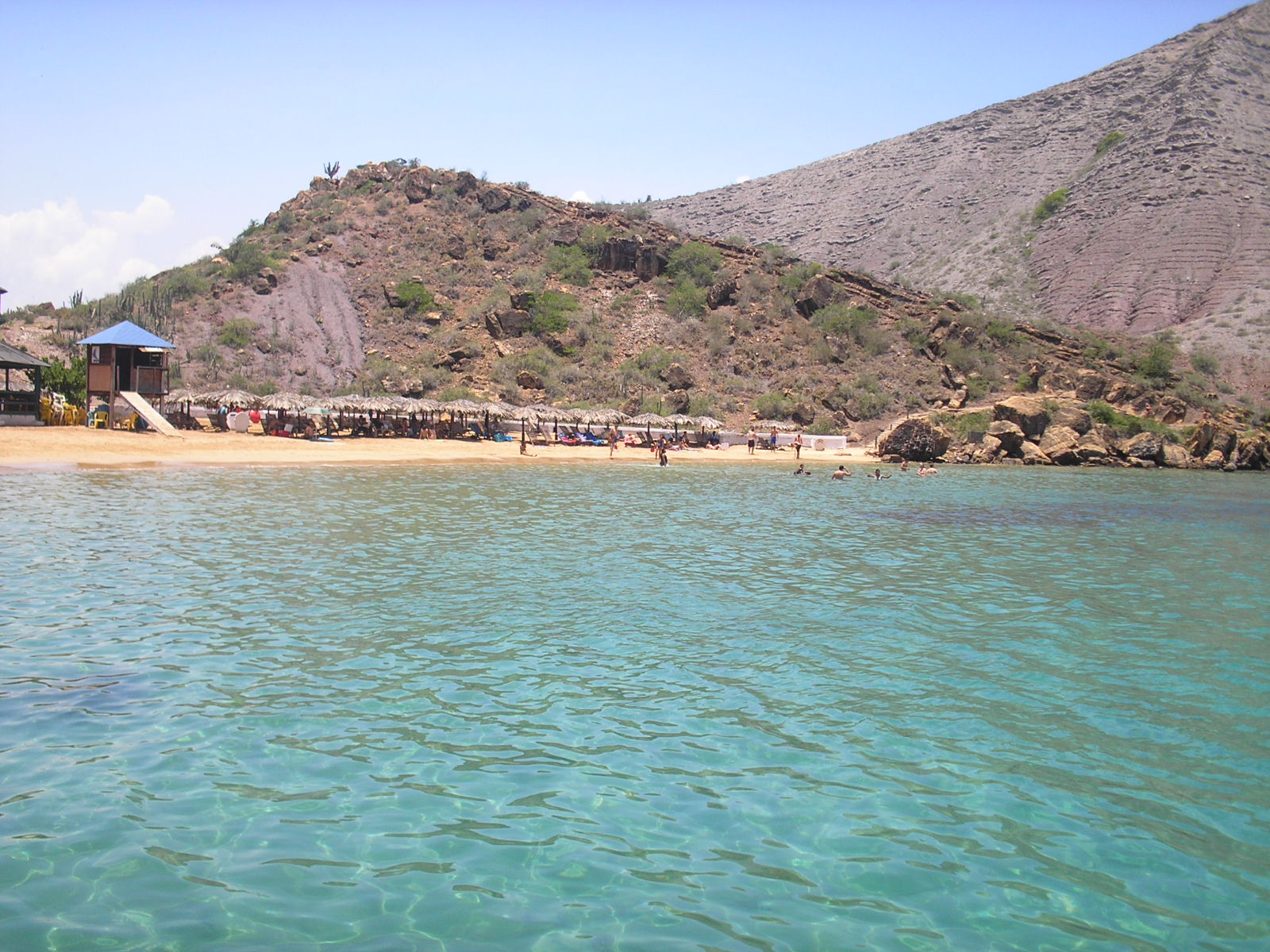
El Saco Beach in the Caribbean sea

Anzoátegui is located in the northeastern region of Venezuela country. It borders with the State of Monagas and Sucre to the east, Bolivar to the south, Guarico and Miranda to the west, and to the north by the Caribbean Sea provides water to the territory, as are the Unare and Neverí rivers (on the second slope) and the Zuata and Cabrutica rivers (on the first slope). Most of these rivers have their headwaters in the central tables. In the flat area of the coast, there are the Píritu and Unare lagoons, both of which are closed off by coastal ridges generated by the sediments carried by the Unare river.

The main rivers are Amana, Aragüita, Caris, Guanipa, Güere, Guario, Morichal Largo, Neverí, Pao, Tigre, Unare, Zuata and a sector of the lower Orinoco.

=== Vegetation ===
The vegetation of the Anzoátegui State is typical temperate. It is largely determined by altitude, climate and season of the year, where areas of snow-covered scrub, cujíes and small southern species alternate. It also has a tree called caderoms, this includes resistant or environmentally adapted varieties.

=== Flora ===
As for the flora, the species of wood trees that are most abundant are oil, pylon, carob, oak, quebrahacho, puy, araguaney, apamate, etc. The fruits present in the State are the merey, mango, guácimo, sarrapia, merecure, querebero, corn, among others.

The characteristic flora of the State of Anzoàtegui can be seen in its streets and patios of many houses, and even its squares are decorated with the characteristic trees of the region. It is important to mention, the Cayenne, which is found throughout the region: it is a tall and sometimes arborescent bush of 8-10 mts high that presents the following characteristics. The flowers are striking and large at their best, growing up to 15.24 cm. in diameter and occur in many colors such as orange, red, pink, white, yellow and salmon, and remain for most of the year. Most have bright flashes and are bell-shaped.

A tree that abounds in its main squares and roads: El Colorado or Apamate, is one of the trees of the Venezuelan flora. In some regions of the country, it is also known by the names of Roble Colorado (Zulia), Orumo (Falcón). This tree can measure up to 30 m. and has as its habitat the deciduous forest. It has purple, pink, lilac and white flowers in different shades.

There is one tree in particular that can be found in most of the towns in the State of Anzoàtegui, and in particular in the arid areas of the state. eL Cuji: Prosopis Juliflora (scientific name) is a tree up to 10–15 m high, typical of arid and semi-arid regions, chestnut green in colour, with flexible branches with long and strong thorns. It is also characterized by dull yellow flowers. Its stem is fleshy and rich in sucrose (20-25%) and 10-20% of reduced sugars. The Cují or Prosopis Juliflora is native to Peru, Chile and Argentina.

=== Mineral Resources ===
Silica sands, limestone, coal, oil, petroleum and natural gas.

=== Natural resources ===
Thermal waters Hot Waters Urica Bergantine to Aguas de Minas Umbrella

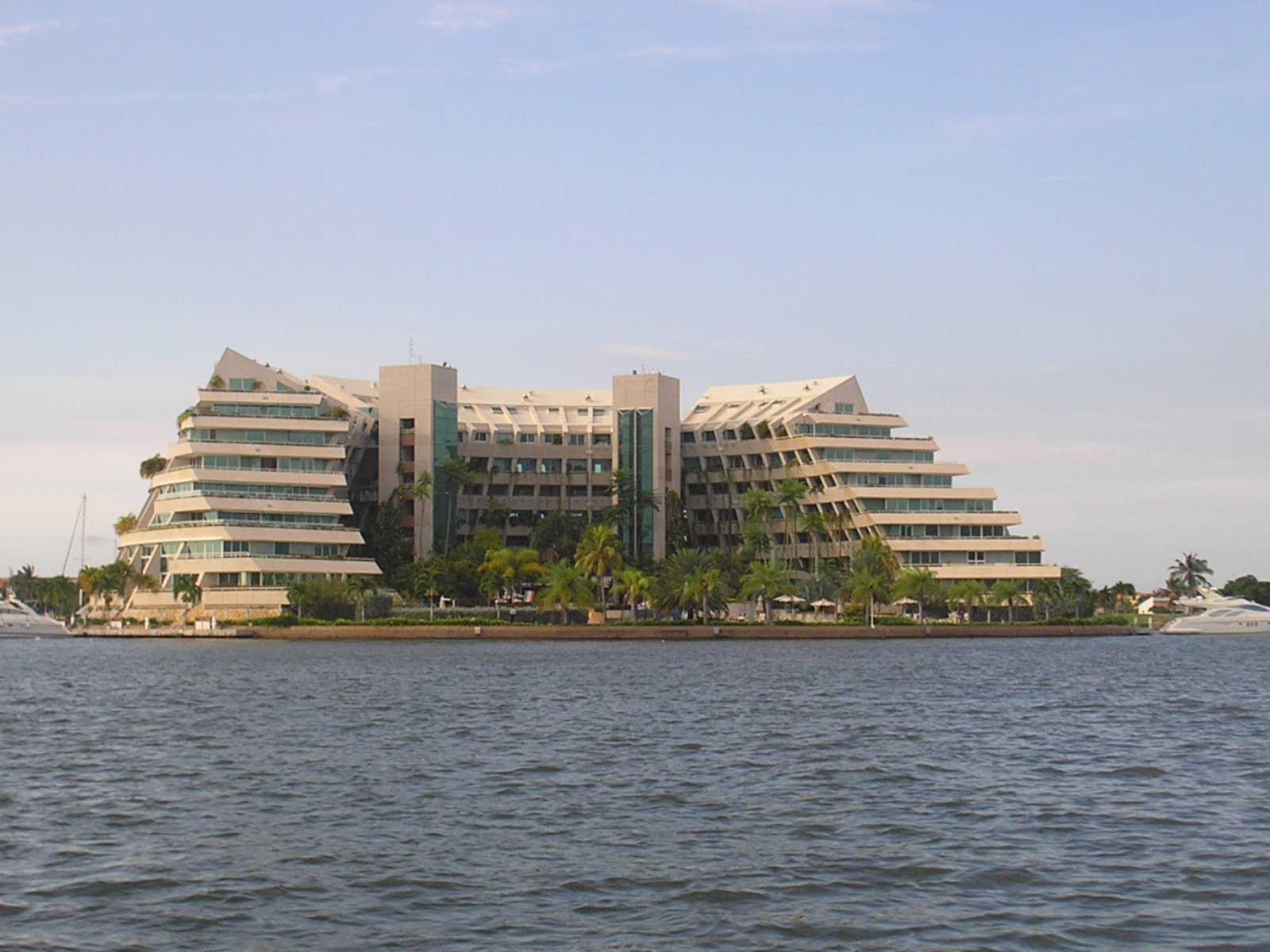
Isla Paraíso, an artificial island in Lecheria north of Anzoátegui

=== Bays ===
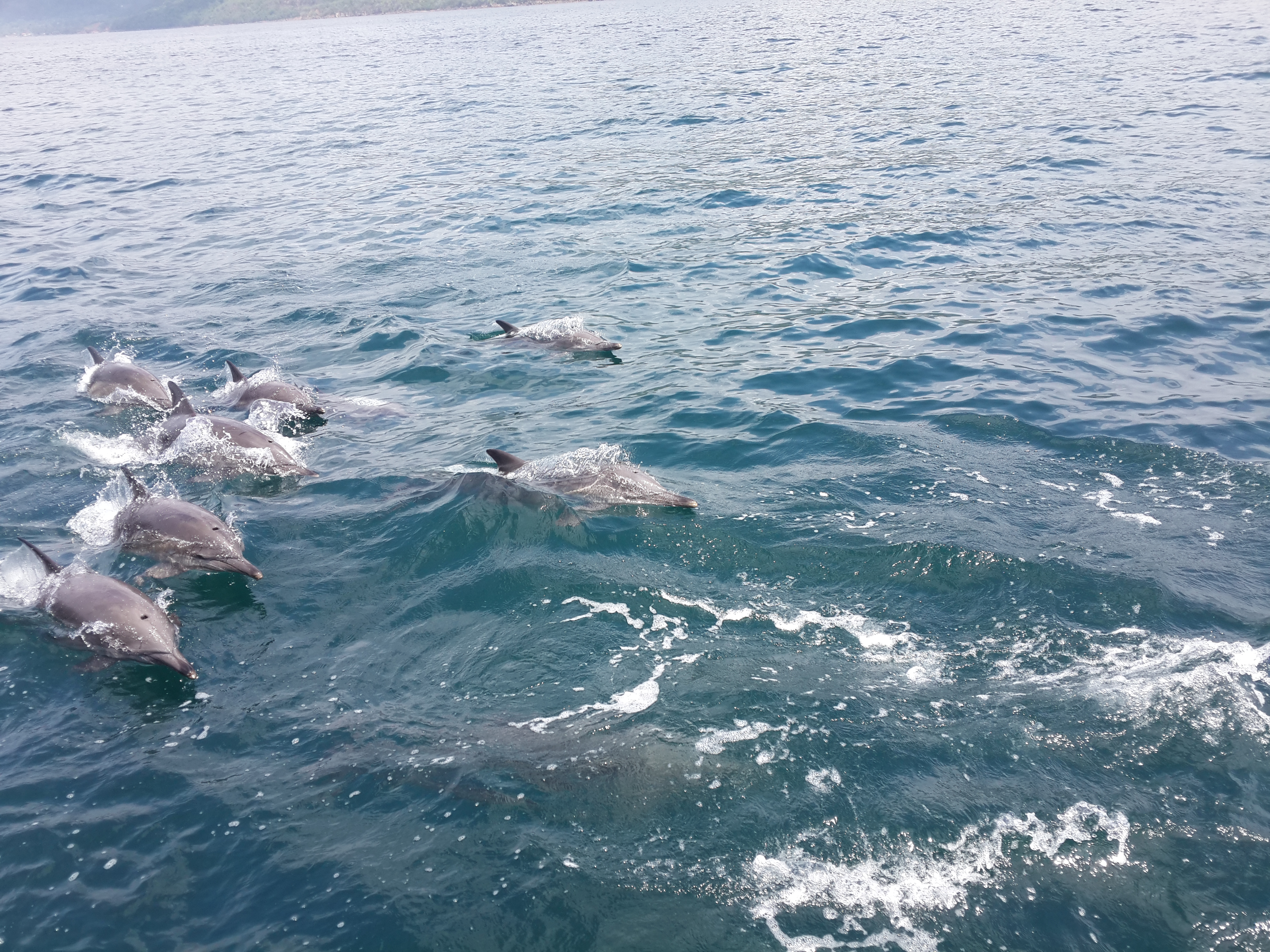
Dolphins in the Mochima National Park

- Unare
- Puerto Píritu
- Barcelona
- Pozuelos
- Guanta
- The Chaure
- El Paseo de La Cruz y El Mar
- El Paraíso

=== Islands ===
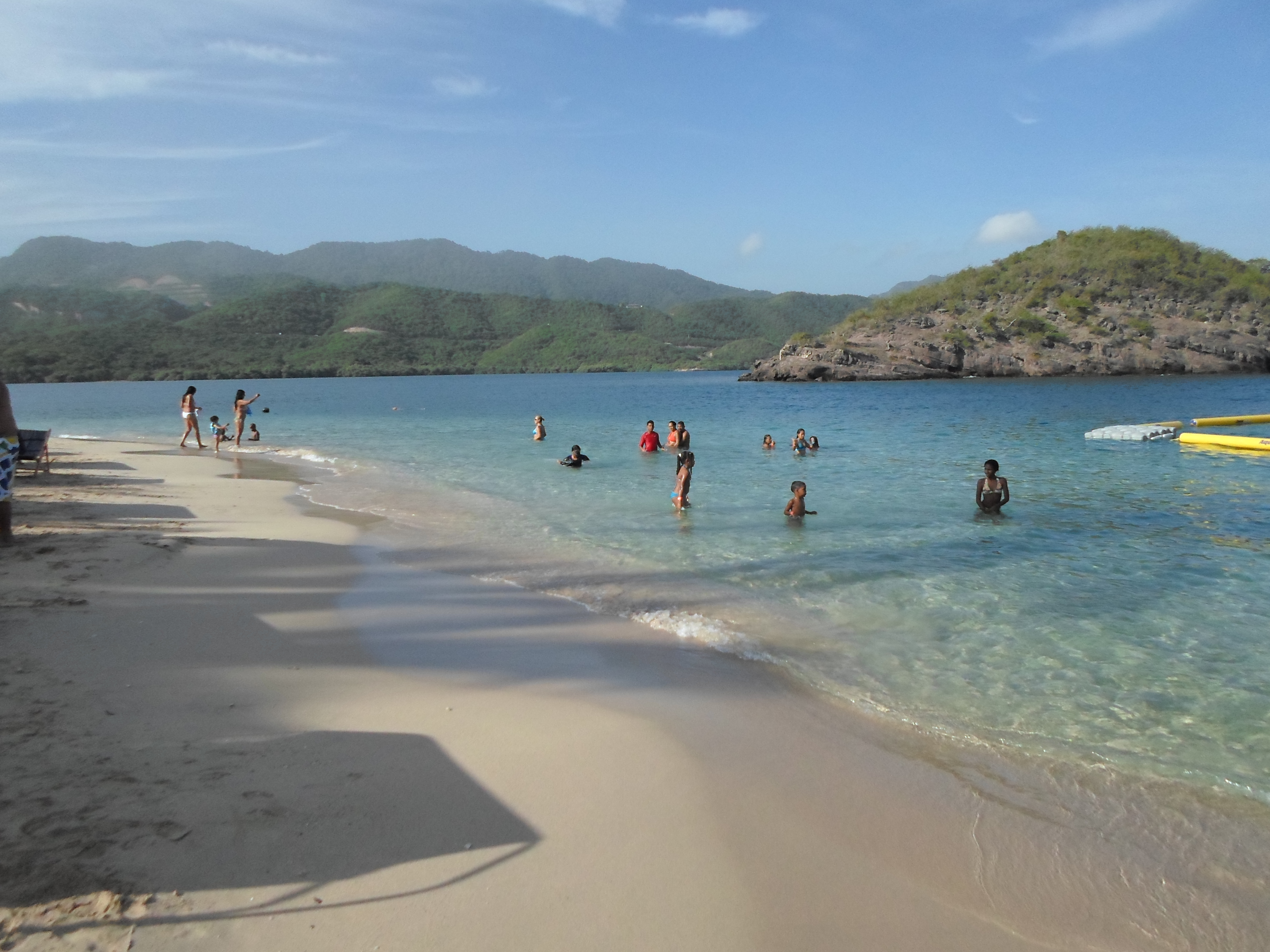
Isla de Plata

- Mono
- Tiqui-Tiqui
- Cachicamo
- Prenita
- Chimanas
- Islas Borrachas
- Plata
- Isletas de Píritu
- El Faro
- El Saco
- Puinare

=== Lakes ===
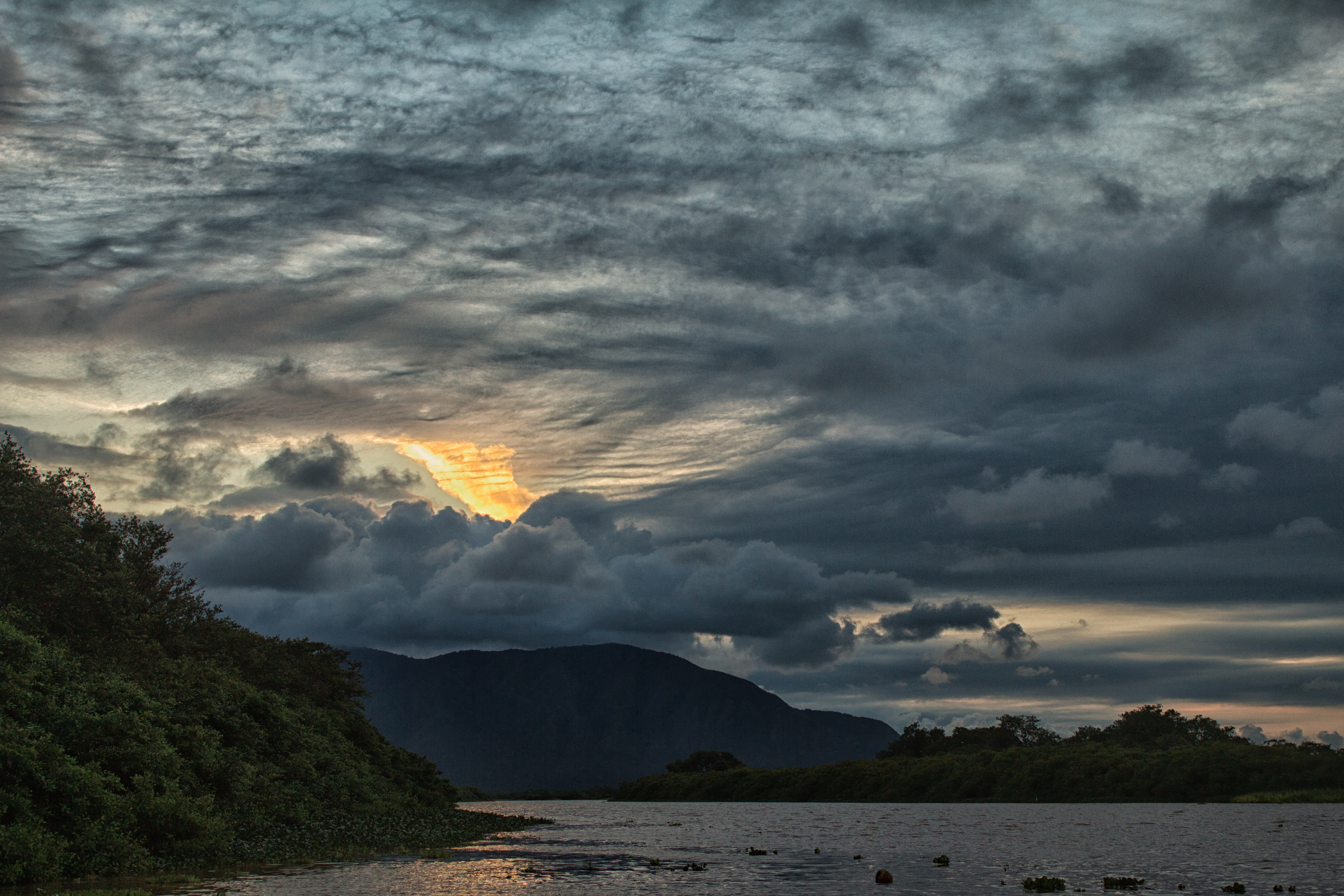
Unare River mouth, Anzoátegui

- Unare: it is the largest salt lake in Venezuela and one of the most important in all of Latin America. It is located between the municipalities of San Juan de Capistrano, Bruzual and Peñalver, in the western part of the state and extends over an area of 4,000 hectares. It receives the waters of the River of the same name and of the Caribbean. It is a refuge for hundreds of birds and marine species such as the Lebranche and the camacuto shrimp.
- Píritu: sister of Unare, its correct name is "Laguna de Píritu" and it is located in the city of Puerto Píritu. It has a great variety of mangrove vegetation and is one of the most important bird reserves (next to Unare) in the country. Given the growth of the population, it is at risk of contamination.

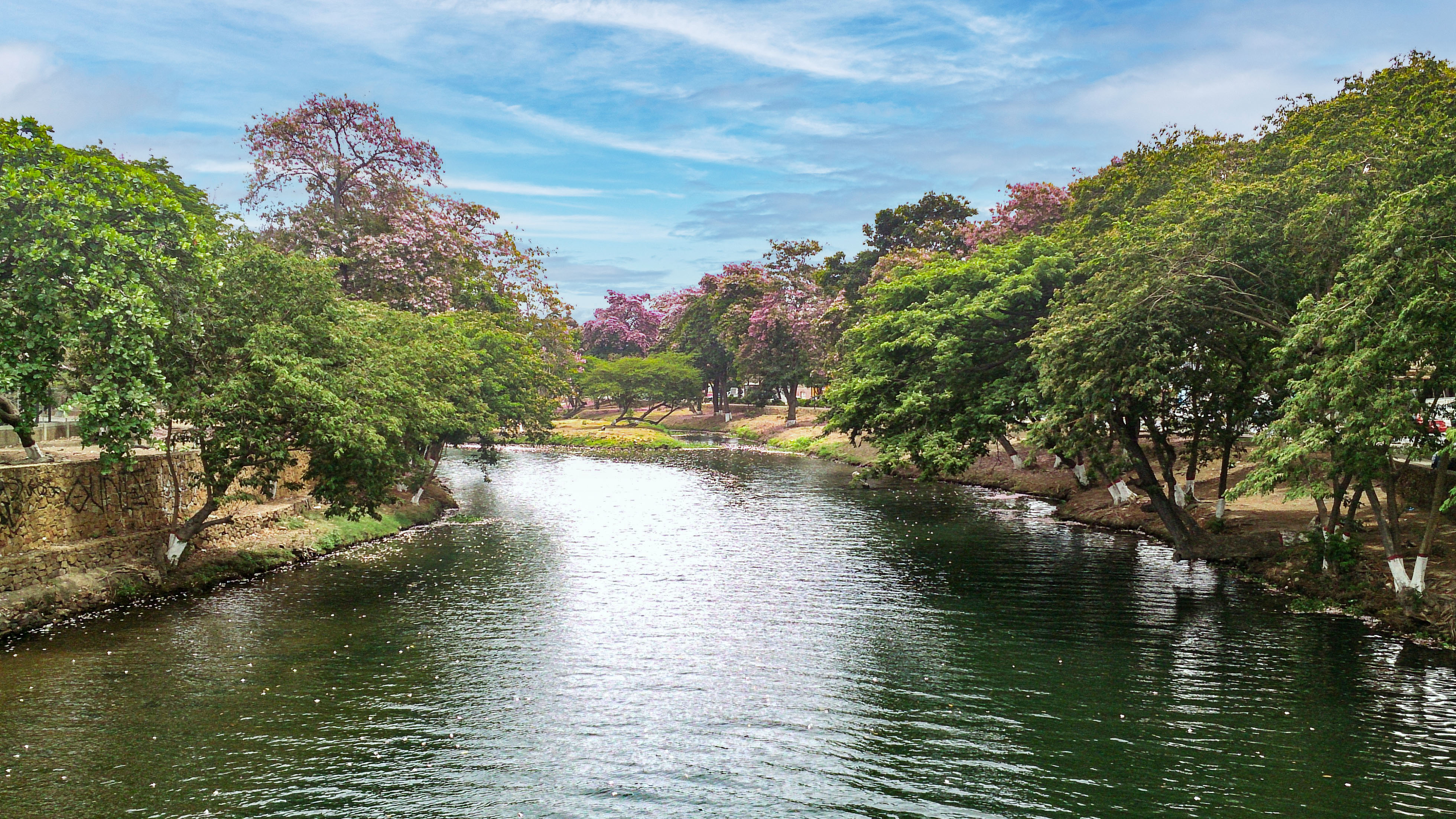
Neverí River in Barcelona, capital of Anzoátegui state

- El Paraíso: also known as "Laguna del Magüey". It is the only lagoon left within the Greater Barcelona conurbation and is part of the El Morro tourist complex. In its facilities, there was a company dedicated to the extraction of salt (Salinas El Paraíso). It is currently contaminated as it serves as a drainage system for some neighbourhoods in Puerto La Cruz.

== Politics and government ==
The State organizes its administration and public powers through the Constitution of the State of Anzoátegui, which establishes two fundamental powers: executive and legislative. The 2002 Constitution remains in force and governs the State.

=== Executive branch ===
It is composed of the Governor of Anzoátegui State and a group of state secretaries, appointed by him. The current governor is Antonio Barreto Sira of the opposition party Acción Democrática, after Nelson Moreno's "interim" management of the PSUV in the Governor's Office between 2016 and 2017.

Like the other 23 federal entities of Venezuela, the State maintains its own police force, which is supported and complemented by the National Police and the Venezuelan National Guard.

=== Legislative power ===
The state legislature is the unicameral Legislative Council of the State of Anzoátegui, elected by the people through direct and secret vote every four years, and they can be reelected for new consecutive periods, under a mixed election system (uninominal by electoral circuits with proportional representation of minorities through party list vote) of the population of the state and its municipalities. The state has 15 legislators, 14 belong to the official party and one to the opposition.

== Municipalities and municipal seats ==
Anzoátegui comprises 21 municipalities (municipios), listed below:

1. Anaco (Anaco)
2. Aragua (Aragua de Barcelona)
3. Diego Bautista Urbaneja (Lechería)
4. Fernando de Peñalver (Puerto Píritu)
5. Francisco de Carmen Carvajal (Valle de Guanape)
6. Francisco de Miranda (Pariaguán)
7. Guanta (Guanta)
8. Independencia (Soledad)
9. José Gregorio Monagas (Mapire)
10. Juan Antonio Sotillo (Puerto la Cruz)
11. Juan Manuel Cajigal (Onoto)
12. Libertad (San Mateo)
13. Manuel Ezequiel Bruzual (Clarines)
14. Pedro María Freites (Cantaura)
15. Píritu (Píritu)
16. Guanipa (San José de Guanipa/El Tigrito)
17. San Juan de Capistrano (Boca de Uchire)
18. Santa Ana (Santa Ana)
19. Simón Bolívar (Barcelona)
20. Simón Rodríguez (El Tigre)
21. Sir Arthur McGregor (El Chaparro)

== Demographics ==
Historical population
Year	Pop.	±% p.a.
1873	101,396	—
1881	123,828	+2.53%
1891	134,064	+0.80%
1920	103,573	−0.89%
1926	113,797	+1.58%
1936	130,488	+1.38%
1941	155,746	+3.60%
1950	242,058	+5.02%
1961	382,002	+4.23%
1971	506,297	+2.86%
1981	683,717	+3.05%
1990	859,758	+2.58%
2001	1,222,225	+3.25%
2011	1,469,747	+1.86%
Source: "XIV CENSO NACIONAL DE POBLACIÓN Y VIVIENDA - Resultados por Entidad Federal y Municipio del Estado Anzoátegui" (PDF). Instituto Nacional de Estadística.

Based on the 2001 census information, the estimated population of Anzoátegui State in 2007 is 1,477,900 inhabitants.

=== Race and ethnicity ===
According to the 2011 Census, the racial composition of the population was:

Racial composition	Population	%
Mestizo	—N/a	54.9
White	629,802	40.0
Black	61,406	3.9
Other race	—N/a	1.2

=== Languages ===
The most used language at official level in education, commerce and by the general population is Spanish, there are several indigenous minority tribes located in some points of the state that speak other languages besides this one. According to article 8 of the Constitution of Anzoátegui State of May 30, 2002, the official language of the state is Spanish. In addition, the Kariña language (which is one of the aboriginal tribes of the state) and the other indigenous languages spoken in the state are official for the indigenous peoples.

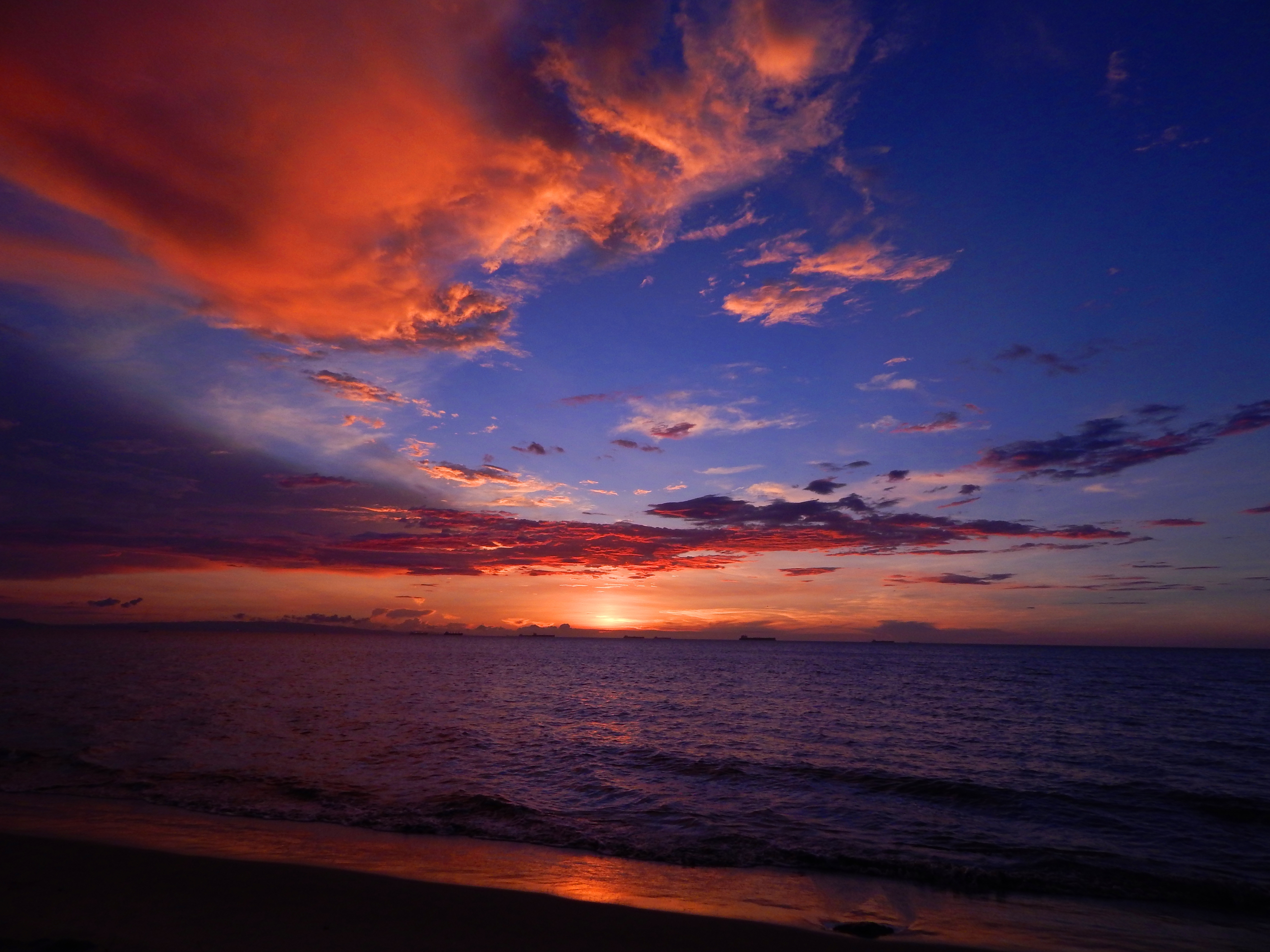
Sunrise in Playa Mansa, Lechería, Anzoátegui

== Economy ==
The economy of the state is dominated by the exploitation of oil and natural gas. The "José Antonio Anzoátegui Petrochemical Complex", located in José, to the east of Barcelona, is one of the largest petrochemical complexes in Latin America. Anzoátegui also prospers in the fishing industry, tourism, small-scale agriculture and extensive cattle raising. The economy of Anzoátegui State is characterized by the predominance of oil and agricultural activities, however, there are favorable expectations of development in the secondary and tertiary sectors, with the installation of important industries such as: automotive, construction materials, oil derivatives, agro-industry, and on the other hand, tourist, commercial and financial activities.

The production of hydrocarbons represents an important part within the national context, occupying a considerable physical space. In the Anaco-Aragua sector in Barcelona and El Tigre are the aspects related to the extraction phase, while the industrial activities of refining are carried out in Puerto La Cruz and San Roque. Likewise, the Cryogenic Complex of Oriente is located in Jose. The largest proportion of the so-called "Orinoco Belt" is located in the south of the state, constituting the largest oil reserve on the planet.

The amount of land used for agricultural activity has been growing after a prolonged period of stagnation, as a consequence of the development of the oil activity. According to the Agricultural Statistical Yearbook of the MAC 89/91, the main items cultivated in the state are: soy, peanuts, corn, cotton, cane, sorghum, coffee, cocoa, cambur, roots and tubers. Another relevant agricultural activity is the exploitation of forest resources: according to the statistics of the Venezuelan Autonomous Forest Service (SEFORVEN), for the year 1990 the state produced 1,033,100 m^{3} of wood logs (0.18% of the national total).

In the cattle activity they emphasize: cattle with 614 097 heads; pigs with 100 097 heads and birds with 4 019 816 units. The development of the state has been centered in the coastal strip, where 50% of the population is located, generating conflicts of use by the occupation of the space between the tourist, industrial oil, mining, residential and commercial activities.

Tourism currently plays an important role in the development of Puerto La Cruz and other coastal towns.

International restaurant company Churro Mania originated in the Anzoateguian city of Lecheria.

Industrial: Crude and refined petroleum, natural gas and its derivatives, coal, cement, food products and beverages.

Forestry: olive, araguaney, ceiba, cereiba, cereipo, cují, jobo and vera.

Minerals: siliceous sands, limestone, coal, oil, etc.

=== Tourism ===
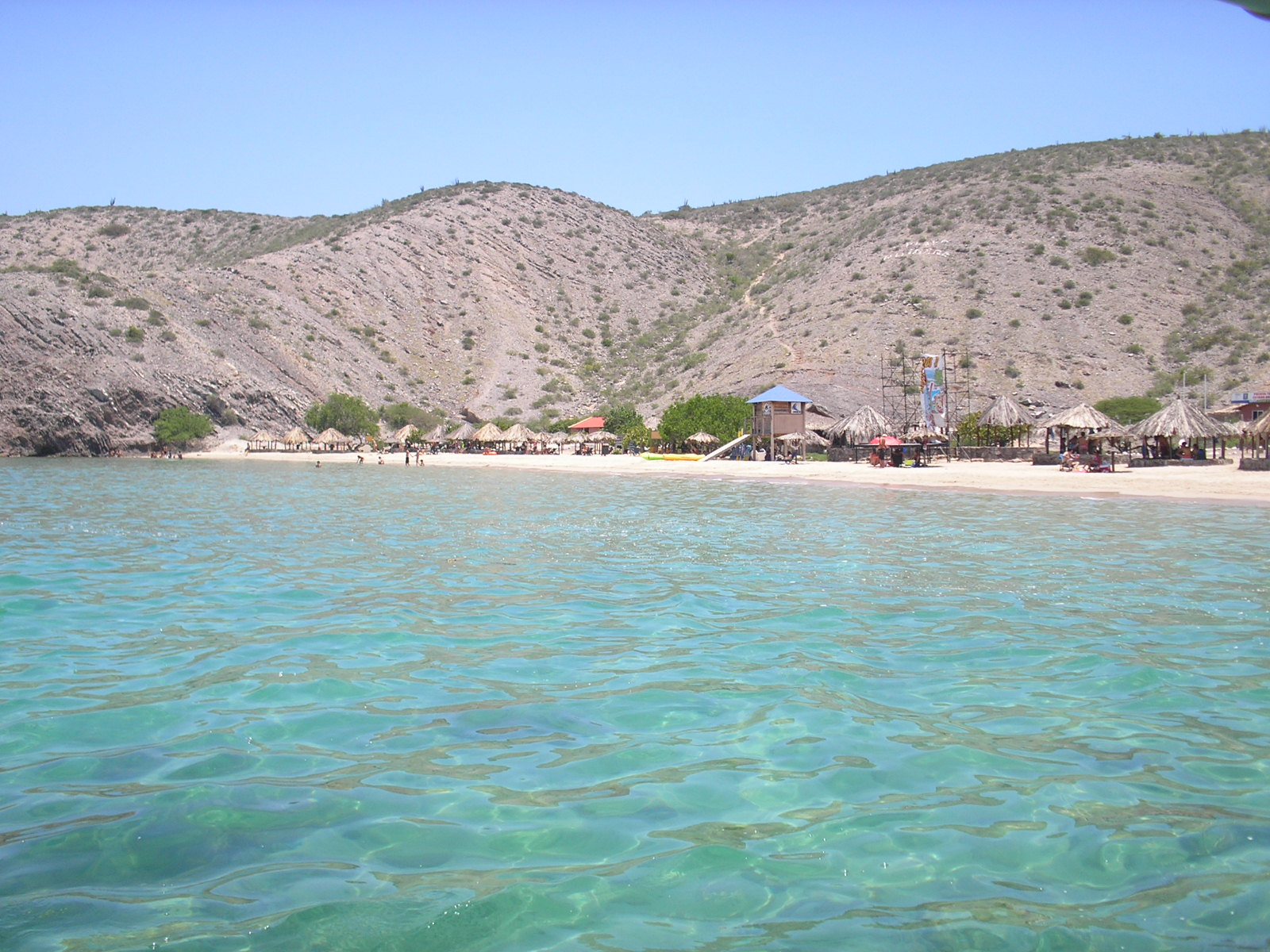
Puinare Beach, Chimana Grande Island, Anzoátegui

Mochima National Park is the second marine park decreed in the country, it is shared with the state of Sucre, it gathers several islands and islets such as Chimanas, Mono, Picuda Grande, Caracas, Venado, borracha. On the coastal side it occupies a mountainous area with a group of beaches, gulfs and coves. The mountainous part is made up of sedimentary rocks of steep relief with slopes that fall abruptly towards the sea. They are giant cliffs devoid of vegetation, which form strange figures in the stone. The coastal vegetation is essentially thorny, where cactus and shrubs such as cuji, dividivi, yacure, guamacho, espinito and retama predominate. Towards the insular sector there are three species of buttonwood mangrove. Ascending there is an area where species like the vera palo santo, the guatacaro, the jobo pelón, the cardón and the araguaney can be observed. From the 900 m above sea level, the premontane rainforest appears.

Sea birds abound in this area, such as the gull, the gannet and the earwig. Towards the heights are the paraulata, the maraquera pigeon, the guacharaca and the conoto. Among the few mammals that inhabit the cloudy areas are the cachicamo, the lapa, the jaguar, the fox and the capuchin monkey. On the islands of the park, fauna is scarce and consists of lizards and iguanas. Marine species are abundant such as: sardine, mackerel, horse mackerel, cataco, lampara, yellowfin and blackfin tuna, lebranche, mullet, mojarra and snook; while in the depths species like corocoro, snapper, grouper, curvina, roncador, cazón, the blue shark and widow are abundant. The coves are rich in crustaceans and molluscs.

The following islands in Anzoátegui State are part of Mochima National Park:

- Chimana Islands: West Chimana, Big Chimana, South Chimana, Second Chimana, Little Chimana, El Burro, Morro Pelotas.
- Borrachas Islands: La Borracha, El Borracho, Los Borrachitos.
- Picuda Islands: Picuda Grande, Picuda Chica, Quirica, Cachicamo, Isla de Plata, Isla de Monos, Tiguitigue.

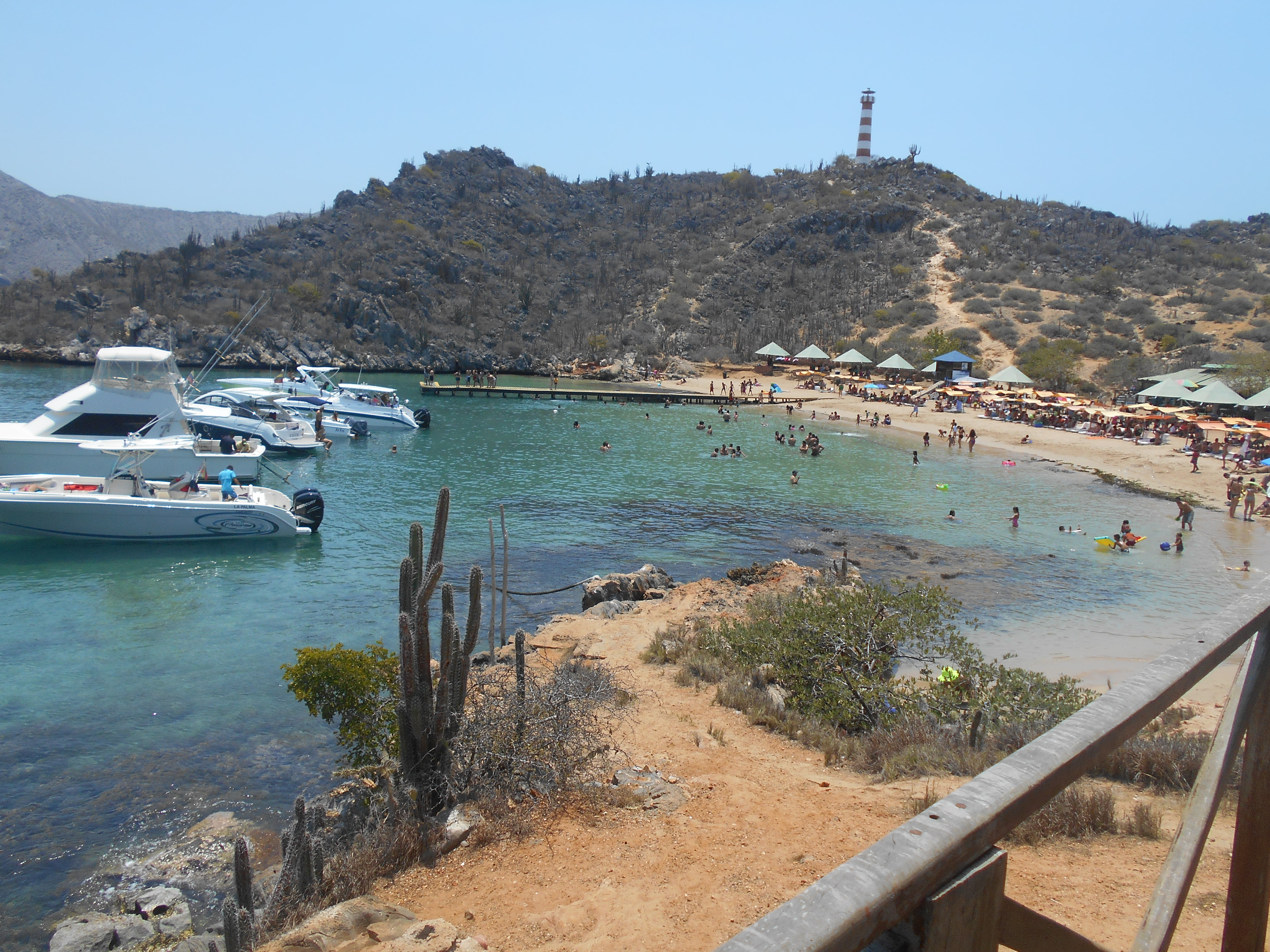
El Faro Island (Chimana Segunda), Mochima National Park

== Sports ==
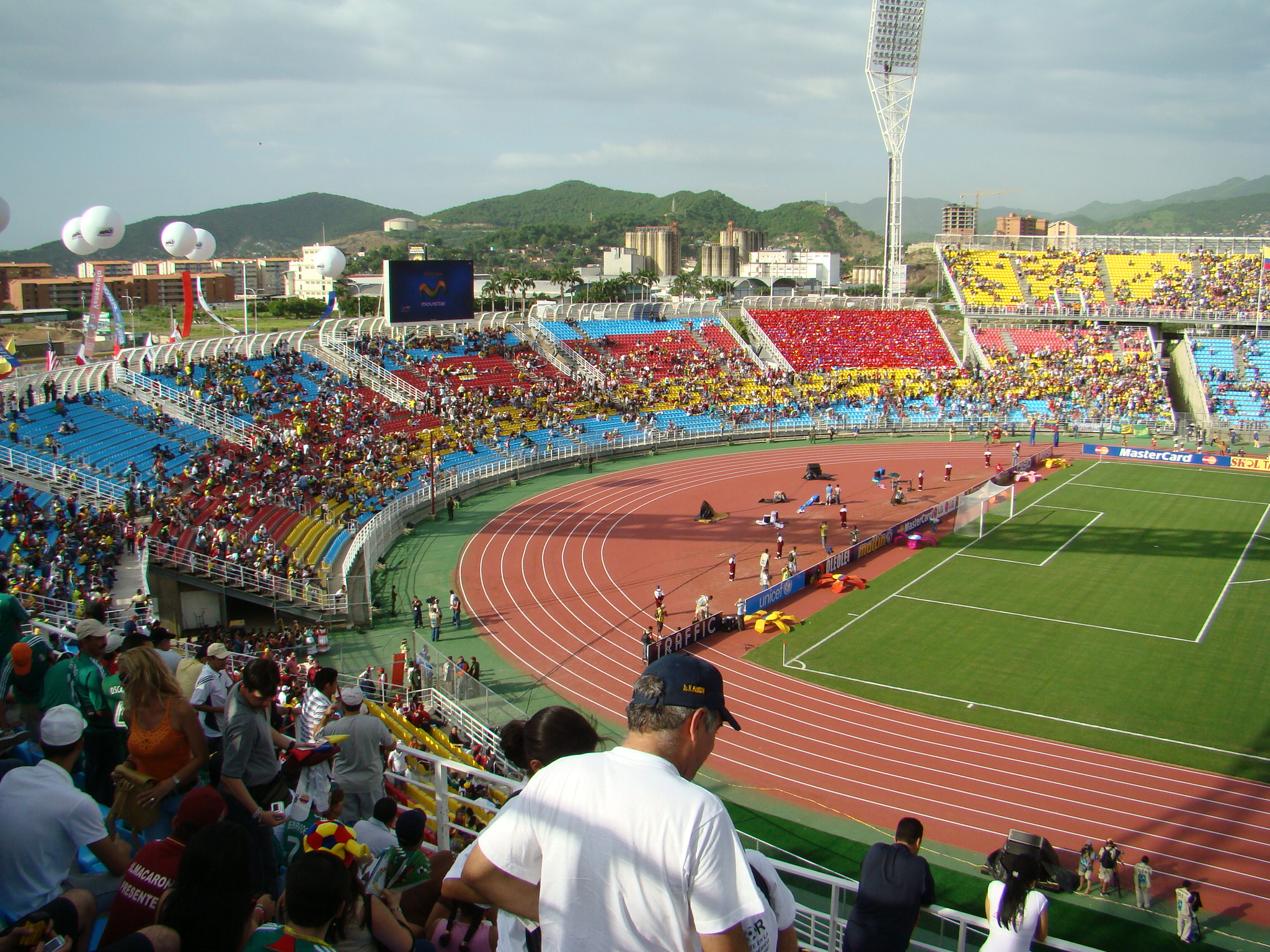
José Antonio Anzoátegui Stadium

The State of Anzoátegui has teams in various sports; in professional baseball, the team "Caribes de Anzoátegui" stands out, with headquarters in the Alfonso Chico Carrasquel Stadium, with a capacity for 18 thousand spectators, and the Enzo Hernández Stadium; in basketball, Marinos de Anzoátegui is present, with headquarters in the Luis Ramos Gymnasium (informally called "the devil's cauldron" ("La Caldera del Diablo")), with a capacity for 5,500 spectators; in soccer, the Deportivo Anzoátegui is present, whose headquarters is the José Antonio Anzoátegui Stadium, with a capacity for 40,000 spectators.

== See also ==
- States of Venezuela
