= Píritu Municipality, Falcón =

Municipality in Falcón, Venezuela

Píritu Municipality Municipio Píritu
- Municipality
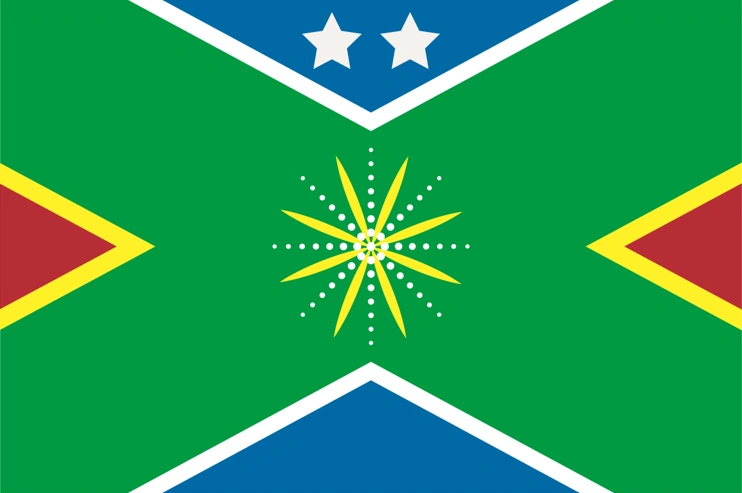
- Flag

- Location in Falcón

- Location in Venezuela
- Country: Venezuela
- State: Falcón
- Municipal seat: Píritu

Government
  - Mayor: Ivis Vegas Veloz (PSUV)

Area
  - Total: 1,376.1 km^{2} (531.3 sq mi)

Population (2011)
  - Total: 12,175
  - Density: 8.8475/km^{2} (22.915/sq mi)
- Time zone: UTC−4 (VET)

Píritu Municipality is located in Falcón state, Venezuela. The municipality has a total surface of 1168 km^{2} and it has some 12,175 inhabitant (2011 census). Its capital is Píritu.
