= Sucre (disambiguation) =

Sucre is the constitutional capital of Bolivia.

Sucre may also refer to:

== People ==
- Sucre family, a prominent Venezuelan political family
- Antonio José de Sucre (1795-1830), a South American independence leader
- Guillermo Sucre (1933–2021) Venezuelan poet
- Jesús Sucre, Major League Baseball catcher
- José Antonio Ramos Sucre (1890-1930) Venezuela poet
- Juan Manuel Sucre Figarella, Venezuelan general
- Leopoldo Sucre Figarella, Venezuelan politician
- Luis Alberto Sucre, Venezuelan historian

=== Fictional characters ===
- Fernando Sucre, a fictional Puerto Rican character from the US television series Prison Break

== Places ==
=== Political divisions ===
Bolivia

- Sucre, Chuquisaca, a municipality in the department of Chuquisaca

Colombia

- Sucre Department, one of the 32 departments which make up the country
- Sucre, Cauca, a municipality in the department of Cauca
- Sucre, Sucre Department, a municipality in the department of Sucre

Ecuador

- Sucre Canton, a canton in the province of Manabí
- Sucre, Manabí, a town in the province of Manabí

Peru

- Sucre Province, in the Ayacucho Region
- Sucre District, in Celendín Province, Cajamarca Region

Venezuela

- Sucre, Venezuela, one of the 23 states which make up the country
- Antonio José de Sucre, Venezuela a municipality in the state of Barinas
- Sucre, Aragua, a municipality in the state of Aragua
- Sucre, Bolívar, a municipality in the state of Bolívar
- Sucre, Falcón, a municipality in the state of Falcón
- Sucre Municipality, Mérida, a municipality in the state of Mérida
- Sucre Municipality, Miranda, a municipality in the state of Miranda
- Sucre, Portuguesa, a municipality in the state of Portuguesa
- Sucre Municipality, Sucre, a municipality in the state of Sucre
- Sucre, Táchira, a municipality in the state of Táchira
- Sucre, Trujillo, a municipality in the state of Trujillo
- Sucre, Yaracuy, a municipality in the state of Yaracuy
- Sucre, Zulia, a municipality in the state of Zulia

=== Locations ===
- Juana Azurduy de Padilla International Airport, also known as Sucre Airport
- Roman Catholic Archdiocese of Sucre of Bolivia

== Animals ==
- Sucre spiny rat
- Sucre antpitta, a bird

== Organizations ==
- Sucré, a bakery in New Orleans, United States
- Sucré (band), an American musical group
- Sucre F.C., a former football (soccer) team
- University of Sucre, in Colombia

== Economics ==
- Ecuadorian sucre, Ecuador's former currency
- SUCRE, a virtual currency of the Bolivarian Alliance for the Americas

== Other uses ==
- "Sucre", French for sugar
  - "Sucre à la crème", a Quebecois confectionery
- Sucre Cathedral
- Mission Sucre, Venezuelan social program

== See also ==
- Sucre Municipality (disambiguation)
- Universitario de Sucre, aka U de Sucre, a soccer team
- AeroSucre, cargo airline
- Mariscal Sucre International Airport, Ecuador
- Old Mariscal Sucre International Airport, Ecuador
- Mariscal Sucre Airport (Venezuela)
- Estadio Antonio José de Sucre
- Sugar
