= List of city flags in Venezuela =

This is a list of city flags in Venezuela.

== Amazonas ==
La Esmeralda

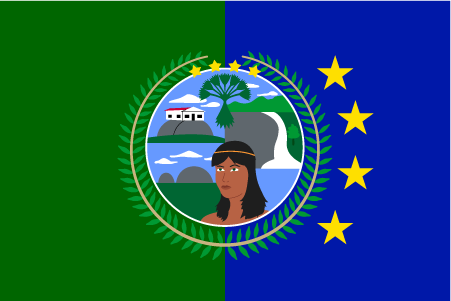
Puerto Ayacucho

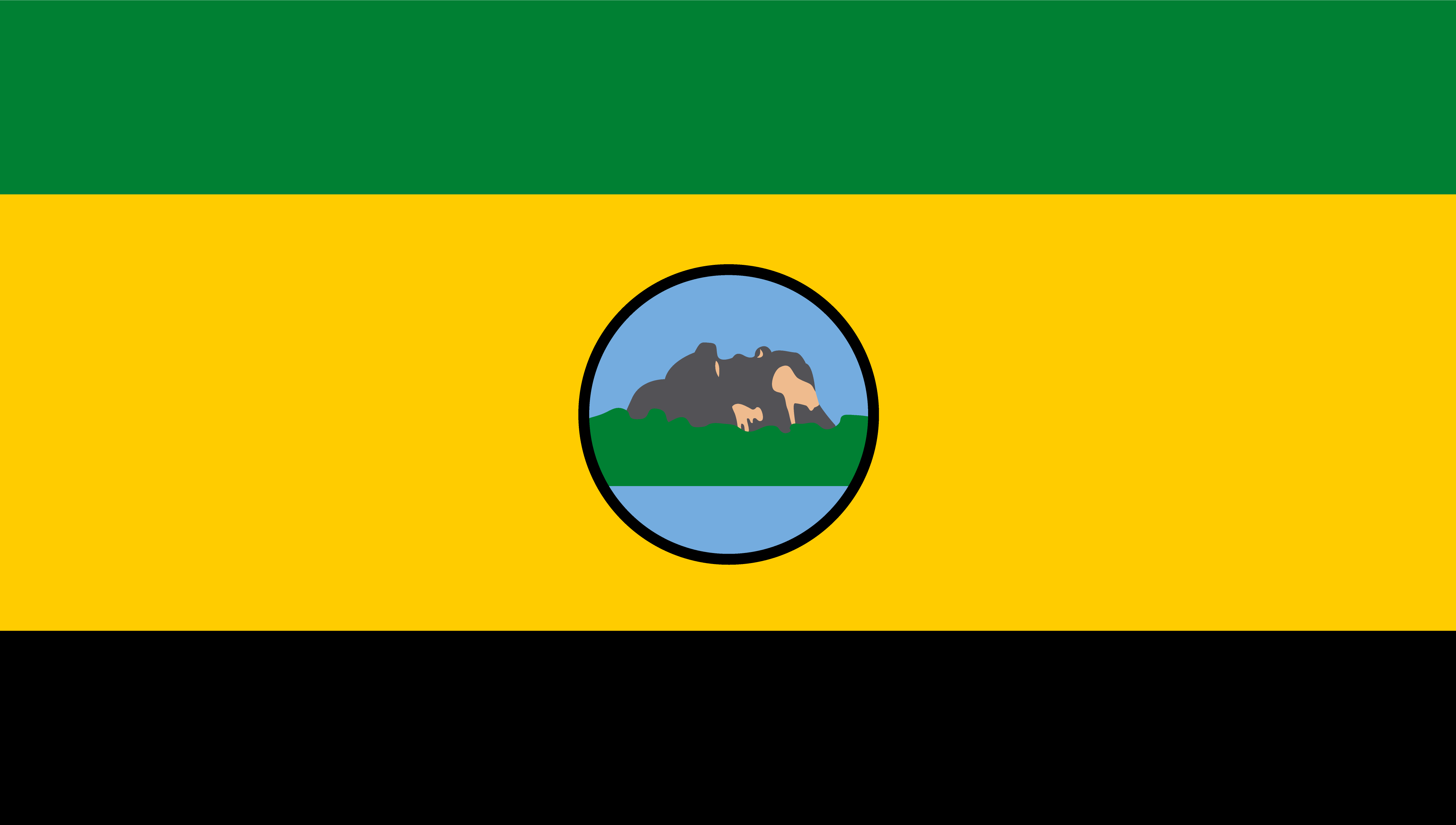
San Carlos de Río Negro

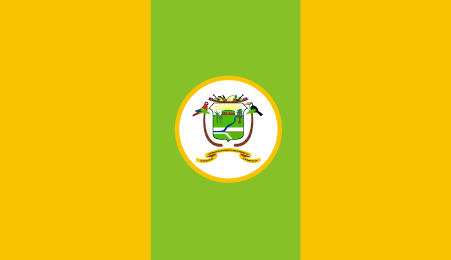
San Fernando de Atabapo

== Anzoátegui ==
Anaco

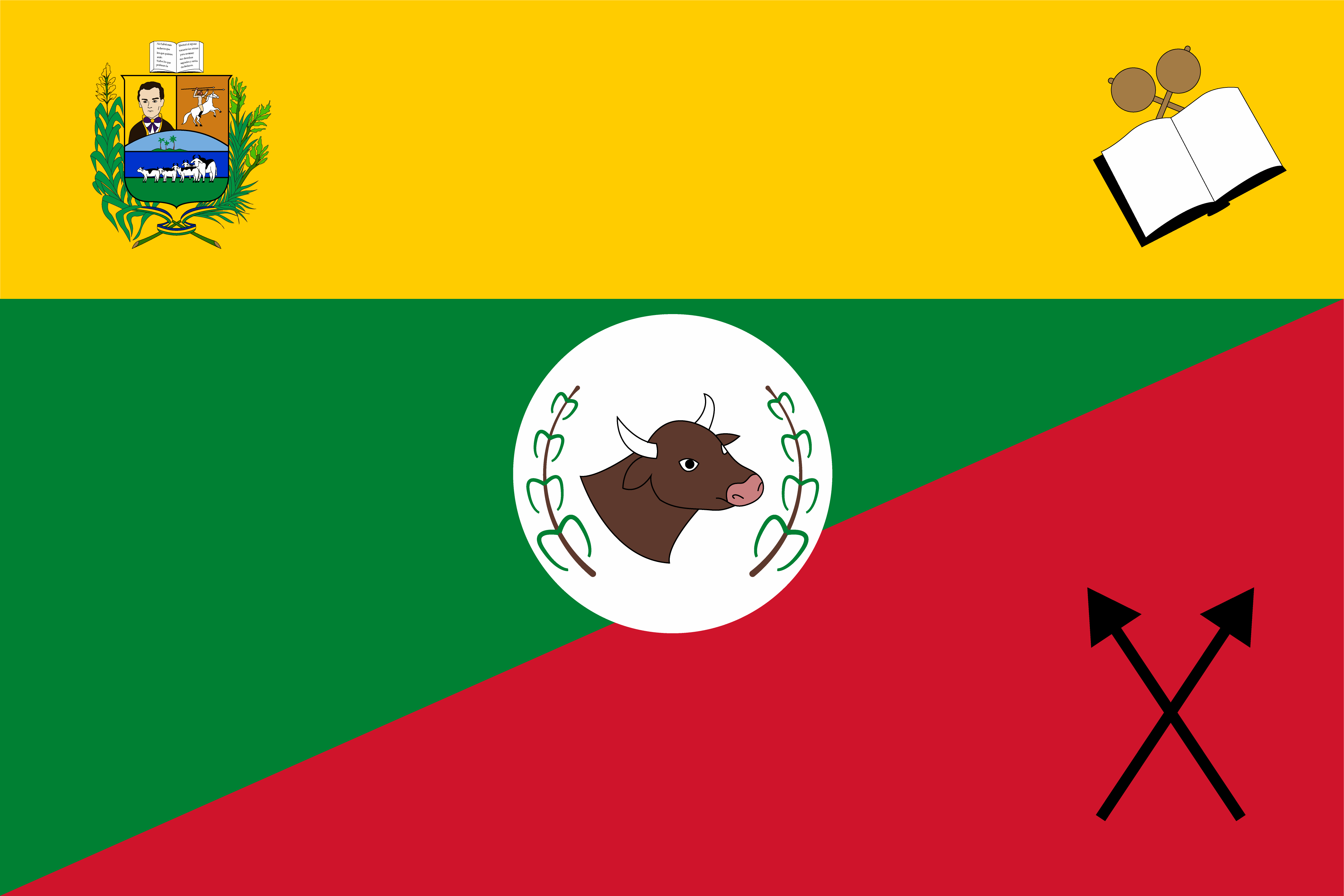
Aragua de Barcelona

Barcelona

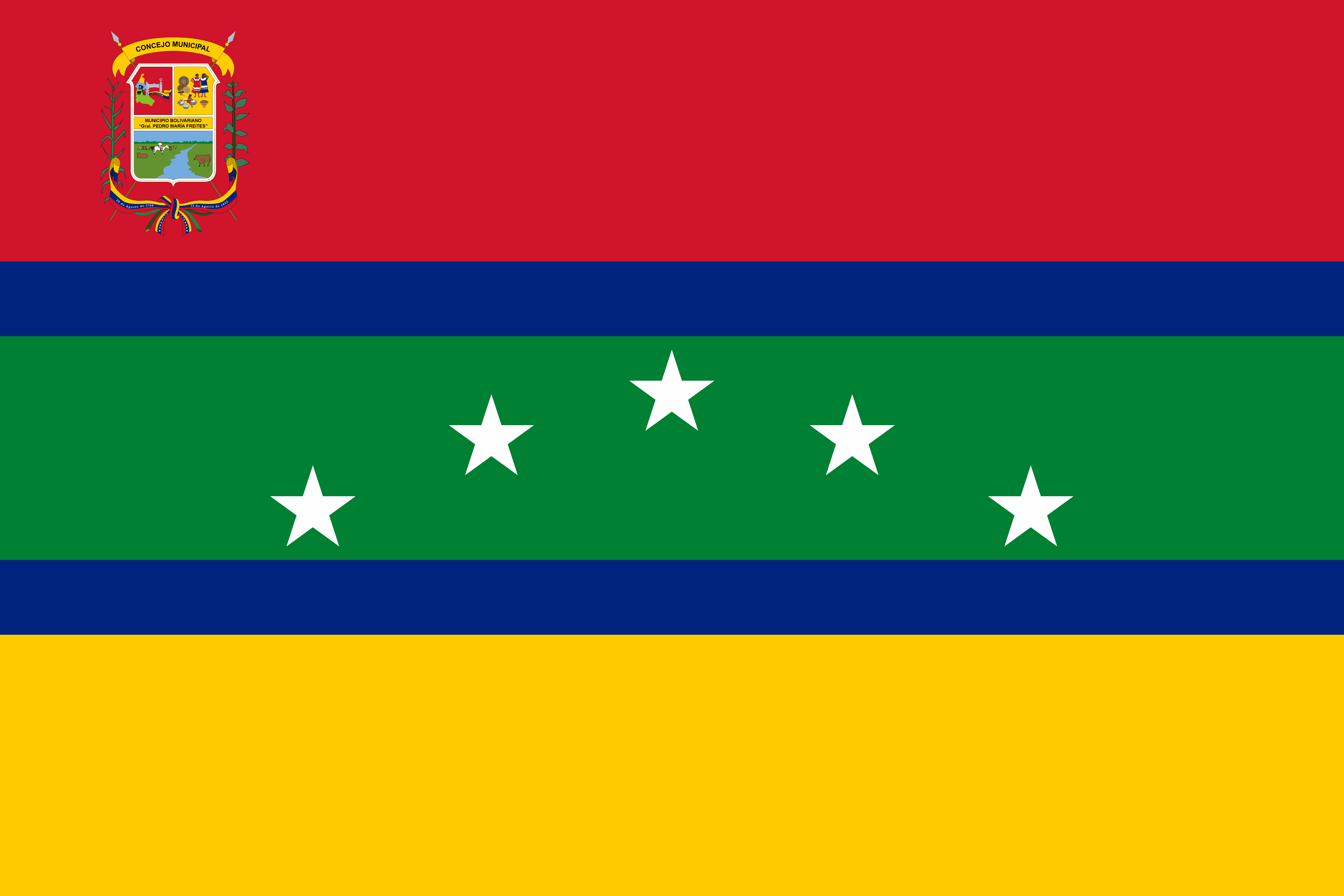
Cantaura

Ciudad Orinoco

Clarines

El Chaparro

El Tigre

Guanta

Lechería

Mapire

Píritu

Puerto la Cruz

Puerto Píritu

San José de Guanipa

San Mateo

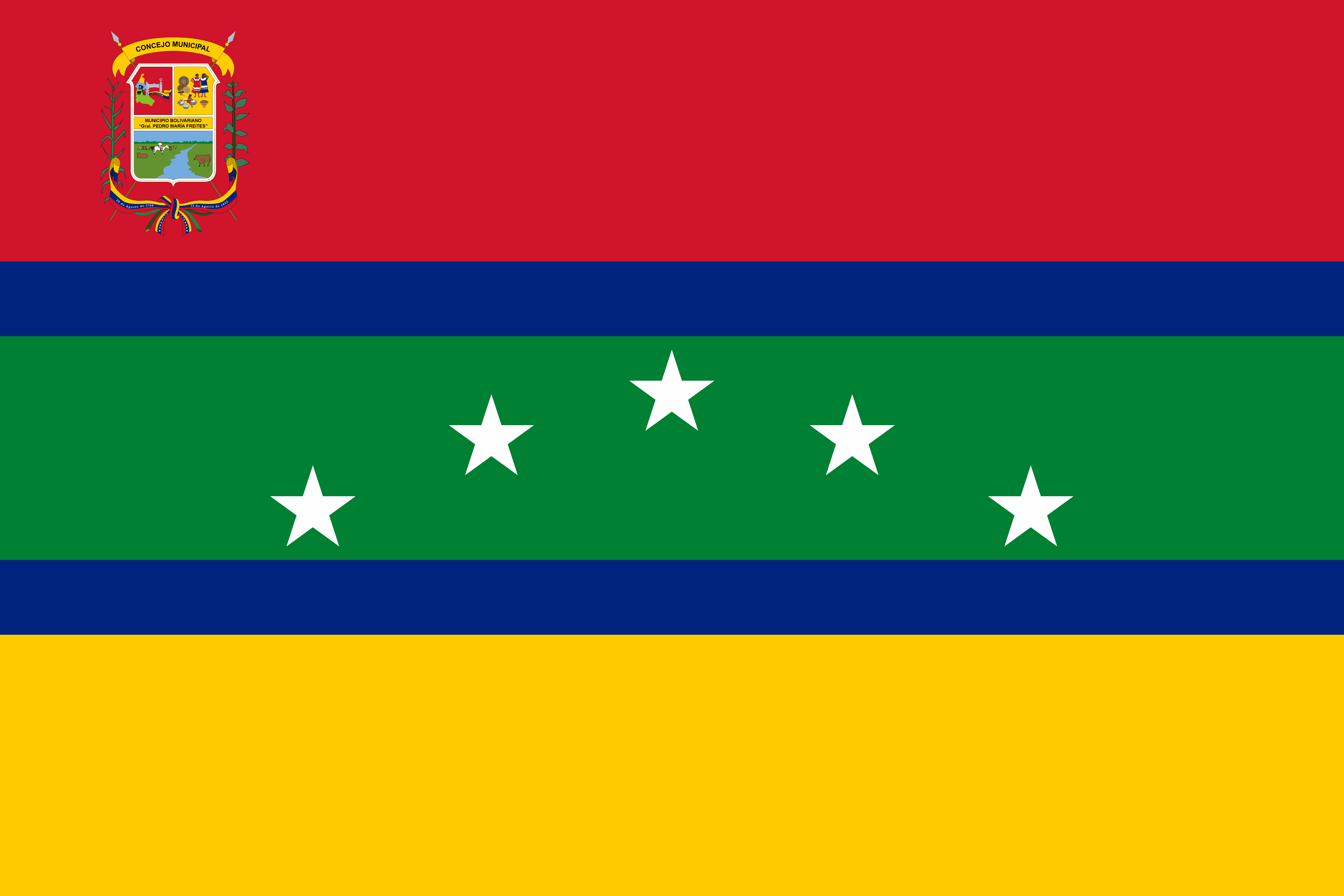
San Tomé

Santa Ana

Valle de Guanape

== Apure ==
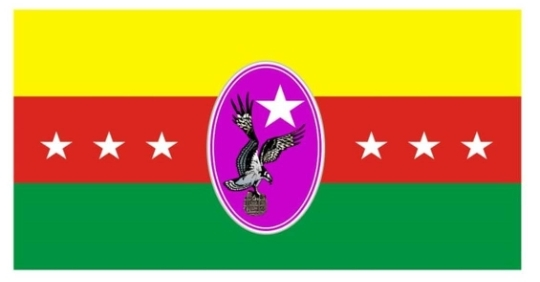
Achaguas

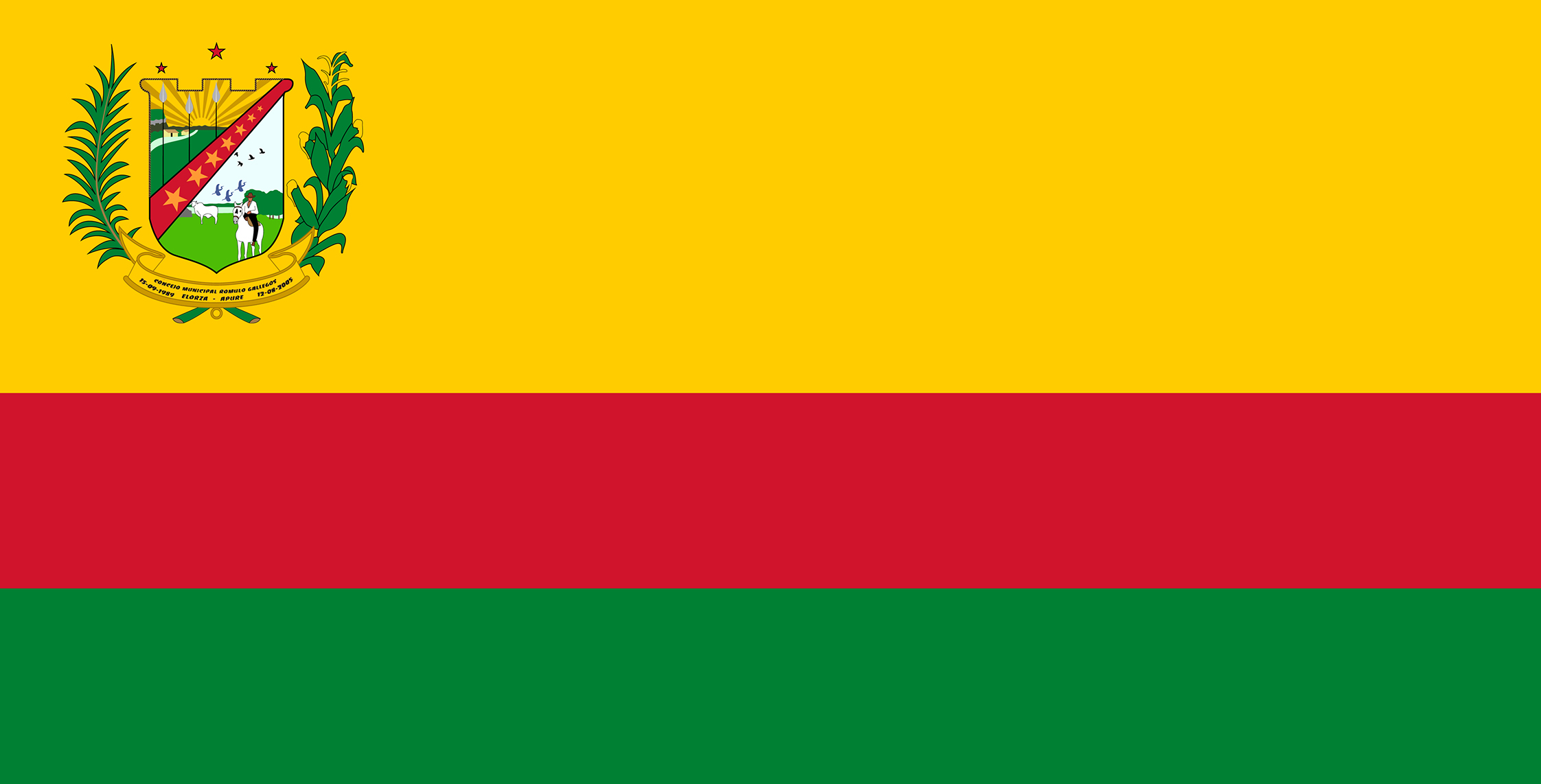
Elorza

== Aragua ==
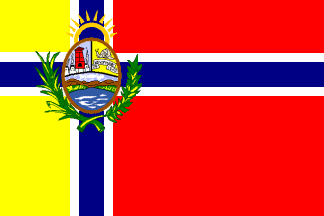
Cagua

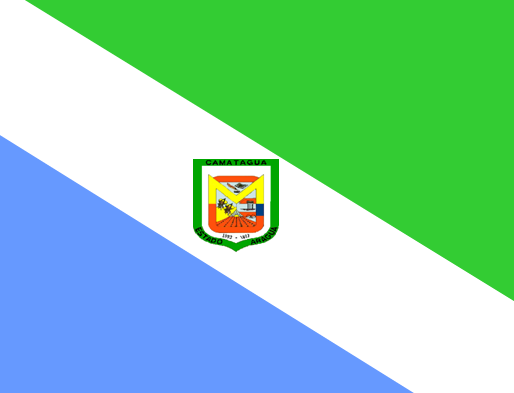
Camatagua

Colonia Tovar

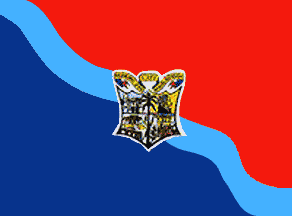
El Consejo

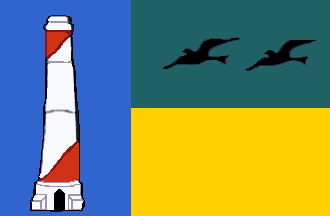
El Limón

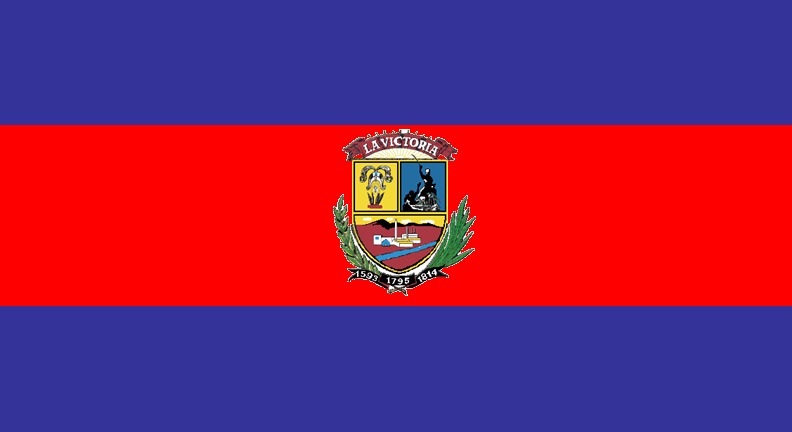
La Victoria

Maracay

Palo Negro

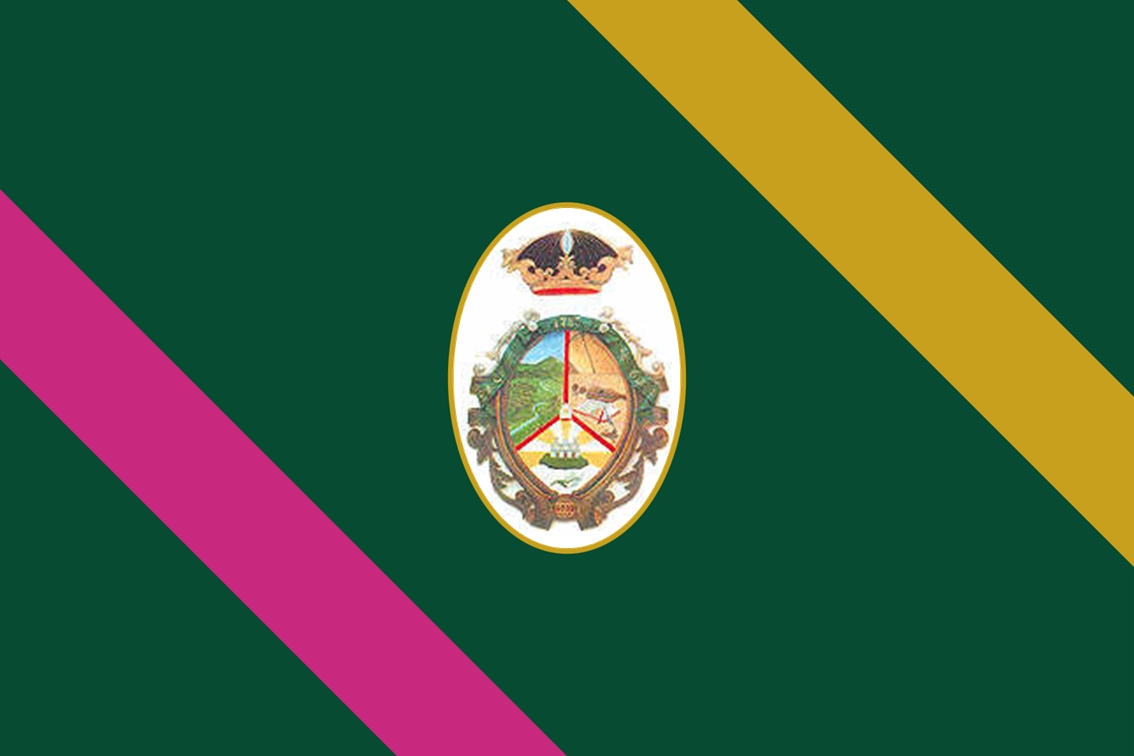
San Casimiro

San Mateo

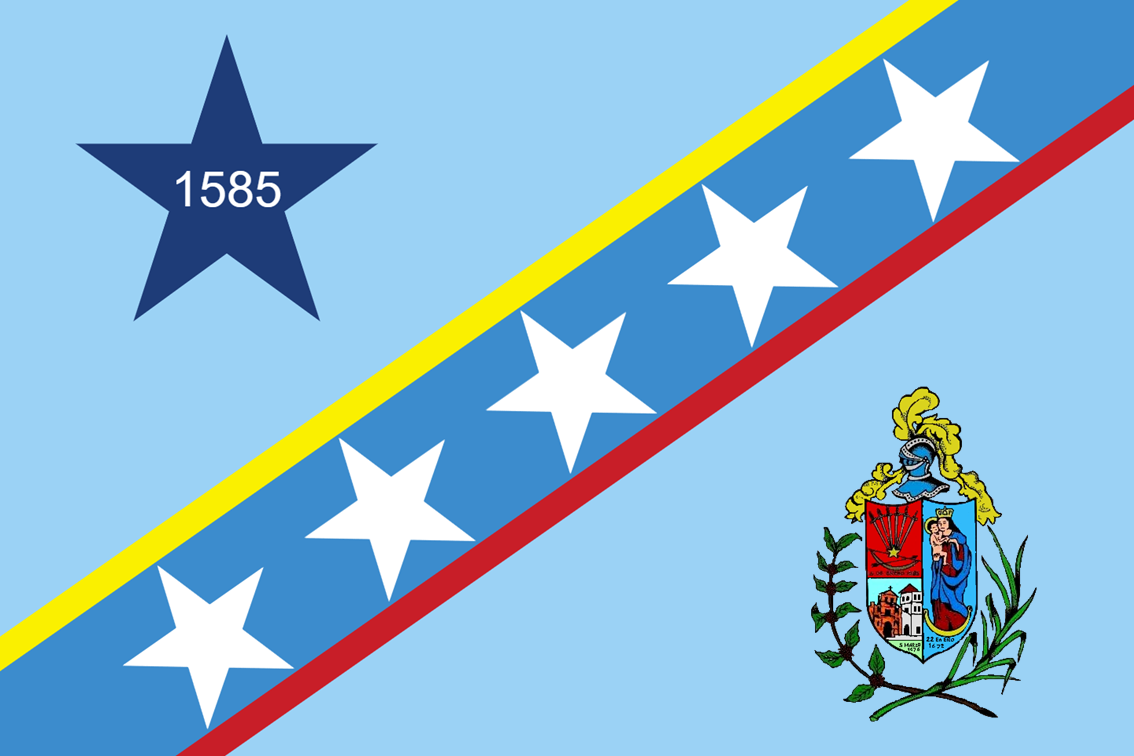
San Sebastián

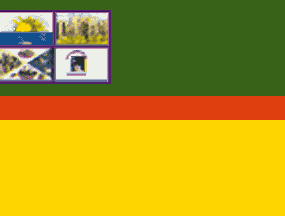
Santa Cruz

Santa Rita

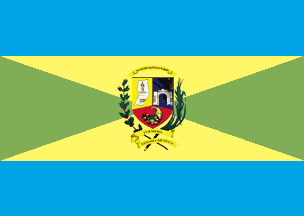
Turmero

== Barinas ==
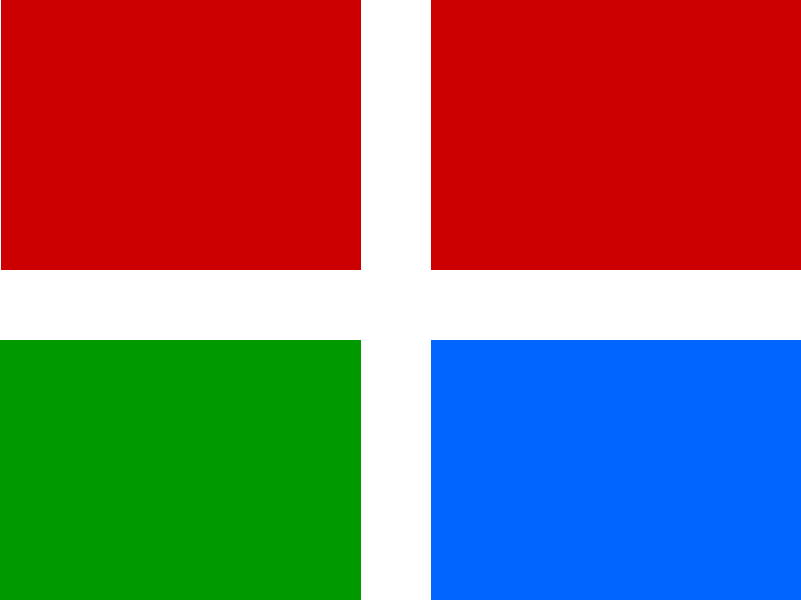
Barinas

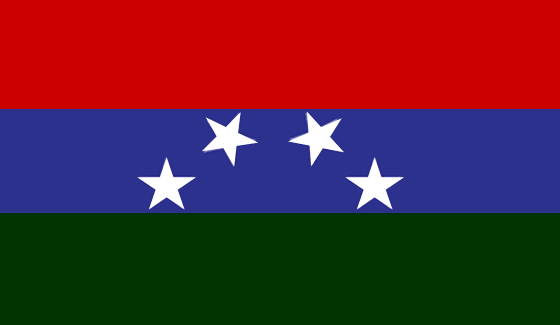
Ciudad Bolivia

== Bolívar ==
Ciudad Bolívar

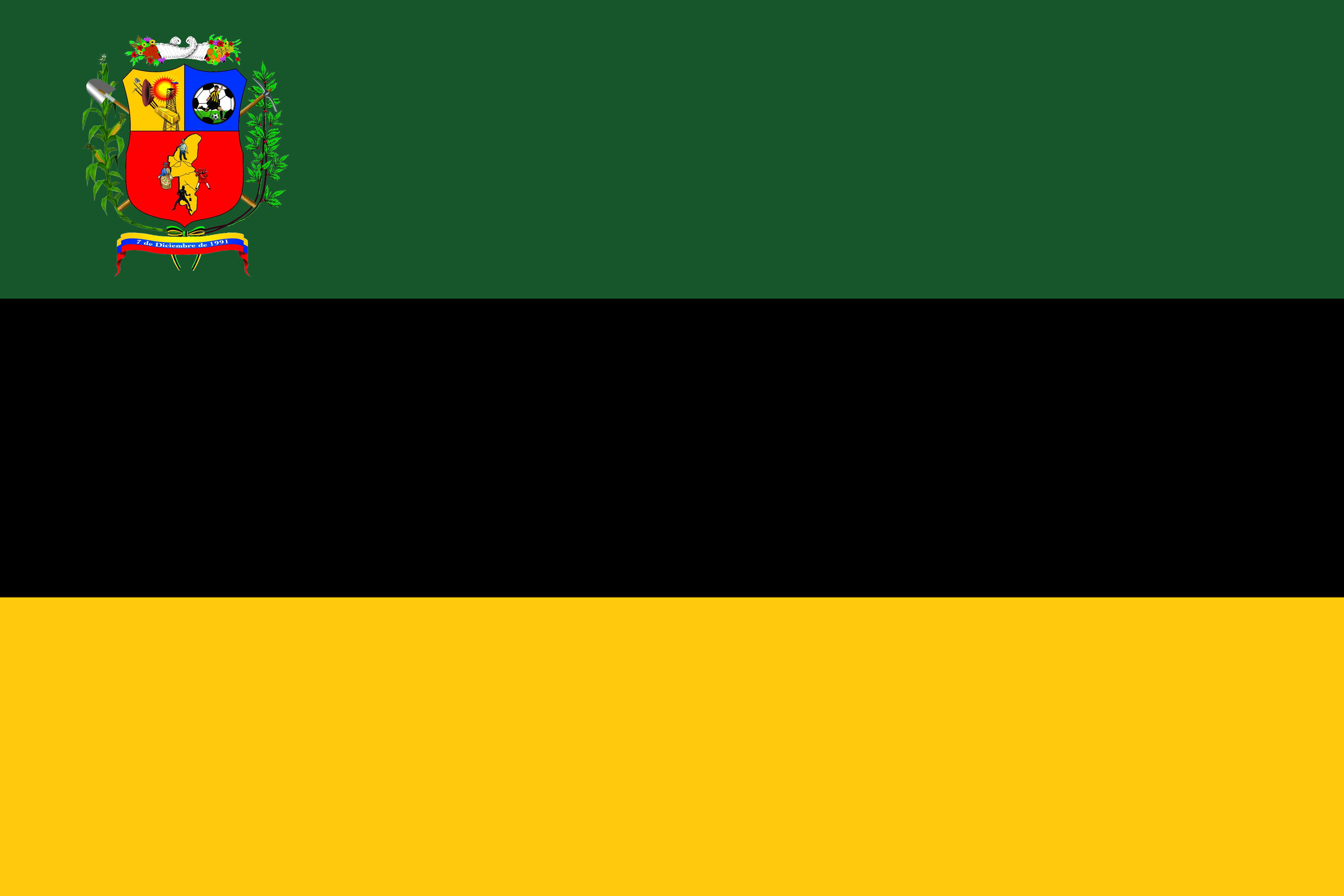
El Callao

Upata

== Carabobo ==
Bejuma

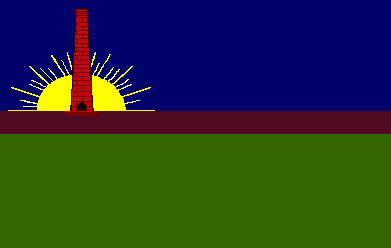
Mariara

Morón

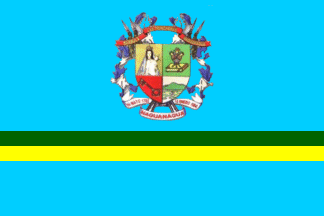
Naguanagua

San Diego

Valencia

== Cojedes ==
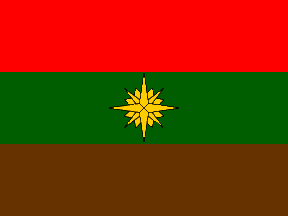
Las Vegas

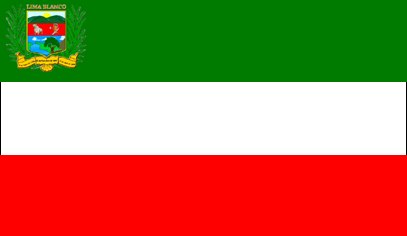
Macapo

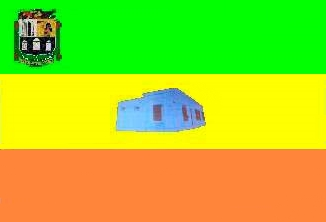
San Carlos

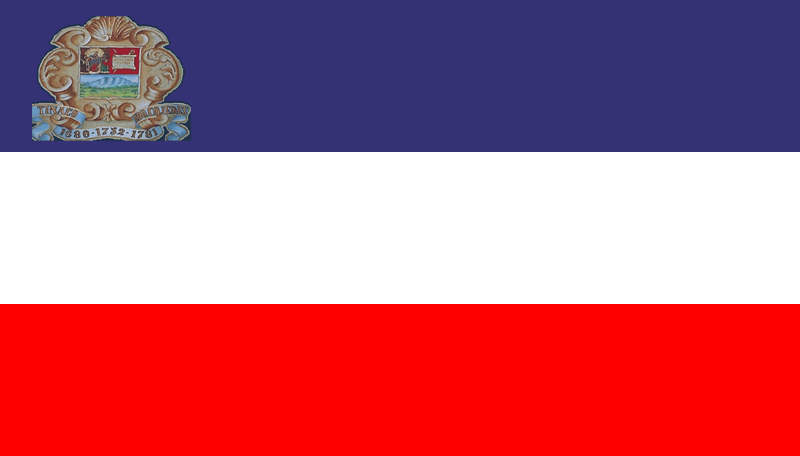
Tinaco

Tinaquillo

== Delta Amacuro ==
Pedernales

Tucupita

== Distrito Capital ==
Caracas (Current)

Caracas (1811-2022)

== Falcón ==
Catapárida

Churuguara

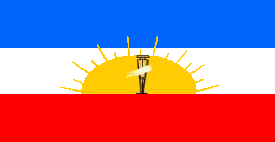
Dabajuro

Punto Fijo

Tucacas

== Guárico ==
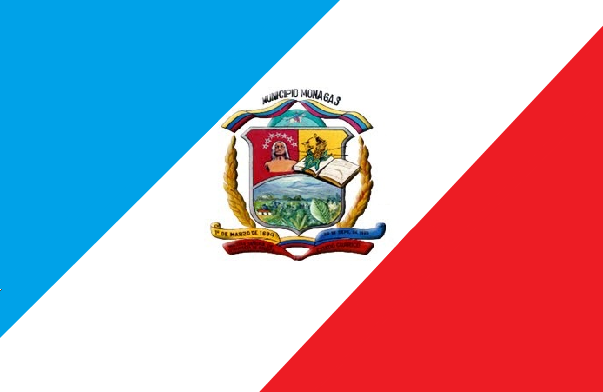
Altagracia de Orituco

Calabozo

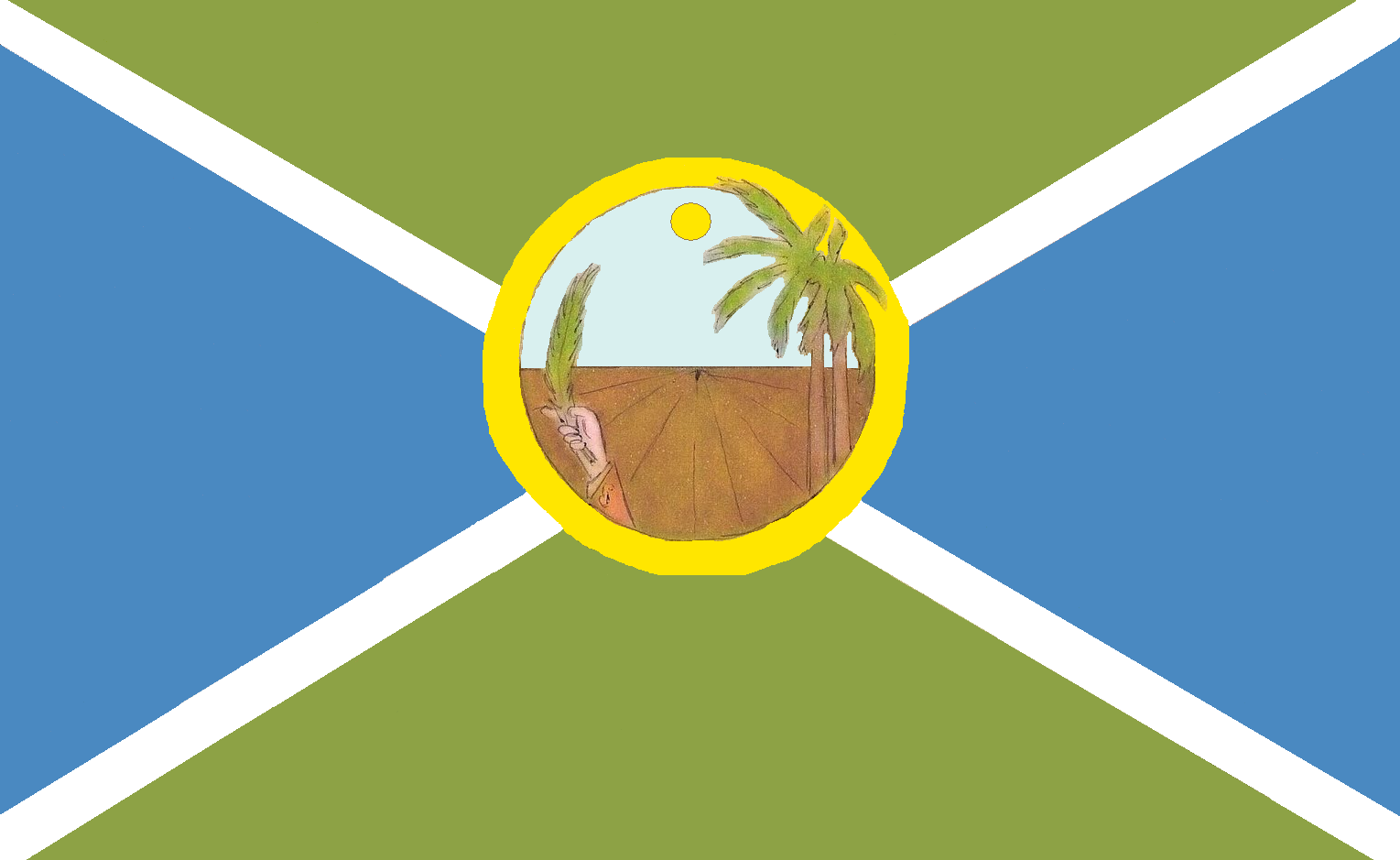
Chaguaramas

Valle de la Pascua

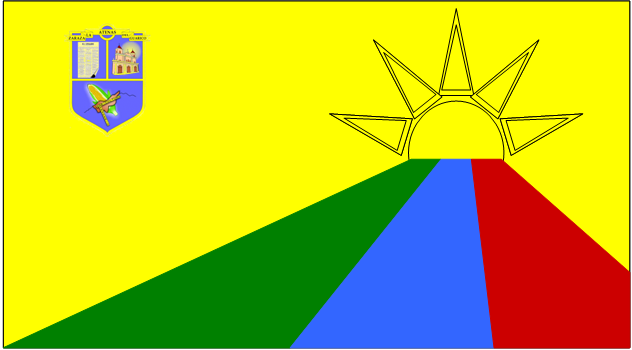
Zaraza

== Lara ==
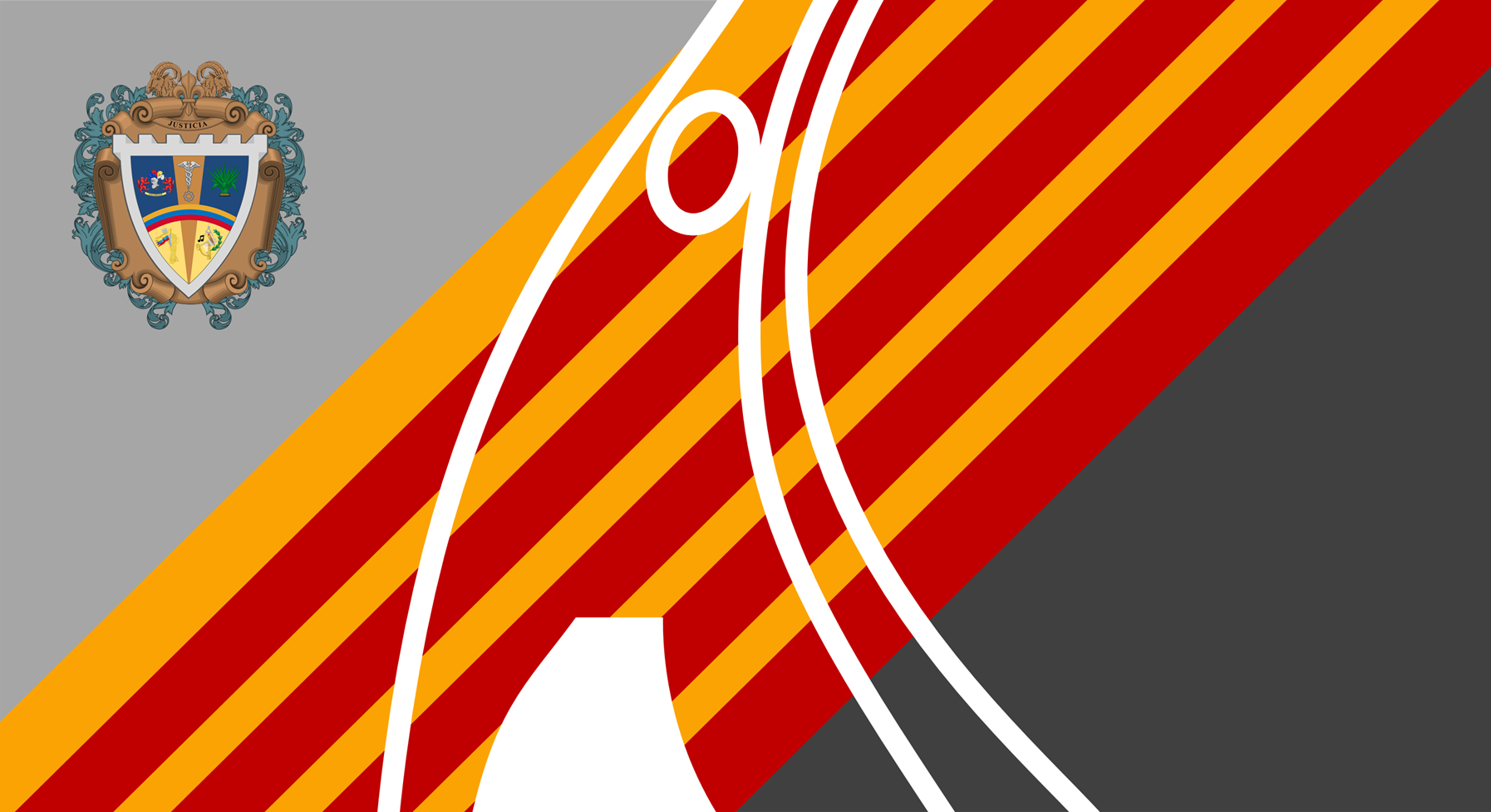
Barquisimeto

Cabudare

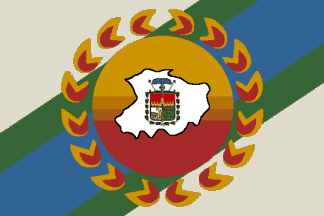
Carora

Duaca

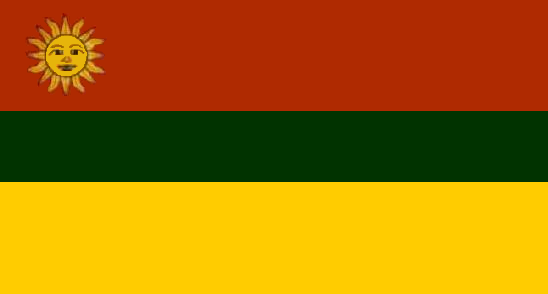
El Tocuyo

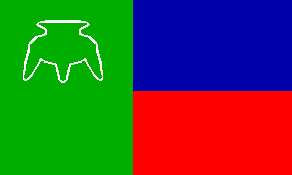
Quíbor

Siquisique

== Mérida ==
Bailadores

Ejido

El Vigía

Mérida

Mucuchíes

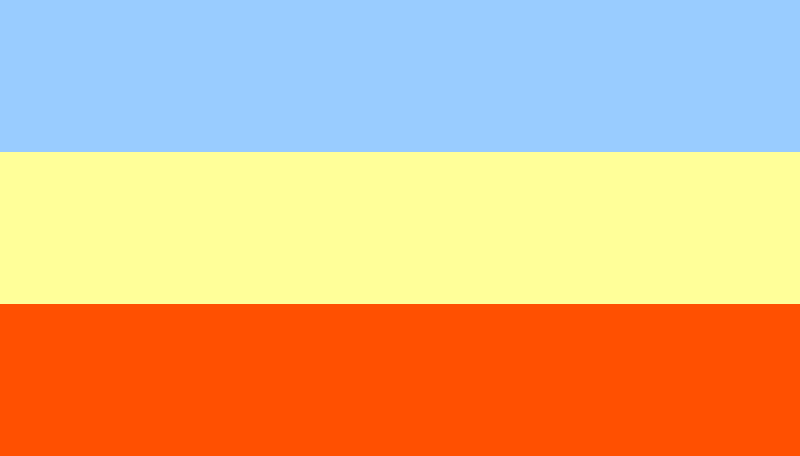
Santa Elena de Arenales

== Miranda ==
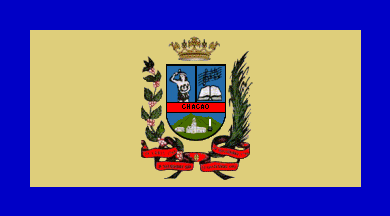
Chacao

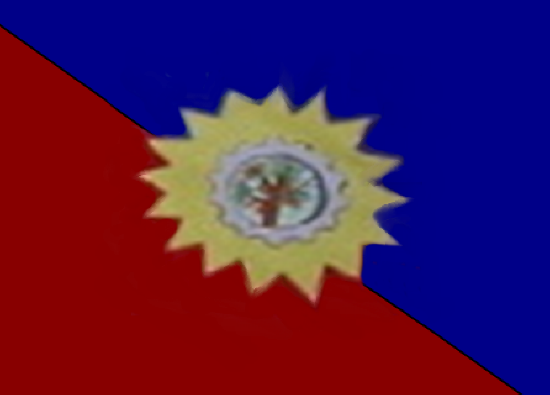
Cúa

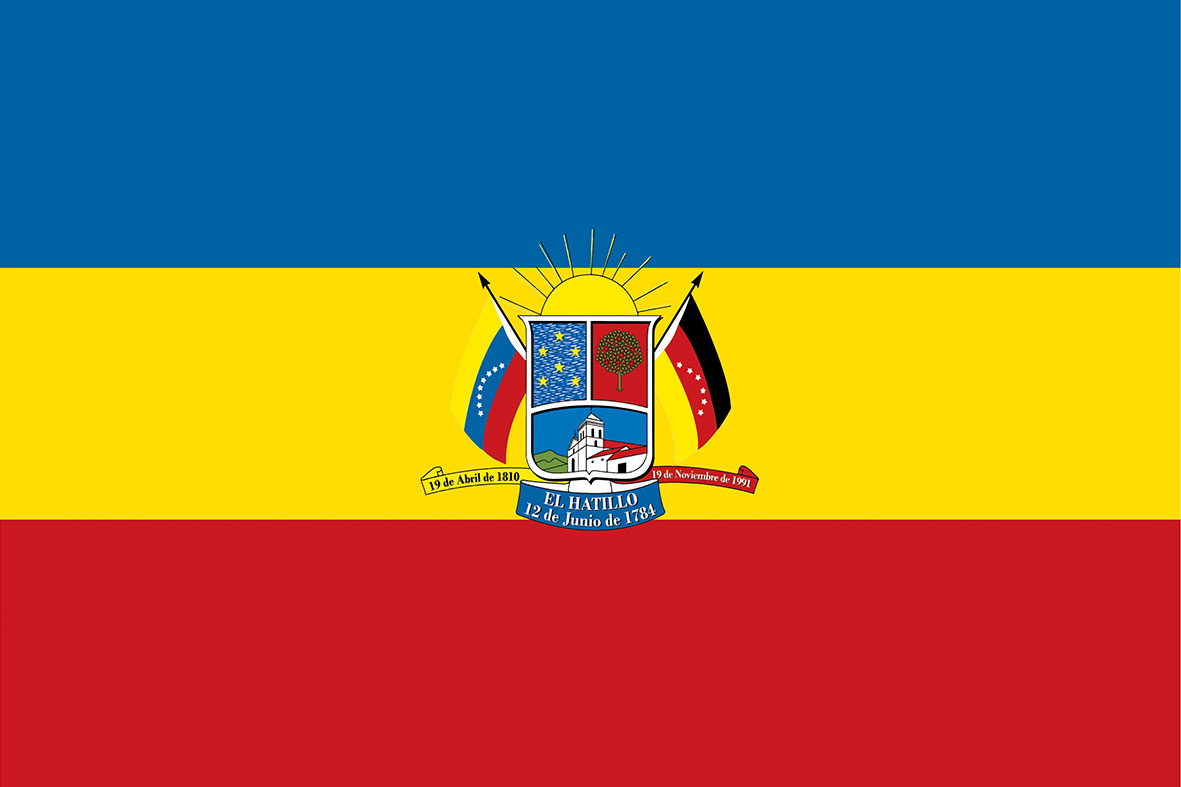
El Hatillo

Guatire

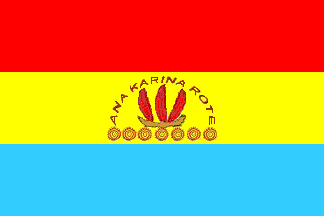
Los Teques

Petare

San Francisco de Yare

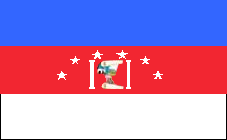
Santa Lucía

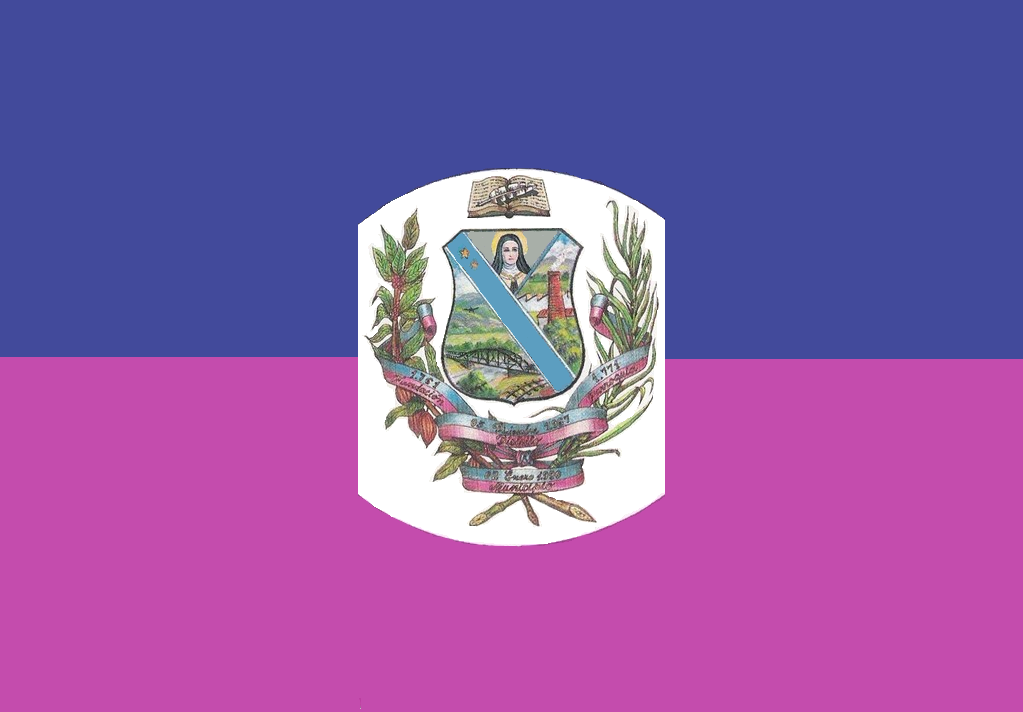
Santa Teresa del Tuy

== Monagas ==
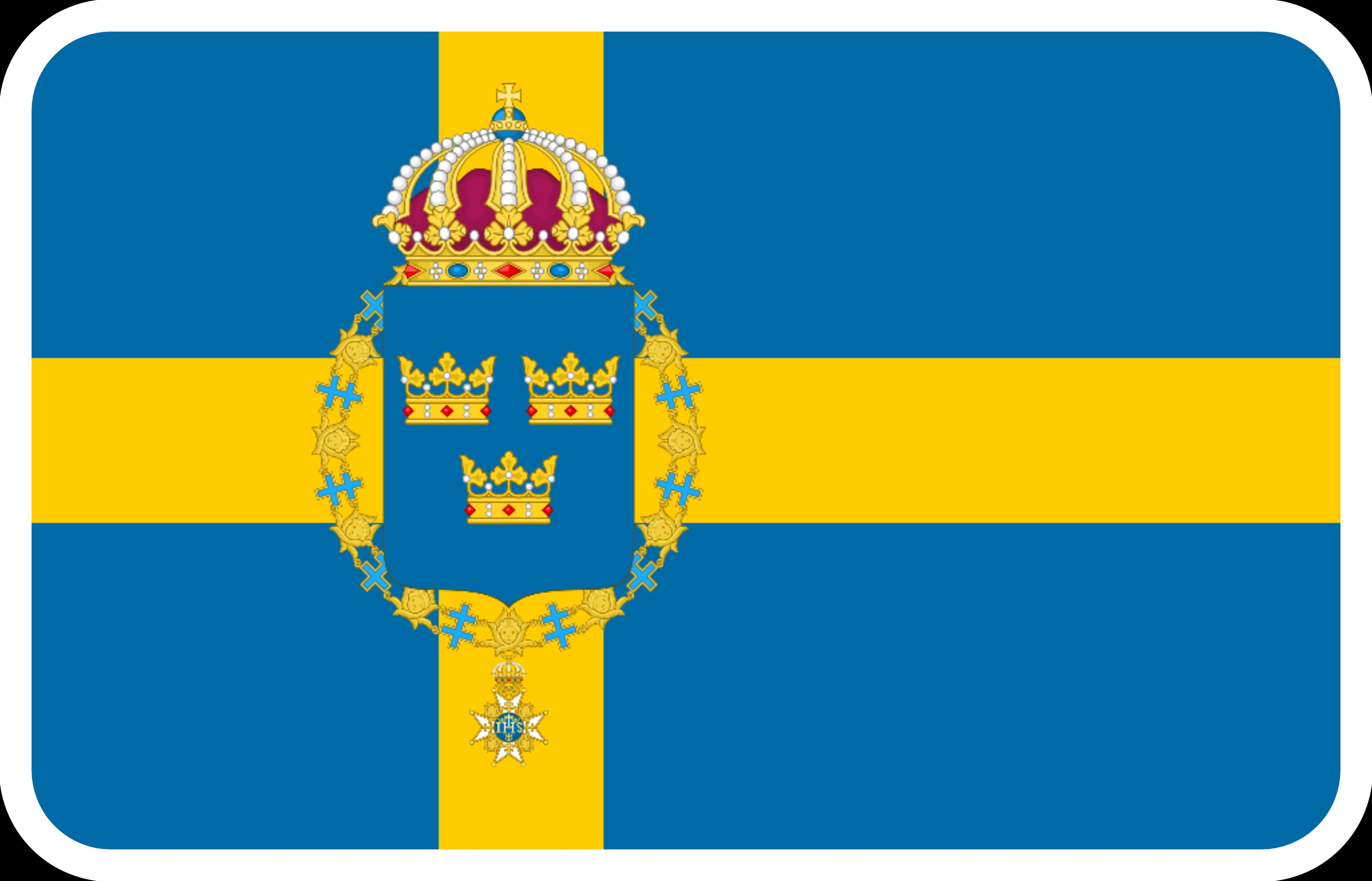
Caripito

Maturín

== Nueva Esparta ==
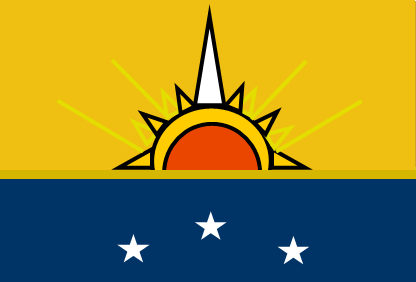
Juan Griego

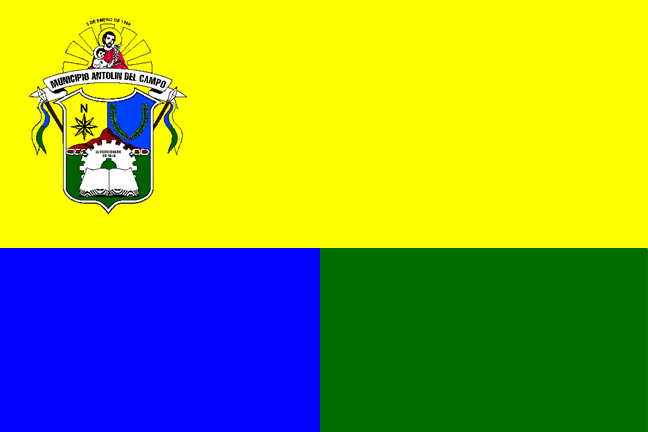
Paraguachí

== Portuguesa ==
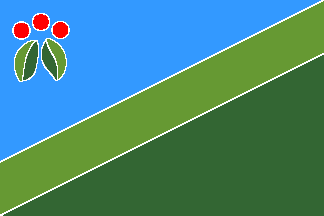
Biscucuy

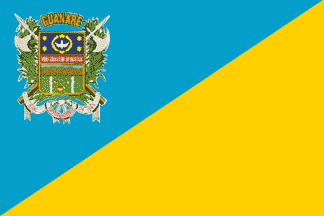
Guanare

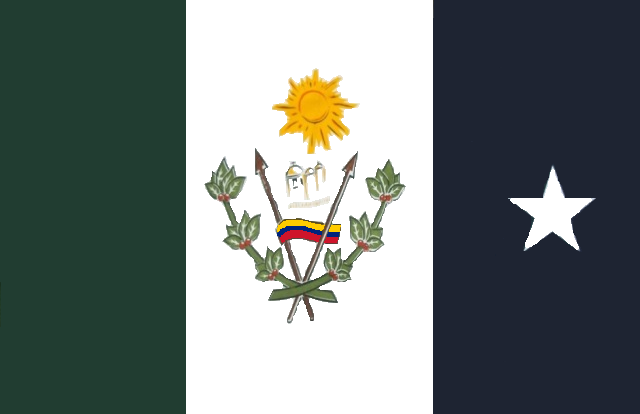
Ospino

== Sucre ==
Carúpano

== Táchira ==
Colón

Delicias

El Cobre

La Grita

Lobatera

Michelena

Palmira

Pregonero

Queniquea

Rubio

San Antonio del Táchira

San Cristóbal

Santa Ana del Táchira

Táriba

== Trujillo ==
Boconó

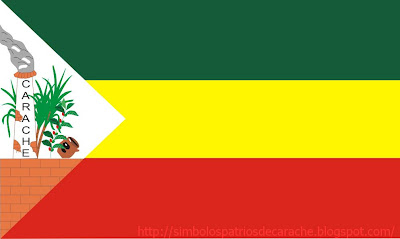
Carache

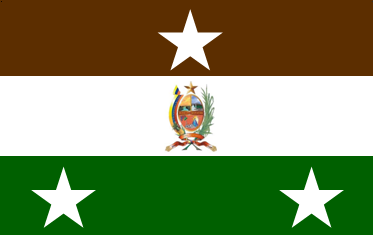
Motatán

Valera

== Vargas ==
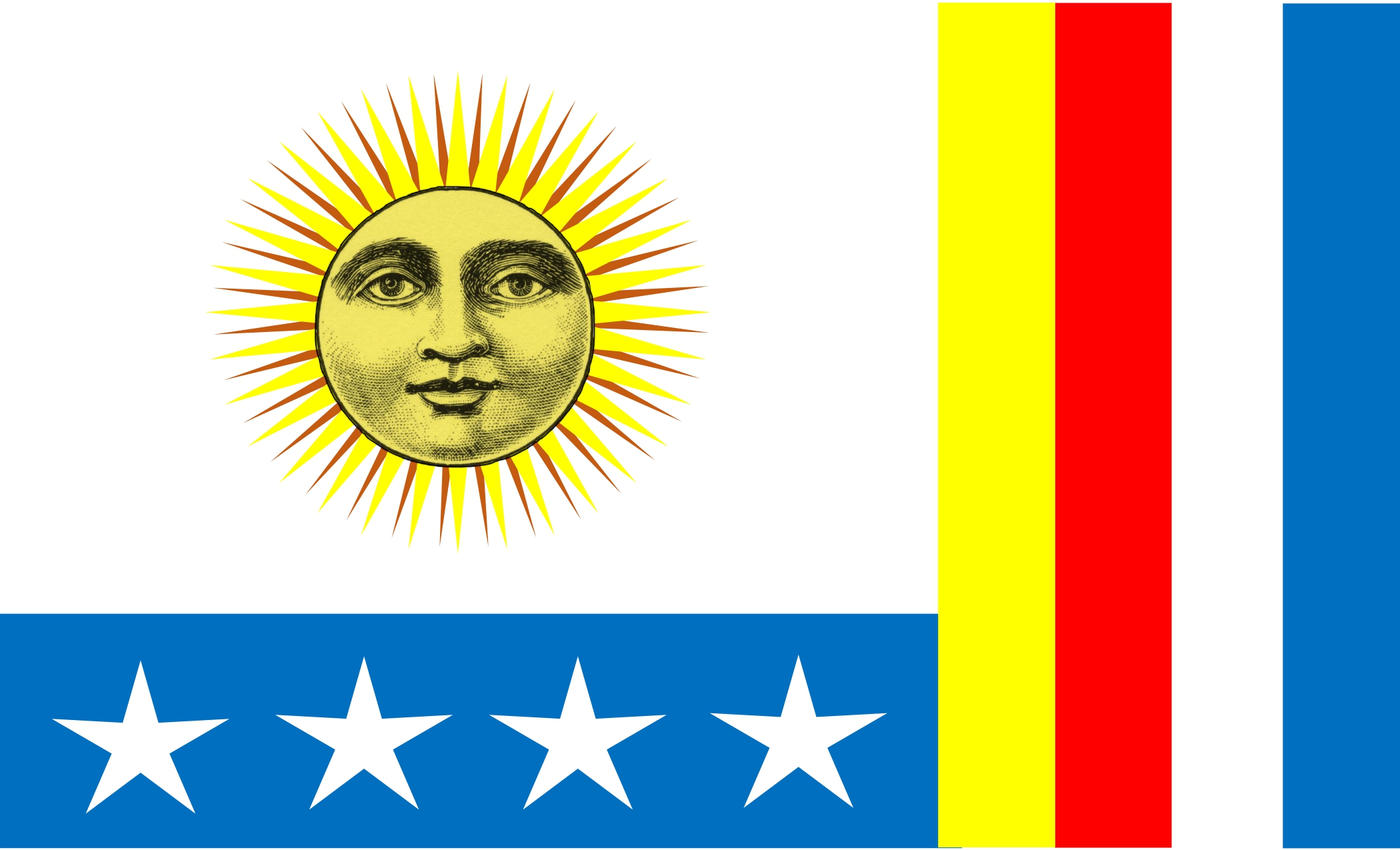
La Guaira

== Yaracuy ==
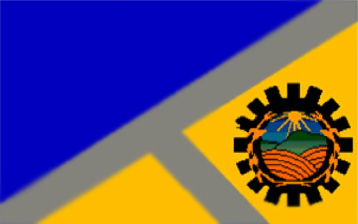
Chivacoa

Nirgua

== Zulia ==
Cabimas

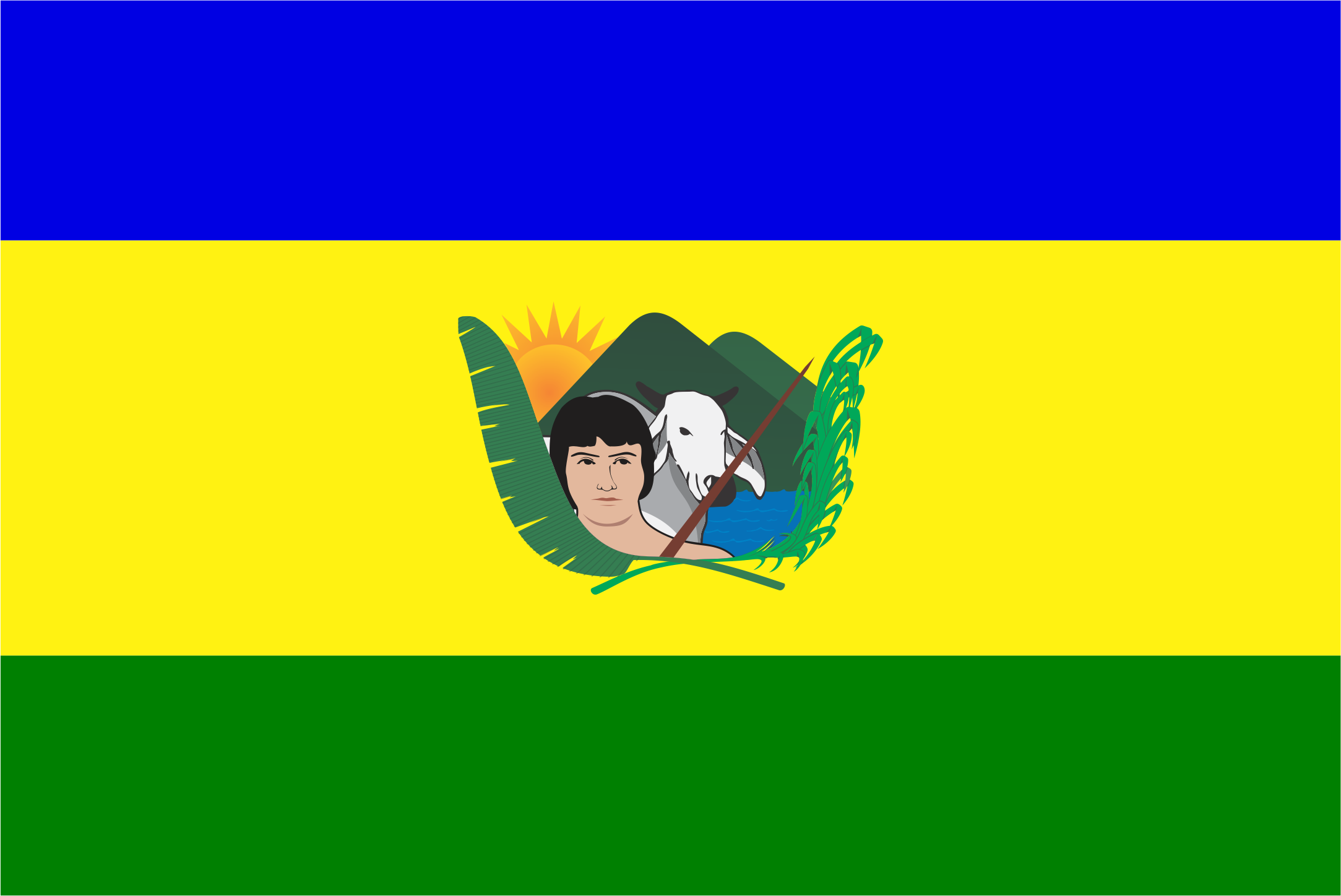
Machiques

Maracaibo

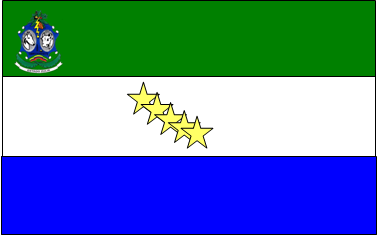
San Carlos del Zulia
