= Sucre, Sucre =

Sucre, Sucre may refer to:

- Sucre, Sucre Department, Colombia
- Sucre Municipality, Sucre, Venezuela
