= Espriella =

Espriella is a surname. Notable people with the surname include:

- Abelardo de la Espriella (born 1978), Colombian politician incoming President
- Juancho De la Espriella (born 1973), Colombian musician, interpreter of vallenato on the accordion
- Miguel de la Espriella (1947–2025), self-taught painter and sculptor from Sucre, Colombia
- Ricardo de la Espriella (born 1934), President of Panama from July 31, 1982, to February 13, 1984
