= Sucre Municipality =

Sucre Municipality may refer to:

Bolivia

- Sucre Municipality, Chuquisaca, Chuquisaca Department

Colombia

- Sucre, Cauca
- Sucre, Santander
- Sucre, Sucre Department

Venezuela

- Sucre Municipality, Aragua
- Sucre Municipality, Bolívar
- Sucre Municipality, Falcón
- Sucre Municipality, Mérida
- Sucre Municipality, Miranda
- Sucre Municipality, Portuguesa
- Sucre Municipality, Sucre State
- Sucre Municipality, Táchira
- Sucre Municipality, Trujillo
- Sucre Municipality, Yaracuy
- Sucre Municipality, Zulia

== See also ==
- Antonio José de Sucre Municipality, Barinas, Venezuela
- Sucre (disambiguation)
