= Maripa, Venezuela =

Coordinates: 7.4147°N 65.1900°W

Maripa
- Interactive map of Maripa
- Country: Venezuela
- State: Bolívar
- Municipality: Sucre Municipality

Population
  - Total: c 5,000
- Time zone: UTC−4 (VET)

Maripa is a town in the state of Bolívar, Venezuela. It is the municipal seat of the Sucre Municipality.

== See also ==
- List of cities and towns in Venezuela
