= Guillermo Sucre =

Venezuelan poet (1933–2021)

Guillermo Sucre Figarella (15 May 1933 – 22 July 2021) was a Venezuelan poet and literary critic born in Tumeremo in the state of Bolivar.

== Literary critic and academic ==
He translated into Spanish the works of André Breton, Saint-John Perse, William Carlos Williams, and Wallace Stevens.

In 1957 he founded the literary journal Sardío and an associated literary group. He began teaching at the Universidad Central de Venezuela in that same year. From 1968 until 1975 he lived in the United States, where he lectured at the University of Pittsburgh and became a member of Pitt's Instituto Internacional de Literatura Iberoamericana. Upon his return to Venezuela he taught at the Universidad Simón Bolívar and became literary director of the publishing house Monte Ávila Editores.

He won the National Prize for Literature in 1976 for his essay La máscara, la transparencia.

== Personal life ==
He was also a member of the Sucre family like his uncle Jose Antonio Ramos Sucre and his older brothers General Juan Manuel Sucre Figarella, and Senator Leopoldo Sucre Figarella.

== Notable works ==
- Borges, el poeta (1967)
- La máscara, la transparencia (1975)
- Mientras suceden los días (1961)
- La mirada (1970)
- En el verano cada palabra respira en el verano (1976)
- Serpiente breve (1977)
- La vastedad (1990)
