= Miguel de la Espriella =

Colombian artist (1947–2025)

Miguel de la Espriella ("Noble")
- Noble in 2006
- Born: Miguel Francisco de la Espriella Vergara; 14 November 1947; Caimito, Sucre, Colombia
- Died: 16 January 2025 (aged 77); Bogotá, Colombia
- Education: Self-taught
- Known for: Painting, sculpture
- Movement: Naïve, magical realism

Miguel de la Espriella (14 November 1947 – 16 January 2025), more commonly known by his artistic name, Noble, was a Colombian self-taught painter and sculptor from Sucre, whose art has been presented widely within his country and throughout the world.

Noble's work principally reflects the theme of nature that he experienced in the countryside while growing up on the Colombian coast.

The paintings for which he is best known are most often an integration of still lifes and landscapes with a strong "ethereal" presence related to the Latin American school of magic realism and reminiscent of the land in which Macondo, the imaginary town written about in "100 Years of Solitude" by García Márquez the winner of the 1982 Nobel Prize in Literature, could have been set. Indeed, it may be this essence to Noble's artwork that provoked Gabo to write about it when he said:

"There is in the painting of Miguel de la Espriella, "Noble", an explosion of light that comes from a background of shadows, the glare of the universe in the middle of a vegetable serfdom populated by birds and dragonflies. What makes an impact are his chiaroscuros with that essential validity that has always been present in Rembrandt. But in the concrete case of Noble it is not about imitation, but continuity, of a process that is forever in renewal and because of that, lasts. It is the survival of art and its real mode of expression while at the same time understanding it." [Published in the Colombian magazine FAMA (2000)]

Noble died in Bogotá on 16 January 2025, at the age of 77.

== Sculpture ==
Noble's bronze sculptures reflect more upon the normal cultural events that occur in Colombia, particularly those relating to the land and the life that is particular to that region of the world. His sculptures have covered events like coleo´s or "corralejas" - events native to where he grew up on the Colombian coast.

== Signature ==
Noble signed his artwork with a caricature or logo representing his artistic name.

== See also ==
- Colombian diaspora

== Sources ==
- "Noble" (2000), FAMA
- Latina News (Jan. 2005) References in Spanish
- El Meridiano de Cordoba (Mar 11 2007) Ref. in Spanish
- website link Sculptures
- Convenio Andrés Bello Exhibition
- Article on "Noble" the artist Article
- List (in Spanish) of top 50 Colombian Artists Top 50 Colombian Artists (in Spanish)
- Miguel de la Espriella Beijing Art Exhibit - Olympics 2008
- Press Release (Spanish)
