= José Manuel Sucre =

Venezuelan politician (1963–2016)

José Manuel Sucre Ciffoni (November 1, 1963–March 25, 2016) was a Venezuelan politician and United Nations official who was based in the United States of America in the later part of his life. He was a member of the Acción Democrática (AD) party and of Venezuela's prominent Sucre family.

== Early life and career ==
Sucre was born in Caracas, Venezuela, the son of parliamentarian Juan Manuel Sucre Trias. He received a law degree from Andrés Bello Catholic University.

== Politician ==
Sucre was elected to the National Assembly of Venezuela in the 1988 Venezuelan general election, which was won by Democratic Action, for a constituency in Ciudad Bolívar. He took office in January 1989. In 1991, he was appointed as secretary to Venezuelan president Carlos Andrés Pérez. He was defeated by a candidate of the left-wing party La Causa Radical (LCR) in the 1993 general election, in which Acción Democrática lost much of its support.

== United Nations Official ==
Sucre moved to the United States following his defeat in the 1993 election and earned a post-graduate degree in law and public administration from Columbia University. He ultimately settled in Darien, Connecticut.

He was appointed to an advisor position at the United Nations in 1994. He was appointed as interim mayor of Peja by the United Nations Interim Administration Mission in Kosovo (UNMIK) in 1999 and held this role until 2001. Sucre later described his appointment to this position as one of his proudest moments. He later worked an advisor on governance systems and institutions. In 2008, he promoted an international youth development project based on an initiative of the Odebrecht Foundation in Bahia, Brazil. A 2013 news report identified him as programme manager of the Latin American and East Europe Programme of the Division for Public Administration and Development Management (DPADM).

== Death ==
Sucre died on November 1, 2016.

== Electoral record ==
=== National Assembly of Venezuela ===
1993 Venezuelan Chamber of Deputies election: Bolivar I
Candidate	Party	Votes	%
Jorge Reyes	La Causa Radical	16,460	41.34
Jose Manuel Sucre (incumbent)	Acción Democrática–GP	10,760	27.02
Victor Abad M.	COPEI	6,818	17.12
Aquiles Acosta	Convergencia–Movimiento al Socialismo–Unión Republicana Democrática–MAP–UVI–Organización Nacionalista Democrática Activa (ONDA)–Partido Nacionalista (PN)–Frente Unido Nacionalista (FUN)–Frente de Integración Nacional (FIN)	3,945	9.91
Juan R. Gonzalez	Organización Renovadora Auténtica	552	1.39
Martin S. Carrillo	Avanzada Popular (AP)—Nueva Generación Democrática (NGD)—Movimiento Renovación Nacional (MRN)	291	0.73
Luis Vicente Perez	Fuerza Popular Independiente (FPI)	251	0.63
Omar Rodriguez	MR–FI	188	0.47
Angel A. Pinto H.	Movimiento por la Democracia Popular (MDP)	161	0.40
Hermes Guzman V.	Movimiento Integral Democrático (MID)–Movimiento Electoral del Pueblo (MEP)–U–MICA	125	0.31
Rafael E. Jimenez	PINDD–Cruzada Cívica Nacionalista (CCN)	68	0.17
Sergio Del Nogal	Communist Party of Venezuela	68	0.17
Jose Felipe Montes	PCI–MINERO	46	0.12
Angel C. Marin R.	Opinión Nacional (OPINA)	33	0.08
Angel Pinto R.	CRA	21	0.05
Argenis Ortiz J.	LS	13	0.03
Elias Escorihuela	Unión Patriótica (UP)	8	0.02
Carlos Piñango	Poder Organizado Democrático de Estructura Renovadora (PODER)	8	0.02
Total		39,816	100.00
Source: Distribution of votes among candidates with multiple endorsements: Jose Manuel Sucre (Acción Democrática: 10395, GP: 365); Aquiles Acosta (National Convergence: 2615, Movement for Socialism: 921, Democratic Republican Union: 125, MAP: 93, UVI: 89, ONDA: 41, PN: 23, FUN: 20, FIN: 18); Martin S. Carrillo (AP: 216, NGD: 45, MRN: 30); Omar Rodriguez (MR: 134, FI: 54); Hermes Guzman V. (MID: 49, MEP: 40, U: 28, MICA: 8); Rafael E. Jimenez (PINDD: 44, CCN: 24); Jose Felipe Montes (PCI: 33, MINERO: 13)
