= Sucre Municipality, Bolívar =

Sucre Municipality Municipio Sucre
- Municipality
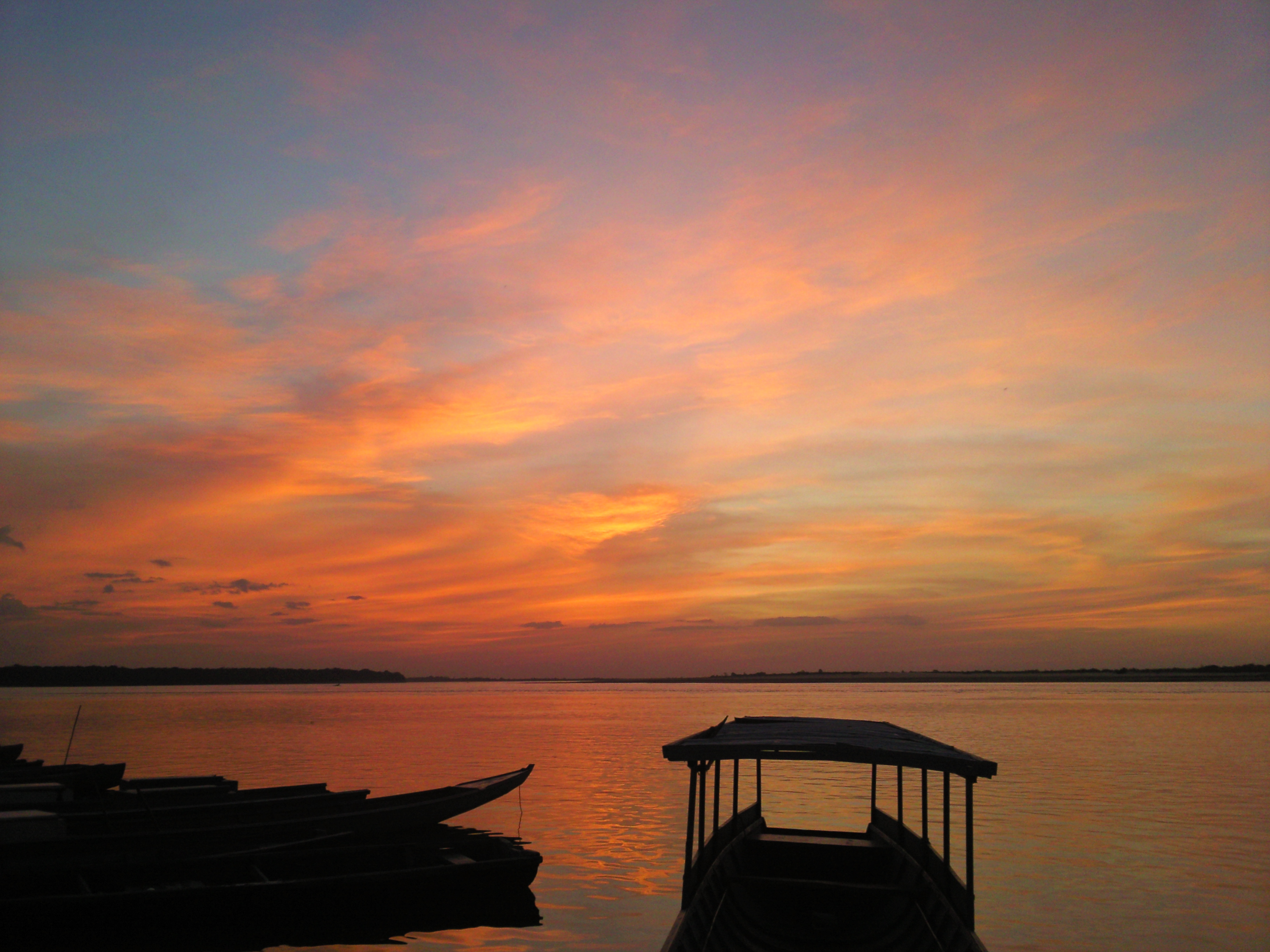

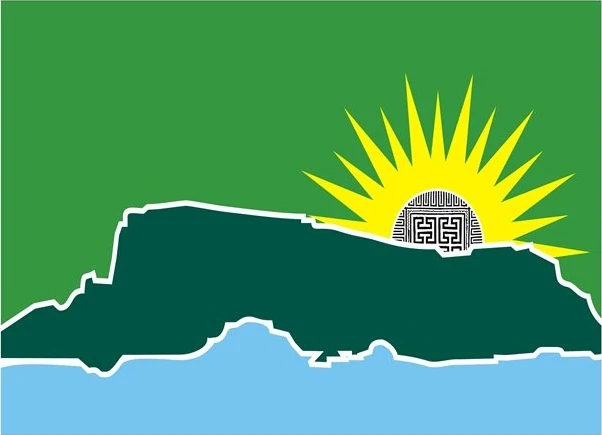
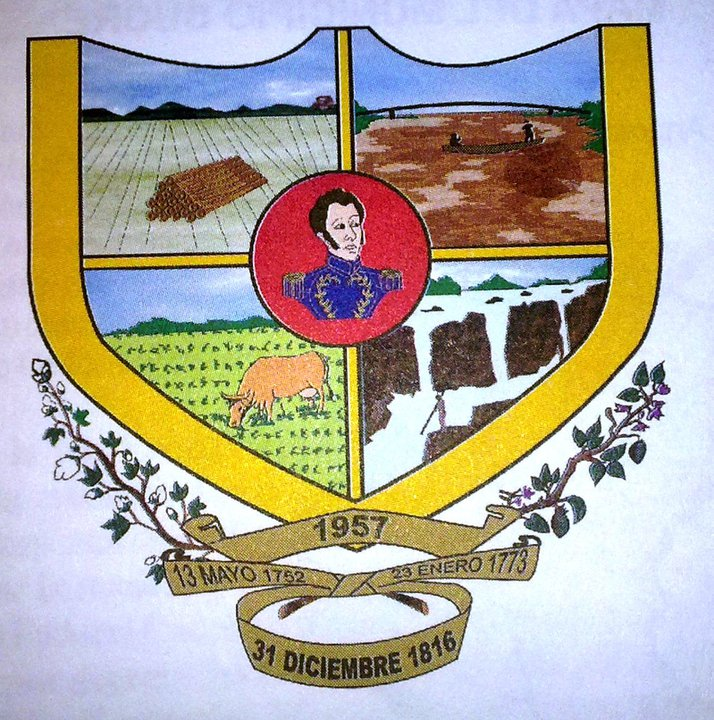
- Flag Coat of arms

- Location in Bolívar

- Location in Venezuela
- Coordinates: 5°58′04″N 64°19′50″W
- Country: Venezuela
- State: Bolívar
- Municipal seat: Maripa

Government
  - Mayor: Julio Cedeño Pérez (PSUV)

Area
  - Total: 49,006.3 km^{2} (18,921.4 sq mi)

Population (2011)
  - Total: 20,359
  - Density: 0.41544/km^{2} (1.0760/sq mi)
- Time zone: UTC−4 (VET)
- Area code(s): 0285
- Website: Official website

Sucre is one of the 11 municipalities (municipios) that makes up the Venezuelan state of Bolívar and, according to the 2011 census by the National Institute of Statistics of Venezuela, the municipality has a population of 20,359. The town of Maripa is the shire town of the Sucre Municipality.

== Name ==
The municipality is one of several in Venezuela named "Sucre Municipality" in honour of Venezuelan independence hero Antonio José de Sucre.

== Demographics ==
The Sucre Municipality, according to a 2007 population estimate by the National Institute of Statistics of Venezuela, has a population of 27,218 (up from 20,108 in 2000). This amounts to 1.8% of the state's population. The municipality's population density is 0.59 inhabitants per square kilometre (1.5/sq mi).

== Government ==
The mayor of the Sucre Municipality is Juan Carlos Figarella Díaz, re-elected on October 31, 2004, with 47% of the vote. The municipality is divided into four (five if you count the Capital Sucre section) parishes; Aripao, Guarataro, Las Majadas, and Moitaco.
