= Queniquea =

- Coat of arms

- Location within Venezuela
- Coordinates: 7°55′N 72°01′W
- Time zone: UTC−4 (VET)

Queniquea is a town in Táchira, Venezuela. It is the capital of Sucre Municipality. It has a population of 20,000.

== See also ==
- Municipalities of Venezuela
