= Luis Alberto Sucre =

Luis Alberto Sucre (1865–1942), a member of the Sucre family, was a well-known Venezuelan historian.

The main focus of his research was based upon the genealogy and heraldry of the families of Simón Bolívar and of his relative Antonio José de Sucre. He was also the first Curator of the Bolivarian Museum of Caracas and a member of the National History Academy between 1928 and 1942. His works include Gobernadores y capitanes generolles de Venezuela (1928; reprinted 1964).
