= Sucre Municipality, Aragua =

Sucre Municipality Municipio Sucre
- Municipality
- Flag Coat of arms
- Anthem: Anthem of the Sucre Municipality
- Location in Aragua

- Location in Venezuela
- Coordinates: 10°09′17″N 67°26′48″W
- Country: Venezuela
- State: Aragua
- Municipal seat: Cagua

Government
  - Mayor: Wilson Coy (PSUV)

Area
  - Total: 62.5 km^{2} (24.1 sq mi)

Population (2011)
  - Total: 114,509
  - Density: 1,830/km^{2} (4,750/sq mi)
- Time zone: UTC−4 (VET)
- Area code(s): 0244
- Website: Official website

Sucre Municipality is one of the 18 municipalities (municipios) that makes up the Venezuelan state of Aragua and, according to the 2011 census by the National Institute of Statistics of Venezuela, the municipality has a population of 114,509. The town of Cagua is the shire town of the Sucre Municipality.

== Name ==
The municipality is one of several in Venezuela named "Sucre Municipality" in honour of Venezuelan independence hero Antonio José de Sucre.

== History ==
The town of Cagua was first established as Cagua la Vieja in 1620 and was originally made up of Spaniards. The origin of the name Cagua, comes from the native word Cahiua, which means snail. Cagua was rebuilt in its current location in 1622 under the new name of Nuestra Señora del Rosario de Cagua, which was later changed to San Jose de Cagua during the 18th century. The city is now known as just Cagua.

Cagua is a small city with several squares and has a tropical climate. It's ones of the most important cities of Aragua because of its proximity to Maracay, the state capital and Caracas. Cagua has been, for a long time, an important industrial zone.

One of its most important places are Casa Guipuzcoana and the Mountain "El Empalado", where original natives were burned alive by Spanish colonizers; this mountain is rich in marble and typical plants such as Araguaney, Samán, Bucare, and Apamate.

== Sites of interest ==
- Sucre square
- Casa Guipuzcoana
- Marble Mines
- Empalado Mountain
- Old Mill
- Saint Joseph Church
- Taiguaiguay Lake

== Demographics ==
The Sucre Municipality, according to a 2007 population estimate by the National Institute of Statistics of Venezuela, has a population of 120,302 (up from 109,723 in 2000). This amounts to 7.2% of the state's population. The municipality's population density is 1,582.92 inhabitants per square kilometre (4,099.7/sq mi).

== Government ==
The mayor of the Sucre Municipality is Wilson Coy, elected on November 21, 2021, with 39.58% of the vote. He replaced Miriam Pardo shortly after the elections. The municipality is divided into two parishes; Capital Sucre and Bella Vista.
