= José Antonio Ramos Sucre =

Venezuelan writer (1890–1930)

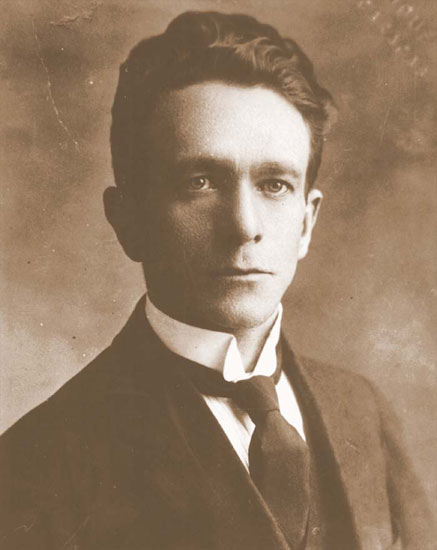
- Born: 9 June 1890; Cumaná, Venezuela
- Died: June 13, 1930 (aged 40); Geneva, Switzerland
- Occupations: poet, writer

José Antonio Ramos Sucre (Cumaná, 9 June 1890 – Geneva, 13 June 1930) was a Venezuelan poet, professor, diplomat and scholar. He was a member of the Sucre family of Venezuela and the great-great-nephew of Antonio José de Sucre. He was educated at the Colegio Nacional, and then at the Universidad Central de Venezuela where he studied Law, Letters and Languages (ancient and modern Greek and Sanskrit).

== Non Literary Career ==
Upon finishing his studies, and becoming proficient in Portuguese, Latin, Danish, English, French, German, Italian and Swedish, he worked as a translator and interpreter at the Ministry of Foreign Affairs of Venezuela and later as Consul to Geneva where he died in 1930. At the same time, Ramos Sucre served as a Professor of World History, World Geography, History & Geography of Venezuela, Latin and Greek. He also briefly worked as a Civil Court judge.

== Poetry and Works ==
He is best remembered however for his work in poetry and literature, amongst them:

- Trizas de papel (1921)
- Sobre las huellas de Humboldt (1923)
- La torre de Timón (1925)
- Las formas del fuego (1929)
- El cielo de esmalte (1929)

In 1956, the Venezuelan Ministry of Education published his work in the collection Biblioteca Popular Venezolana, and in the 1960s he would become to the new generations one of the most valid references for excellence. He is remembered as "the poet of pain, a poet who felt a hypnotic fascination for the obscure and the abyss, a poet that suffers in his loneliness", according to the Venezuelan poet and literary critic Francisco Pérez Perdomo.

== Honors ==
To honor his memory, the University of Salamanca, created the José Antonio Ramos Sucre Professorship of Venezuelan Literature and in 1999, the Fondo de Cultura Económica de México published the book Obra Poética, comprising his poetic works, with a prologue by his cousin Guillermo Sucre. His collected writings are also available in Obra completa, edited by José Ramón Medina (Caracas: Fundación Biblioteca Ayacucho, 1989) and Obra poética: Edición crítica, edited by Alba Rosa Hernández Bossio (Paris: UNESCO/Colección Archivos, 2001).

In 2006, Venezuelan novelist Rubi Guerra was awarded the Premio de Novela Corta Rufino Blanco Fombona for his novella based on Ramos Sucre's final months in Europe, La tarea del testigo (Caracas: Fundación Editorial El perro y la rana, 2007). A second edition of La tarea del testigo was published in 2012 by Lugar Común in Caracas.

An English translation of his poetry appeared in 2012 under the title José Antonio Ramos Sucre: Selected Works, selected and translated by Guillermo Parra and published by the University of New Orleans Press.

== Translations ==
=== English ===
- José Antonio Ramos Sucre: Selected Works, translated by Guillermo Parra (New Orleans, LA: University of New Orleans Press, 2012). ISBN 978-1-60801-090-5
- José Antonio Ramos Sucre. Selected Works: expanded edition , translated by Guillermo Parra (Las Cruces, NM: Noemi Press, 2016). ISBN 978-1-93481-962-3
- José Antonio Ramos Sucre, From the Livid Country, translated by Guillermo Parra (San Francisco, CA: Auguste Press, 2012).

=== Other languages ===
==== French ====
- José Antonio Ramos Sucre, Le chant inquiet. El canto anhelante, tr. François Migeot, (Caracas, Venezuela: Monte Ávila Editores/Massif Jurassien, France: L’Atelier du Grand Tétras, 2009).

==== Portuguese ====
- As formas do fogo, anthology, bilingual edition, selected and translated by José Bento, Eugenio Montejo, forewords. Venezuelan Embassy, Lisbon, Publicações Dom Quixote, 1992, oclc 768341268.
- O mensageiro/El mensajero, Floriano Martins (trans.), (n.t.) Revista Literária em Tradução, nº 1 (set/2010), Fpolis/Brasil, ISSN 2177-5141
