= Cagua =

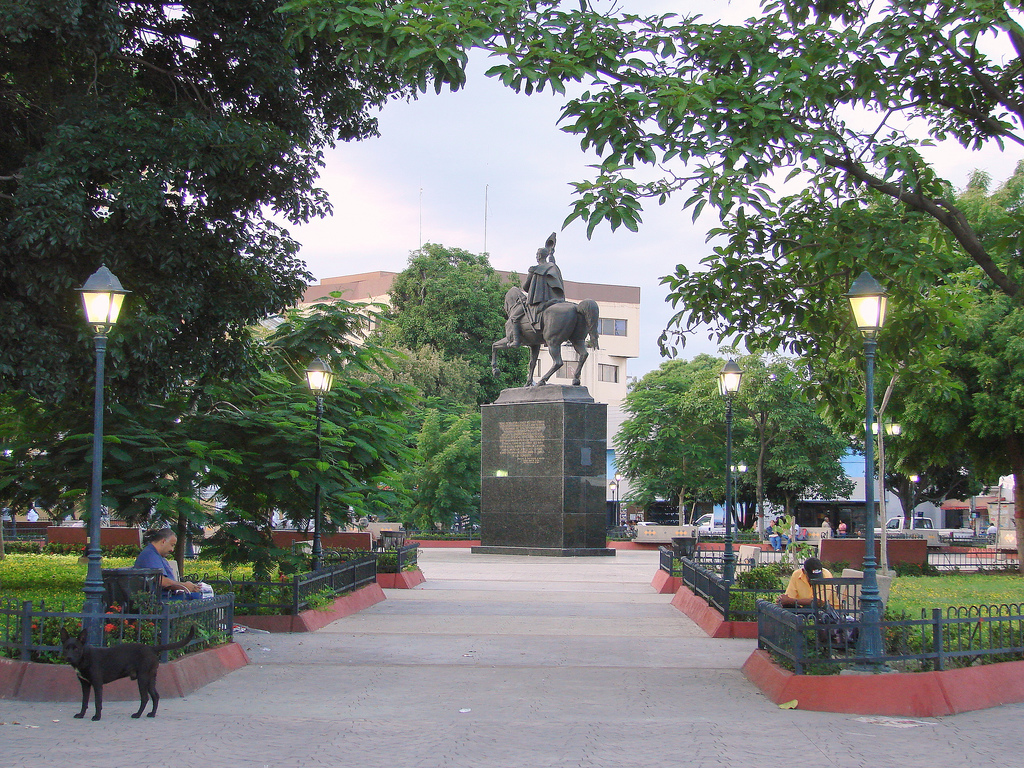
- A square in central Cagua

- Flag Coat of arms

- Location within Venezuela
- Coordinates: 10°11′15″N 67°27′40″W
- Country: Venezuela
- State: Aragua
- Municipality: Sucre Municipality
- Founded: 1620

Area
  - Total: 40 km^{2} (15 sq mi)
- Elevation: 458 m (1,503 ft)

Population (2001)
  - Total: 107,932
  - Demonym: cagüeño/a or cagüense
- Time zone: UTC−4 (VET)
- Postal code: 0122
- Area code: 0244
- Climate: Aw

Cagua (Spanish pronunciation: [ˈkaɣwa]) is a city of Venezuela, capital of the Sucre Municipality of Aragua State. Cagua is part of the metropolitan area of Maracay.

== History ==
Cagua was established in 1620 as "Cagua La Vieja", a town of original Spaniards. Cagua was rebuilt in its current location in 1622 with the new name of "Nuestra Señora del Rosario de Cagua", which was changed to "San José de Cagua" during the 18th century. The city is now known simply as Cagua. The origin of the name comes from the indigenous Cumanagoto word "Cahigua", which means snail.

== Geography ==
Cagua is located at 458 meters above sea level in the valley of Aragua, in the northwestern part of the Aragua State. Its climate is Köppen's Tropical savannah.

Cagua is one of the most important cities of Aragua state because it is close to Maracay (about 14 km away), the capital city of Aragua, it is close to Valencia, Carabobo (about 65 km away) and it is also nearby Caracas (at 97 km away), Venezuela's capital city. Cagua has been, for a long time, an important industrial zone.

== See also ==
- List of cities and towns in Venezuela
