= Juan Manuel Sucre Figarella =

Venezuelan military officer (1925–1996)

Juan Manuel Sucre Figarella (1925-1996), was a Venezuelan army Brigadier General who served as Chief of Staff of the Venezuelan Army in the 1970s during the administration of President Rafael Caldera. He was a member of the Sucre family and a direct descendant of Vicente Vitto Luis Ramón de Sucre Pardo y García de Urbaneja, the father of the War of Independence hero Antonio José de Sucre.

== Family and early life ==
Born in Tumeremo, Bolívar state in Venezuela in 1925 he was orphaned at a young age and left to do a lot of the upbringing of his younger siblings Leopoldo, Ines Matilde, Antonio, Jose Francisco and Guillermo. All the siblings would go on to achieve great things in their lifetimes, in the field of politics, arts and medicine.

== Military career ==
General Sucre graduated from the Academia Militar de Venezuela and went on to complete high military degrees in different areas in Brazil's Escola Superior de Guerra and in the United States. General Sucre went on to serve as a part of the United Nations's peacemaking forces (the famous Blue Helmets) in India in the 1960s during conflicts with Pakistan.

General Sucre's military career reached a high point when President Caldera named him Jefe de la Casa Militar (Chief of the Military House) which placed General Sucre at the head of all presidential security needs and procedures. Their relationship was a very close one and they remained very close friends for the rest of their lives, bringing together both families as their wives, Alicia Pietri de Caldera and Gisela Garcia de Sucre, also became great friends. During his time as Chief, Sucre had to deal with sporadic but important guerilla movements all over the nation that threatened the stability of the emerging democratic movement.

In February 1974, the last year of Caldera's presidency, Sucre was named Chief of Staff of the Army, the highest office in the Venezuelan Army. He remained in the post till April 1975. As Carlos Andrés Pérez, a member of Caldera's COPEI's main rival, Accion Democratica, took the office of President, he replaced Sucre Figarella with Manuel Bereciartu.

== Post-Military Life ==
After achieving the highest office in his career, General Sucre decided to retire soon after his replacement was put in place. He served as President of Seguros Horizontes, a branch of the Army in charge of providing insurance to officers and others. Later he would serve as President of the supermarket chain Cada and as Vice President of Operations and Security for Banco del Orinoco until the time of his death in 1996.

== Personal life ==
Sucre married Gisela García Gruber, a first cousin of diplomat Juan Garcia Gruber, in the 1940s, and fathered eight children. He was a devout Catholic and a member of the Salesian Order of the Roman Catholic Church. He died due to pancreas cancer on August 26, 1996.

President Caldera would perhaps best sum up his life with his phrase uttered to Sucre Figarella in the 1970s when he said, "General Sucre, you are the General Sucre of the 20th Century", meaning that he was the natural heir to the great Venezuelan hero - and his relative - General Antonio José de Sucre.

== See also ==
- List of Venezuelans
