= Sucre Municipality, Mérida =

Sucre Municipality Municipio Sucre
- Municipality
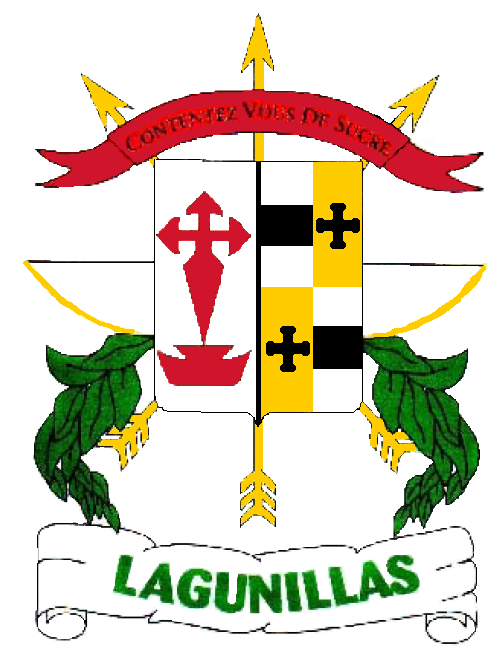
- Flag Coat of arms

- Location in Mérida

- Location in Venezuela
- Coordinates: 8°35′00″N 71°30′00″W
- Country: Venezuela
- State: Mérida
- Municipal seat: Lagunillas

Government
  - Mayor: Ángel Sánchez (PSUV) (PSUV)

Area
  - Total: 980 km^{2} (380 sq mi)

Population (2011)
  - Total: 114,509
  - Density: 120/km^{2} (300/sq mi)
- Time zone: UTC−4 (VET)
- Area code(s): 0274
- Website: Official website

Sucre Municipality is one of the 23 municipalities (municipios) that make up the Venezuelan state of Mérida and the municipality has a population of 24,509 according to the 2011 census conducted by the National Institute of Statistics. The municipal seat of the Sucre Municipality is Lagunillas.

== Name ==
The municipality is one of several in Venezuela named "Sucre Municipality" in honour of Venezuelan independence hero Antonio José de Sucre.
