= Sucre Municipality, Táchira =

Sucre Municipality Municipio Sucre
- Municipality
- Flag Coat of arms

- Location in Táchira

- Location in Venezuela
- Coordinates: 7°51′14″N 72°00′11″W
- Country: Venezuela
- State: Táchira
- Municipal seat: Queniquea

Government
  - Mayor: Carlos Rodríguez Vera (PSUV)

Area
  - Total: 376.3 km^{2} (145.3 sq mi)

Population (2011 -> 2019 projection)
  - Total: 8,189
  - Density: 21.76/km^{2} (56.36/sq mi)
- 7,494 -> 7,912
- Time zone: UTC−4 (VET)

Sucre Municipality is one of the 29 municipalities in Táchira, Venezuela. Its capital is Queniquea. Based on the 2011 Venezuelan census, the population was 7,494. The mayor is Carlos Rodríguez Vera of the PSUV party since July 2025.

== Name ==
The municipality is one of several in Venezuela named "Sucre Municipality" in honour of Venezuelan independence hero Antonio José de Sucre.

== Demographics ==
Based on the 2011 Venezuelan census, The population of the Sucre Municipality was 7,494 people, accounting for 0.6% of the total population of the state of Táchira. Less than half (40.7%) of the municipality's population is in the town of Queniquea, the municipal seat.

By June 2019, official projections from the Venezuelan Statistics National Institute estimated the population of Sucre as 7,912 people, representing an annual growth rate of 0.68% since 2011 and showing a population density of 19.44 inhabitants/km². However, these projections do not account for the impact of emigration linked to the country's recent economic and political circumstances.

The gender distribution of the population was 53.4% men (3,907) and 46.6% women (3,413). The age distribution showed that the largest segment of the population was aged 15 to 64, comprising 64.3% of the people. Younger people aged 0 to 14 made up 28% of the population, while those aged 65 and older accounted for 7.7%. The municipality is more rural than urbanized, with 59.3% of inhabitants (4,341) living in rural areas compared to 40.7% (2,979) in urban centers.

Ethnically, the municipality identified as predominantly White people (56.3%) and Mestizo (42%). Minority groups included 0.5% Afro-Venezuelans and 1.2% belonging to other ethnic groups. The literacy rate was 86.7%, with 809 inhabitants of Sucre not able to read or write.

== Government ==
The mayor of the Sucre Municipality is Carlos Rodríguez Vera of the United Socialist Party of Venezuela. He won the election in July 2025. The municipality is divided into three parishes; Eleazar López Contreras, San Pablo, and Sucre.
