= Antonio José de Sucre Municipality =

Antonio José de Sucre Municipality Municipio Antonio José de Sucre
- Municipality
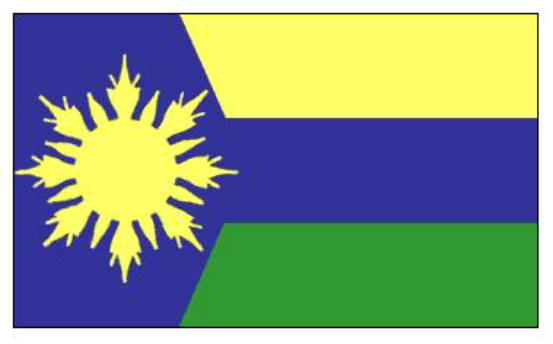
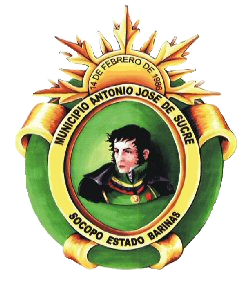
- Flag Coat of arms

- Location in Barinas

- Location in Venezuela
- Coordinates: 8°06′05″N 70°41′59″W
- Country: Venezuela
- State: Barinas
- Municipal seat: Socopó

Government
  - Mayor: Salvador Guerrero Márquez (PSUV)

Area
  - Total: 3,133.4 km^{2} (1,209.8 sq mi)

Population (2011)
  - Total: 81,665
  - Density: 26.063/km^{2} (67.502/sq mi)
- Time zone: UTC−4 (VET)
- Area code(s): 0273
- Website: Official website

Antonio José de Sucre is one of the 12 municipalities (municipios) that makes up the Venezuelan state of Barinas and, according to the 2011 census by the National Institute of Statistics of Venezuela, the municipality has a population of 81,665. The town of Socopó is the shire town of the Antonio José de Sucre Municipality. The municipality is one of several in Venezuela named in honour of Venezuelan independence hero Antonio José de Sucre (the others include only his surname, as "Sucre Municipality").

== Demographics ==
The Antonio José de Sucre Municipality, according to a 2007 population estimate by the National Institute of Statistics of Venezuela, has a population of 74,968 (up from 63,947 in 2000). This amounts to 9.9% of the state's population. The municipality's population density is 25.2 inhabitants per square kilometre (65/sq mi).

== Government ==
The mayor of the Antonio José de Sucre Municipality is Salvador Guerrero, elected on October 31, 2004, with 46% of the vote. He replaced Trino Hurtado shortly after the elections. The municipality is divided into three parishes; Ticoporo, Andrés Bello, and Nicolás Pulido.
