= Sucre family =

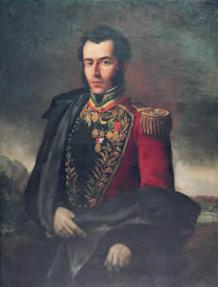
Antonio José de Sucre (1795–1830), by Martín Tovar y Tovar

The Sucre family is a prominent political family of Venezuela.

== Origin ==
The family was founded in Venezuela, by Carlos Francisco de Sucre Garrido y Pardo, a Flanders-born noble, son of Charles Adrien de Sucre y d'Yves, Marquess of Preux, of Flemish origin, and of María Buenaventura Carolina Isabel Garrido de Sánchez y Pardo de Figueroa, Lady of Syssele, of Spanish origin. Carlos Francisco de Sucre Garrido y Pardo, served as a soldier of Catalunya to the Spanish Crown in 1689, and was later named Governor of Cartagena de Indias and Governor and Captain General of Cuba. On 22 December 1779, the family arrived in Venezuela as Sucre Garrido y Pardo was appointed Governor of New Andalucia, the easternmost province of the then Captaincy General of Venezuela and where the family would remain for almost all its history. He married Margarita de Flores y Trelles and had a son Antonio Mauricio de Sucre Pardo y Trelles, married to Josefa Margarita Francisca García de Urbaneja y Sánchez de Torres, daughter of Francisco Manuel García de Urbaneja y Andrade and wife Teresa Sánchez de Torres y Gobea. Their son Vicente de Sucre y García de Urbaneja married María Manuela de Alcalá y Sánchez Ramírez de Arellano, daughter of Pedro de Alcalá y Rendón and wife Juana Jerónima Sánchez Ramírez de Arellano y Vallenilla, and their son was António José de Sucre y Alcalá.

== Antonio José de Sucre ==
Members of this family have excelled in modern Venezuelan history and have had a deep impact in that country's events. The most well-known member is General Antonio José de Sucre. He was a prominent figure in the Spanish American independence movement against Spain and is considered a founder of Bolivia, the liberator of Ecuador, and the Grand Marshal of Ayacucho. During the Spanish regime, he was originally appointed as a lieutenant in the provincial armed forces of the Venezuelan republics, serving under General Santiago Marino. Sucre later became the first lieutenant to the liberator Simon Bolivar and was widely touted to replace Bolivar as the leader of the newly independent Latin American nations before his untimely death in the hands of royalist rebels in 1830. While Bolivar is described as the charismatic leader who rallied the independence forces to fight, historians recognize Sucre as the military genius behind him.

Under Bolivar, he was involved in the purchase of armaments, issuing military orders, recruitment, and personnel assignments. Sucre also run a spy network against the royalists until they retreated into the highlands southwest of Lima. Sucre is particularly famous for the Battle of Pichincha in 1822, where he quashed the Spaniards and liberated Ecuador. There is also the case of the Battle of Ayacucho, where he triumphed over Royalist army despite being vastly outnumbered. His forces sustained 309 dead and 607 wounded to the Royalists' 1,400 dead and 700 wounded. His ability as a statesman was tested when he engaged in diplomatic missions, negotiating the armistice with Spain particularly in 1820.

== Recent history ==
In the 20th century the family has once again become prominent in Venezuelan life as its members have taken roles in literature, politics, military and business. During the 1960s and 1970s the Sucre Figarella brothers were almost all involved in Venezuelan life serving in areas such as the military, public infrastructure, legislature, foreign service and literature. The oldest brother Juan Manuel Sucre was a general and served as Commander in Chief of the Army; his younger brother Leopoldo had the most active participation in politics as he was Governor and Senator of the state of Bolivar, Minister of Public Works, and as President of the state-owned Corporación Venezolana de Guayana; the third brother Jose Francisco was a key member of the foreign policy community serving as Ambassador to the United Nations and a number of European countries such as Russia and Austria. During the early half of the 20th century, another member of the family, José Antonio Ramos Sucre, had achieved fame as a great poet.

Nowadays, members of the family are mostly involved in private businesses.

== Motto and Coat of Arms ==
The family coat of arms and its motto, in French, Contentez Vous de Sucre, is included in the 2,000 Venezuelan bolívar bill between 1994 and 1998.

== Named in Honor of Antonio José de Sucre ==
Different places (and a former currency) across Latin America are named after Antonio José de Sucre, among them:

- Sucre, Bolivia, the judicial capital of Bolivia.
- Sucre, Venezuela, one of the States in Venezuela.
- Sucre, Colombia, one of the Departments of Colombia.
- Sucre, the currency of Ecuador until the year 2000.

== Notable members ==
Some notable members of the Sucre family are:

- Carlos de Sucre Garrido y Pardo, (b. 1680), Marquess of Preux, Governor of the Province of Cartagena de Indias
- Antonio José de Sucre, (1795–1830), General, Grand Marshal of Ayacucho, President of Bolivia
  - Andres Sucre, former Minister of Public Works;
  - Juan Manuel Sucre Figarella, (1925–1996), General, former Commander in Chief of the Army
  - Leopoldo Sucre Figarella, (1926–1996) former Minister of Public Works; Senator; President of CVG; former Governor of Bolivar
  - Guillermo Sucre Figarella, poet and literary critic
- José Antonio Ramos Sucre,(1890-1930) notable poet and writer
- Luis Alberto Sucre, well-known Venezuelan historian
- Jesús Sucre, (1988-), catcher Seattle Mariners
- Jorge Sucre, President of opposition party Proyecto Venezuela
  - Antonio Jose Sucre, General Surgeon, La Floresta Hospital in Caracas
- Juan Manuel Sucre Trias (1940–1983), economist, Accion Democratica leader, parliamentarian and diplomat.
  - Jose Manuel Sucre Ciffoni, (born 1963), attorney, parliamentarian, former Secretary of the Presidency of Venezuela and United Nations official.
