= Sucre Municipality, Falcón =

Sucre Municipality Municipio Sucre
- Municipality
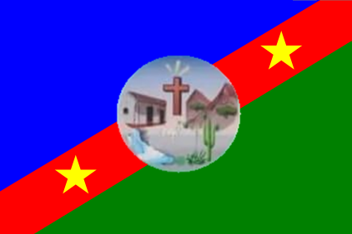
- Flag

- Location in Falcón

- Location in Venezuela
- Coordinates: 11°00′43″N 69°51′24″W
- Country: Venezuela
- State: Falcón
- Municipal seat: La Cruz de Taratara[*]

Government
  - Mayor: Carlos Torrealba Romero (PSUV)

Area
  - Total: 777.8 km^{2} (300.3 sq mi)

Population (2001)
  - Total: 5,155
  - Density: 6.628/km^{2} (17.17/sq mi)
- Time zone: UTC−4 (VET)

Sucre Municipality is a municipality in Falcón State, Venezuela.

== Name ==
The municipality is one of several in Venezuela named "Sucre Municipality" in honour of Venezuelan independence hero Antonio José de Sucre.
