= Leopoldo Sucre Figarella =

Venezuelan politician (1925–1996)

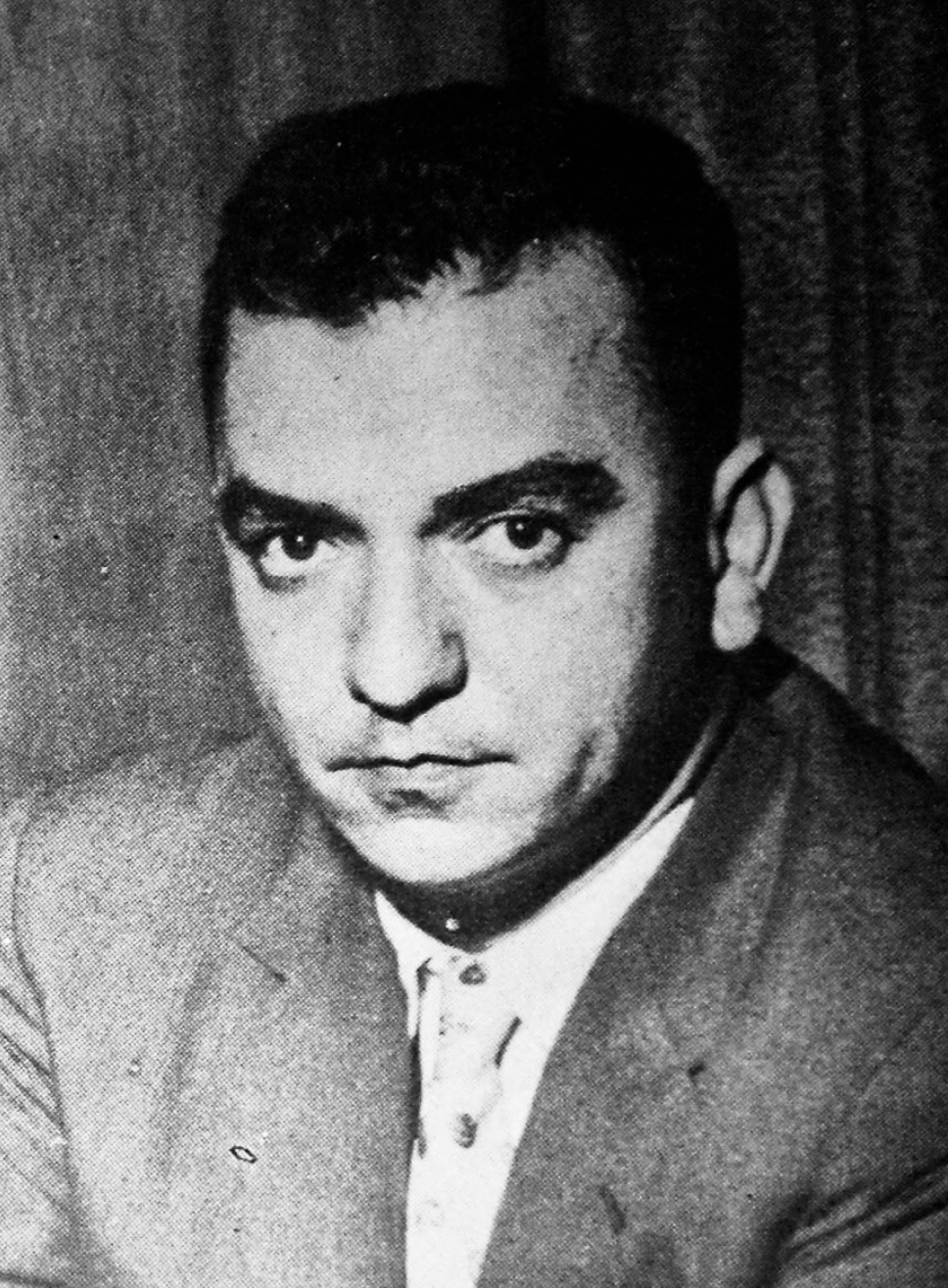
Leopoldo Sucre Figarella

Leopoldo Sucre Figarella was a Venezuelan politician and engineer of Corsican ancestors. A member of the Sucre family Sucre Figarella served as governor, minister and senator during his long and eventful political career. He was nicknamed "The Builder" and "The Czar of Guayana".

== Biography ==
=== Early career ===
He was born in Tumeremo in the state of Bolivar on August 1, 1925. He received his education as a civil engineer at the Universidad Central de Venezuela and soon entered public service as an engineer at the Ministry of Public Works in Miranda. During the 1950s, he actively opposed the dictatorship of Marcos Pérez Jiménez and had to go into hiding several times due to security concerns.

In 1958 and with the fall of Pérez Jiménez, Sucre Figarella was named Governor of Bolivar by new president Romulo Betancourt. There he pushed for the creation of Santo Tomé de Guayana, today known as Ciudad Guayana, one of the most important and largest cities in the state. From 1960 to 1969 he served as minister of public works during the governments of Betancourt and Raul Leoni. From this position, Sucre pushed forward many important works such as the Angostura Bridge in Ciudad Bolívar, the General Rafael Urdaneta Bridge in Maracaibo, the Araña highway distributor, the Tejerías-Caracas highway, the Guri Dam in Bolivar, the famous Cota Mil in Caracas as well as pushing forth works on the Caracas Metro and the expansion of the Simón Bolívar International Airport among others.

=== President of the CVG ===
In 1984, President Jaime Lusinchi named him president of the Corporacion Venezolana de Guayana with the rank of cabinet member. From there Sucre Figarella gave an important push to the region's development, the likes of which had not been seen previously. During this time the Guri Dam project is finally completed, the Ciudad Bolívar–Ciudad Guayana and Ciudad Guayana–Upata highways are built along with other important roadworks including the completion of several bridges. He also expanded the production capacity of SIDOR, Ferrominera, Venalum, Alcasa and Interalumina and created Bauxiven, Carbonorca, Proforca, Remorca and other important companies. The entire waterworks of the Guayana region was improved upon along with the health, justice, sports and agriculture infrastructure.

Some, such as newspaper columnist José Ignacio Acevedo, consider Sucre Figarella's infrastructure construction to be the most useful and expansive during the whole of the democratic period in Venezuela. He would remain at the helm of the CVG during the presidencies of Jaime Lusinchi and Carlos Andrés Pérez, finally stepping down in 1993. During his time with the CVG, he had also been elected Senator for the state of Bolivar for the period between 1984 and 1989.

After his resignation from the state-owned company, he was elected for another period lasting between 1994 and 1999. He was unable to complete this second appointment due to his sudden death on October 17, 1996 only a few months after the death of his brother Juan Manuel Sucre Figarella.

== See also ==
- List of Venezuelans
