= Sucre Municipality, Sucre =

- Coat of arms

- Coordinates: 10.4167°N 64.0833°W

Sucre Municipality

Sucre is a municipality of Sucre, Venezuela. It has seven parishes and the capital is Cumaná, which is also the capital of the state. As of 2021, it has a population of 451,794.

== Name ==
The municipality is one of several in Venezuela named "Sucre Municipality" in honour of Venezuelan independence hero Antonio José de Sucre.
