= Sucre, Sucre Department =

Coordinates: 8.81389°N 74.7253°W

Sucre, Sucre
- Municipality and town
- Flag Coat of arms

- Location of the municipality and town of Sucre, Sucre in the Sucre Department of Colombia.
- Country: Colombia
- Department: Sucre Department

Government
  - Mayor: Assad Elías Cure Hernández,(2024-2027)

Area
  - Total: 1,110.54 km^{2} (428.78 sq mi)
- Elevation: 20 m (66 ft)

Population (Census 2018)
  - Total: 23,971
  - Density: 21.585/km^{2} (55.905/sq mi)
- Time zone: UTC-5 (Colombia Standard Time)

Sucre is a town and municipality located in the Sucre Department, northern Colombia. It is located with the municipalities of Majagual and Guaranda in the subregion of the Mojana, which conforms part of the so-called Moposine depression, a geographical area characterized by being under sea-level and therefore prone to flooding.

Sucre used to be the home of famous writer Gabriel García Márquez, and one of his best-known novels, Chronicle of a Death Foretold, is based on real life events which occurred in the town.
