= List of cities and towns in Venezuela =

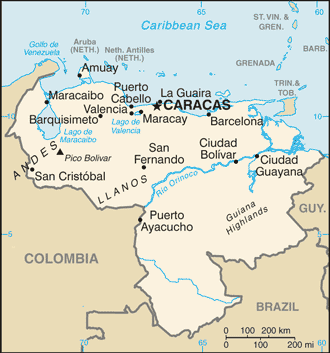
Map of Venezuela

This is a list of cities, towns and communities in Venezuela. The state capitals are marked with a *.

== List ==
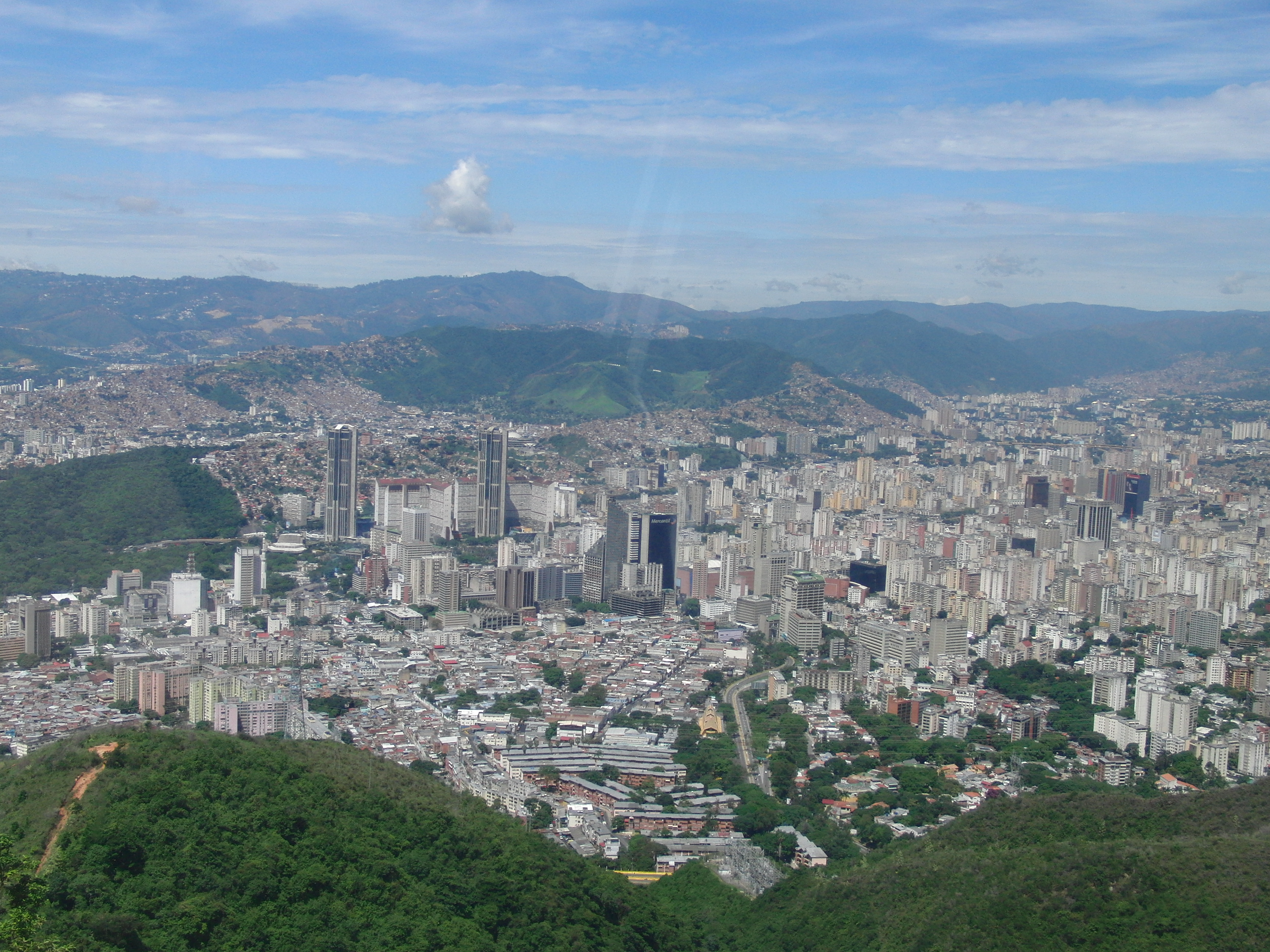
Caracas, the capital of Venezuela

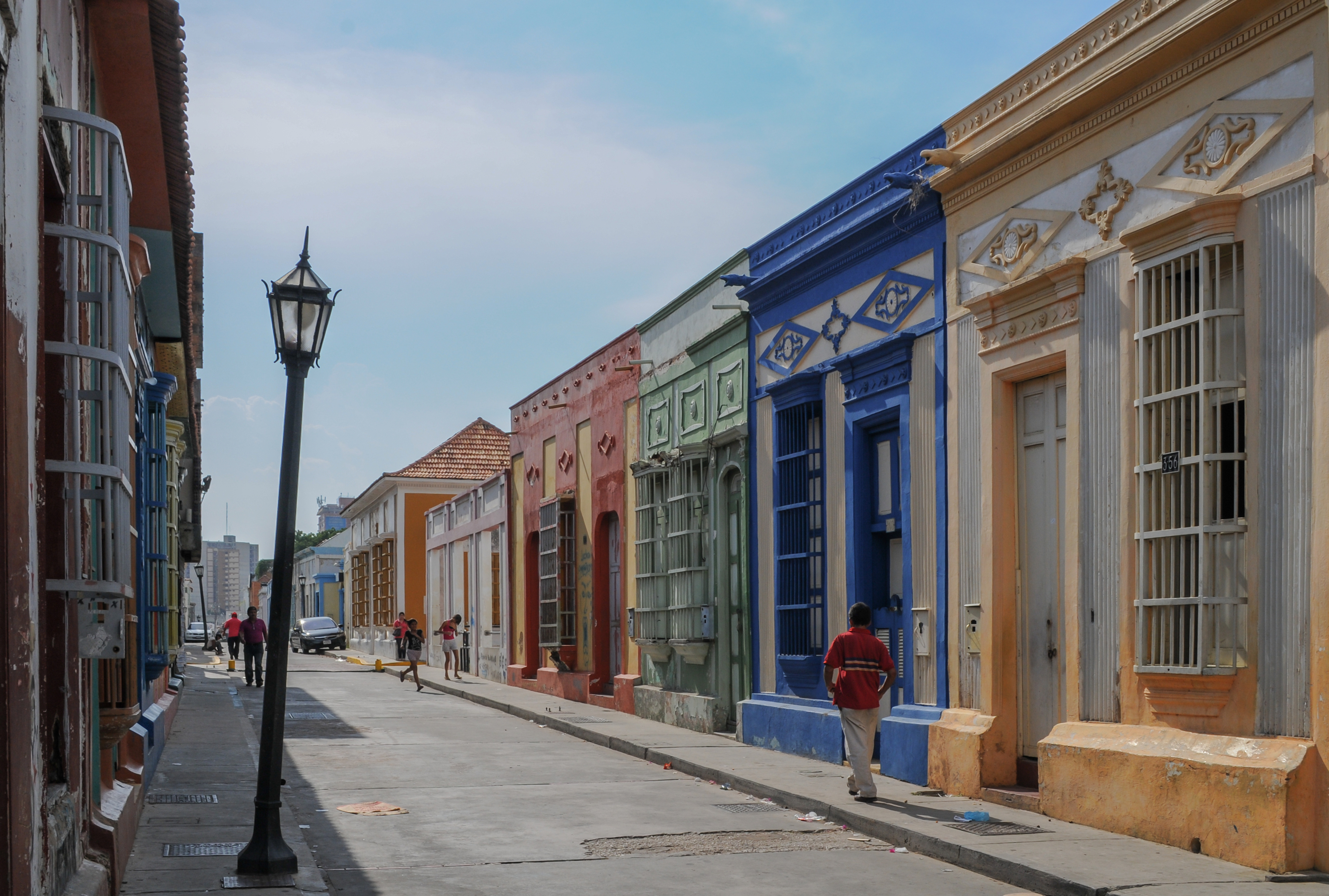
Maracaibo

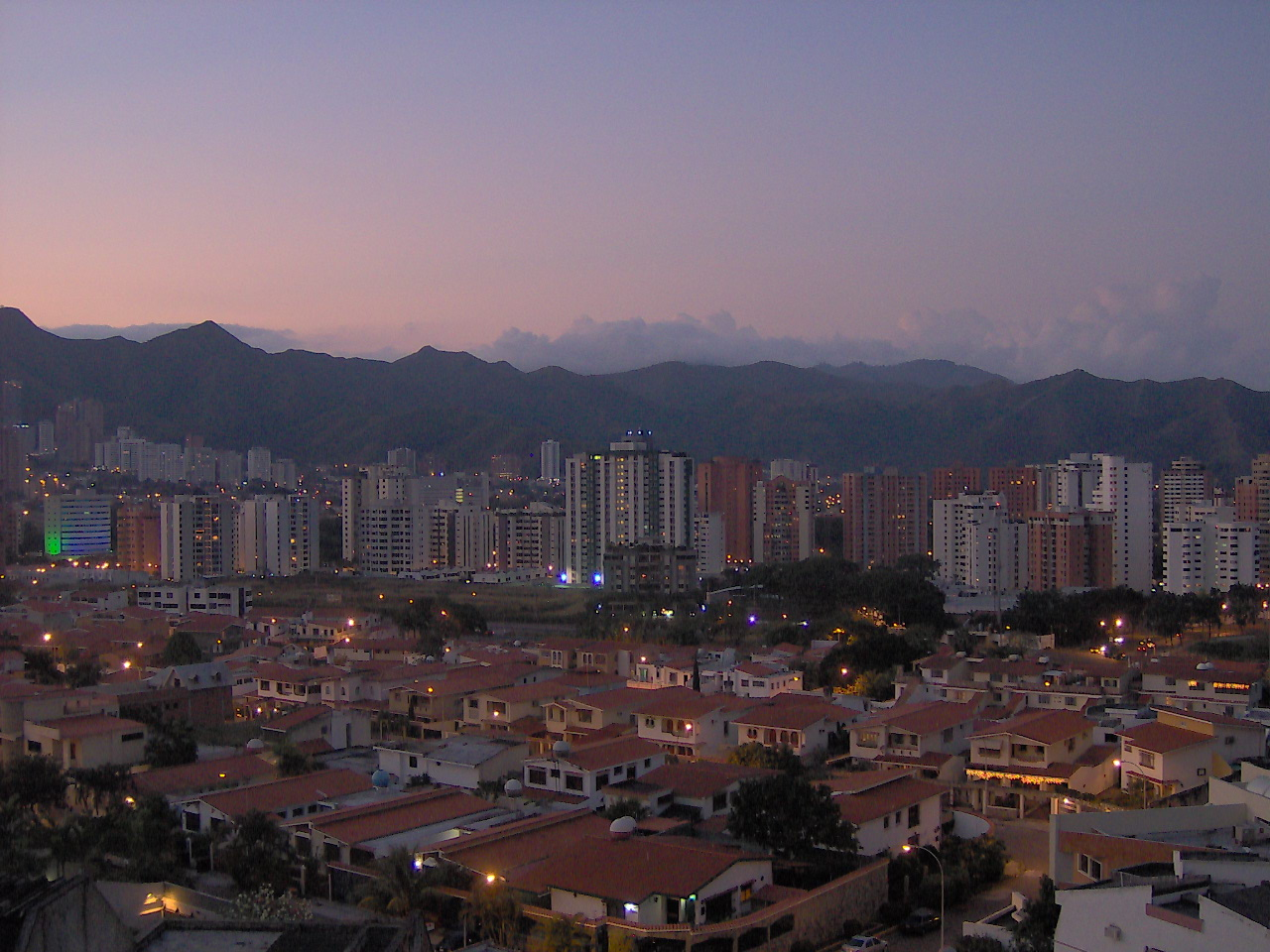
Valencia

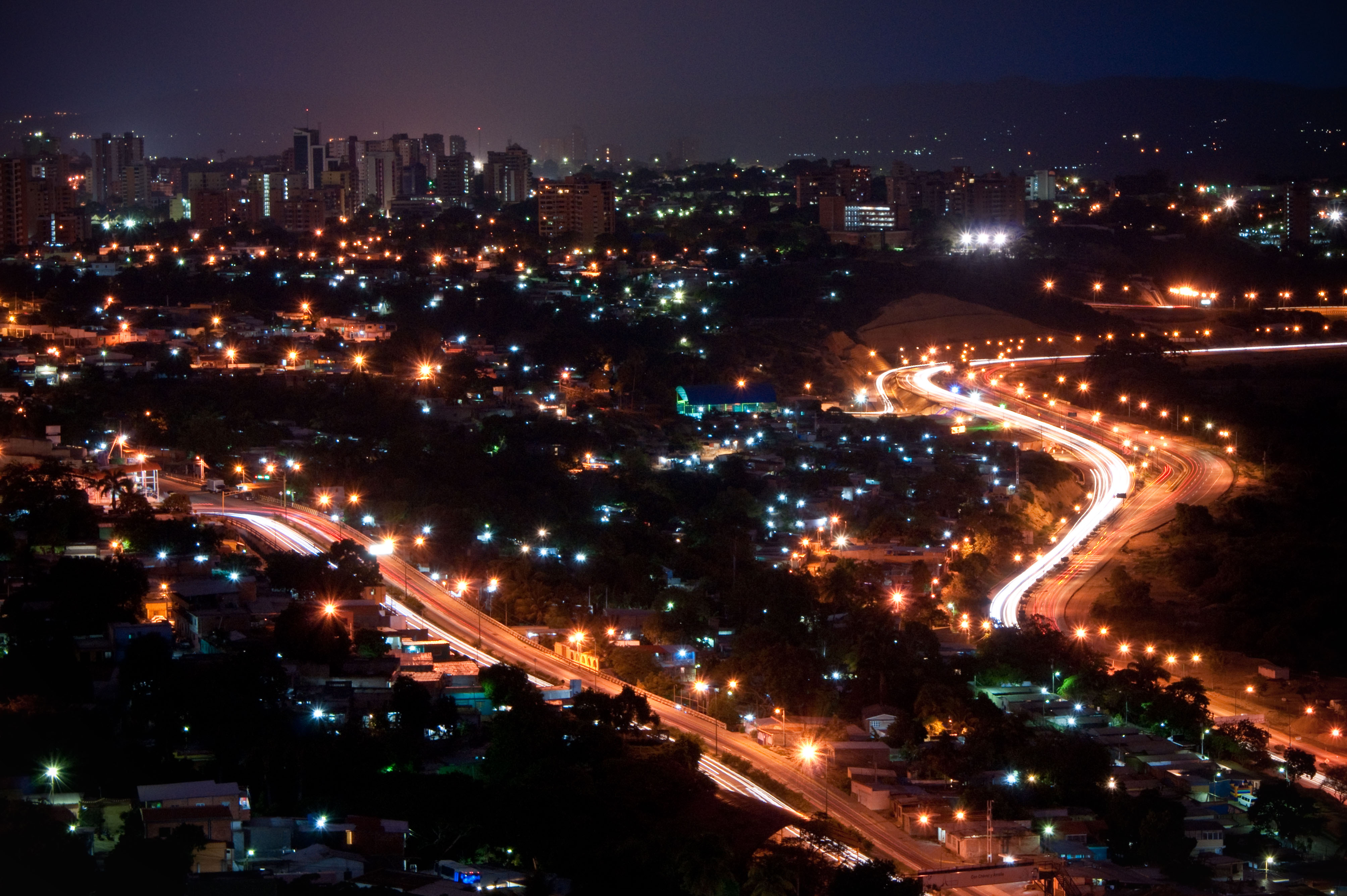
Barquisimeto

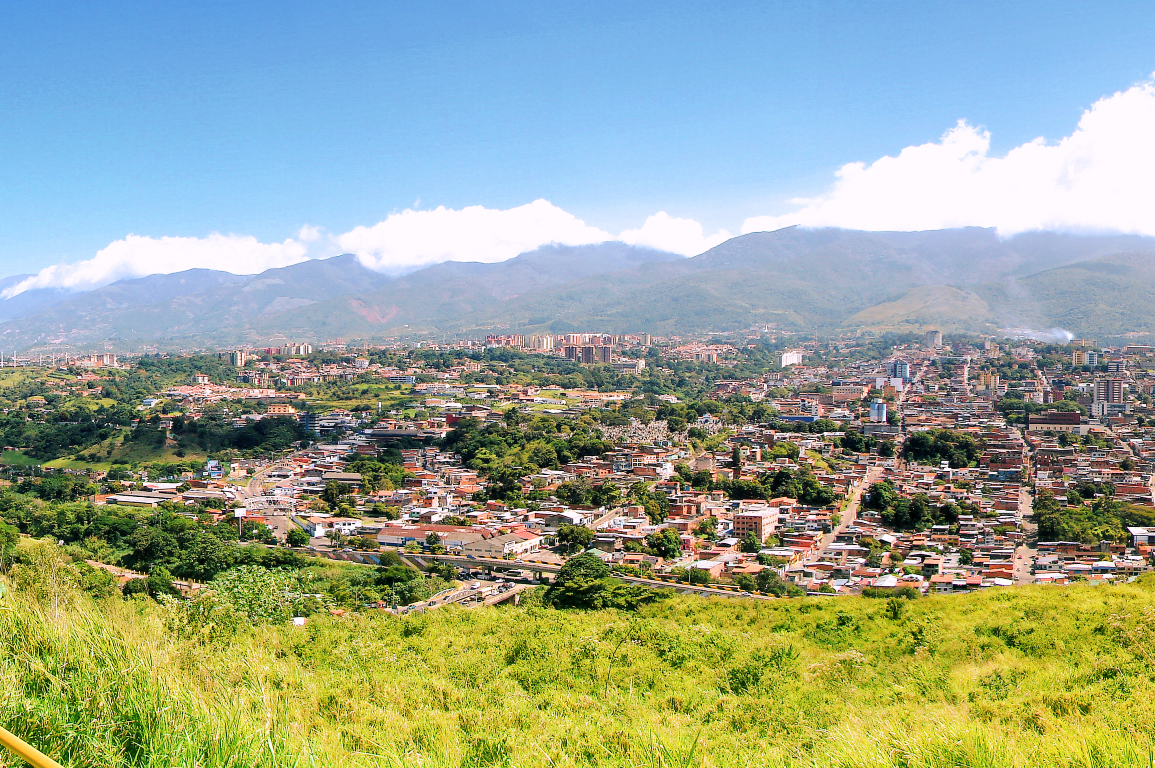
San Cristóbal

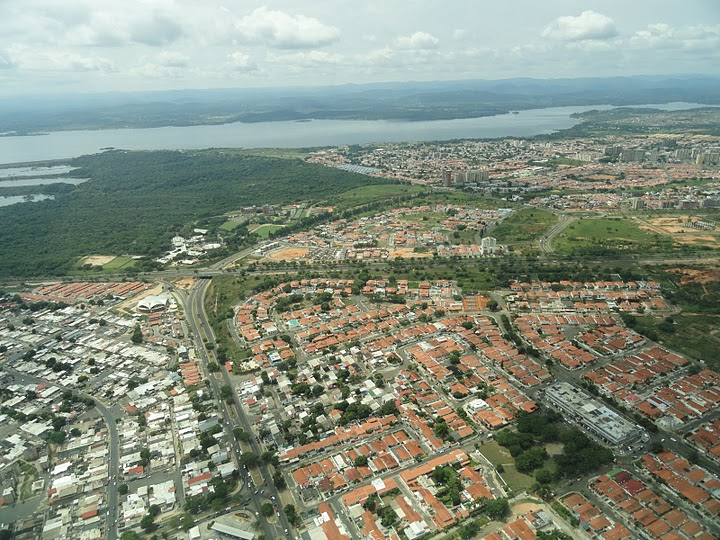
Ciudad Guayana

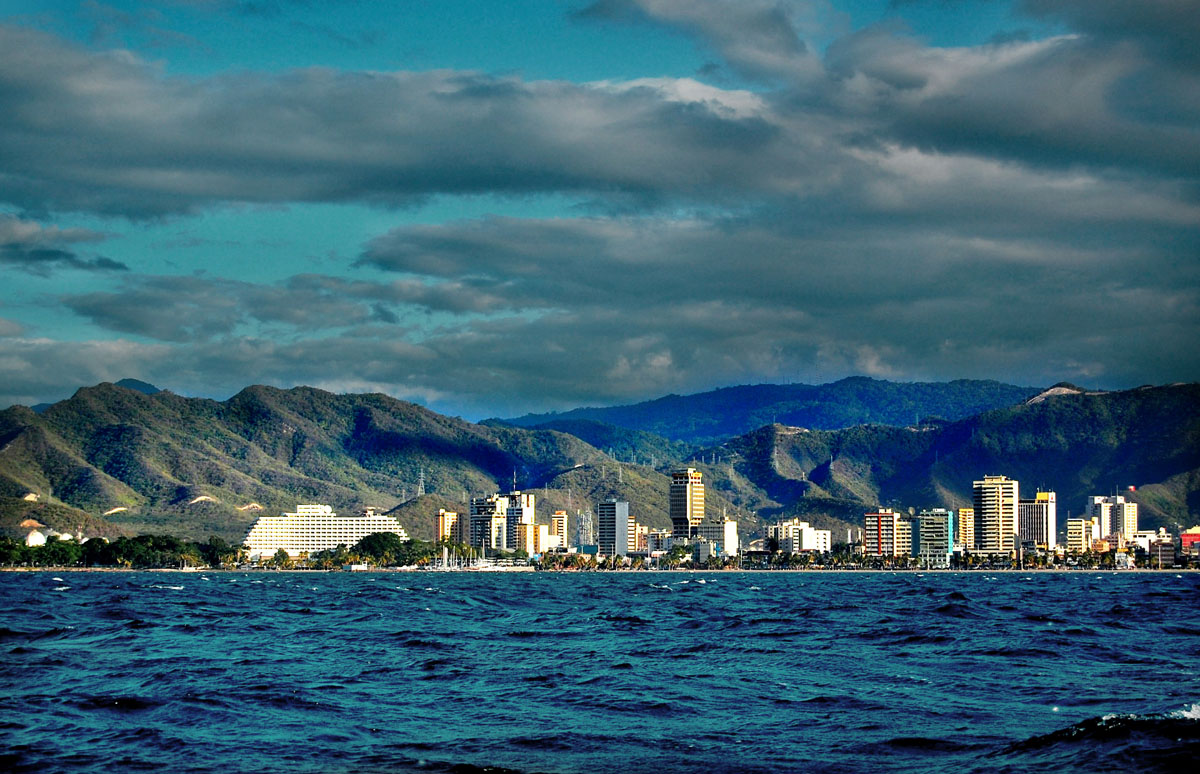
Puerto la Cruz

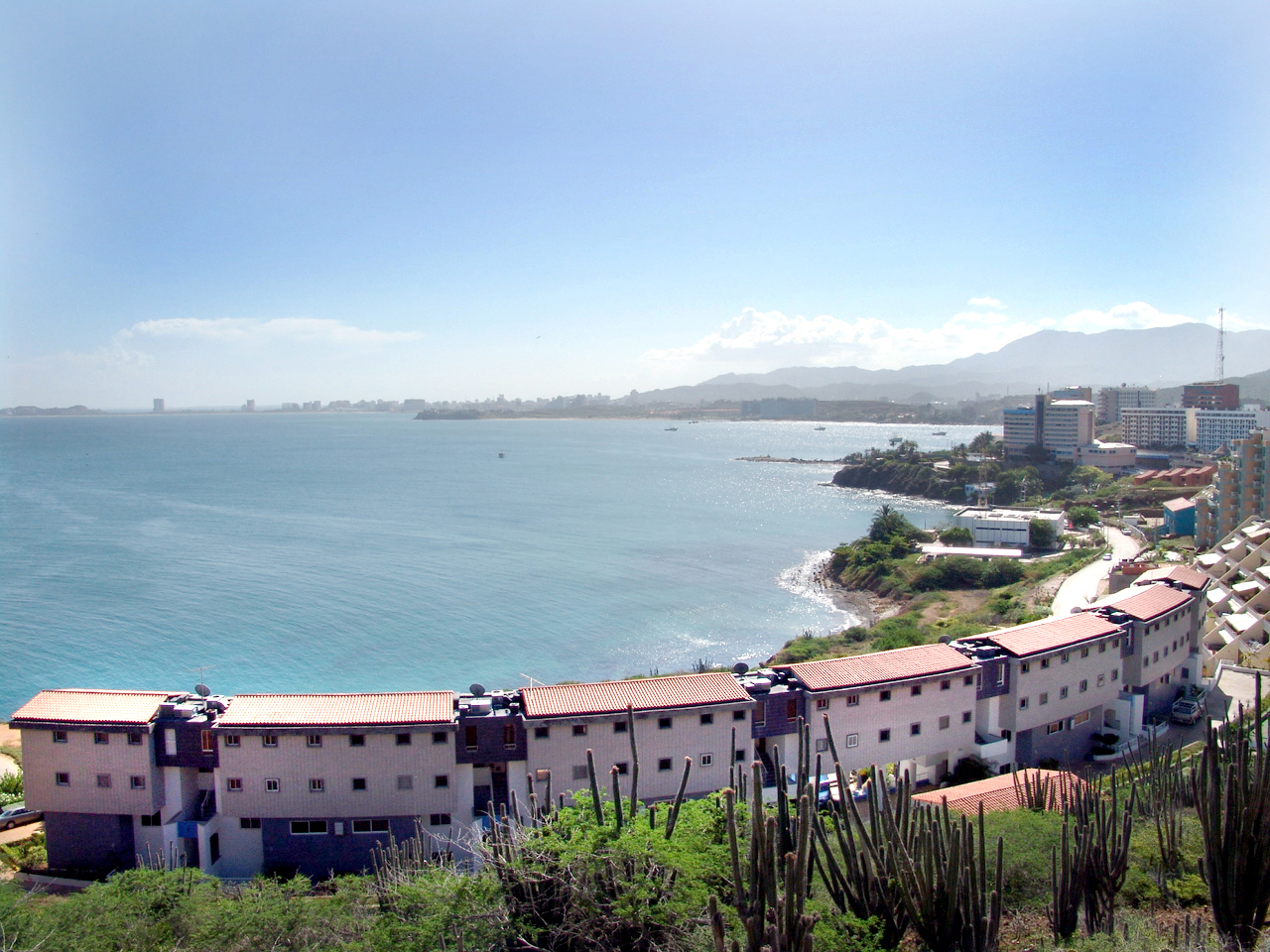
Pampatar

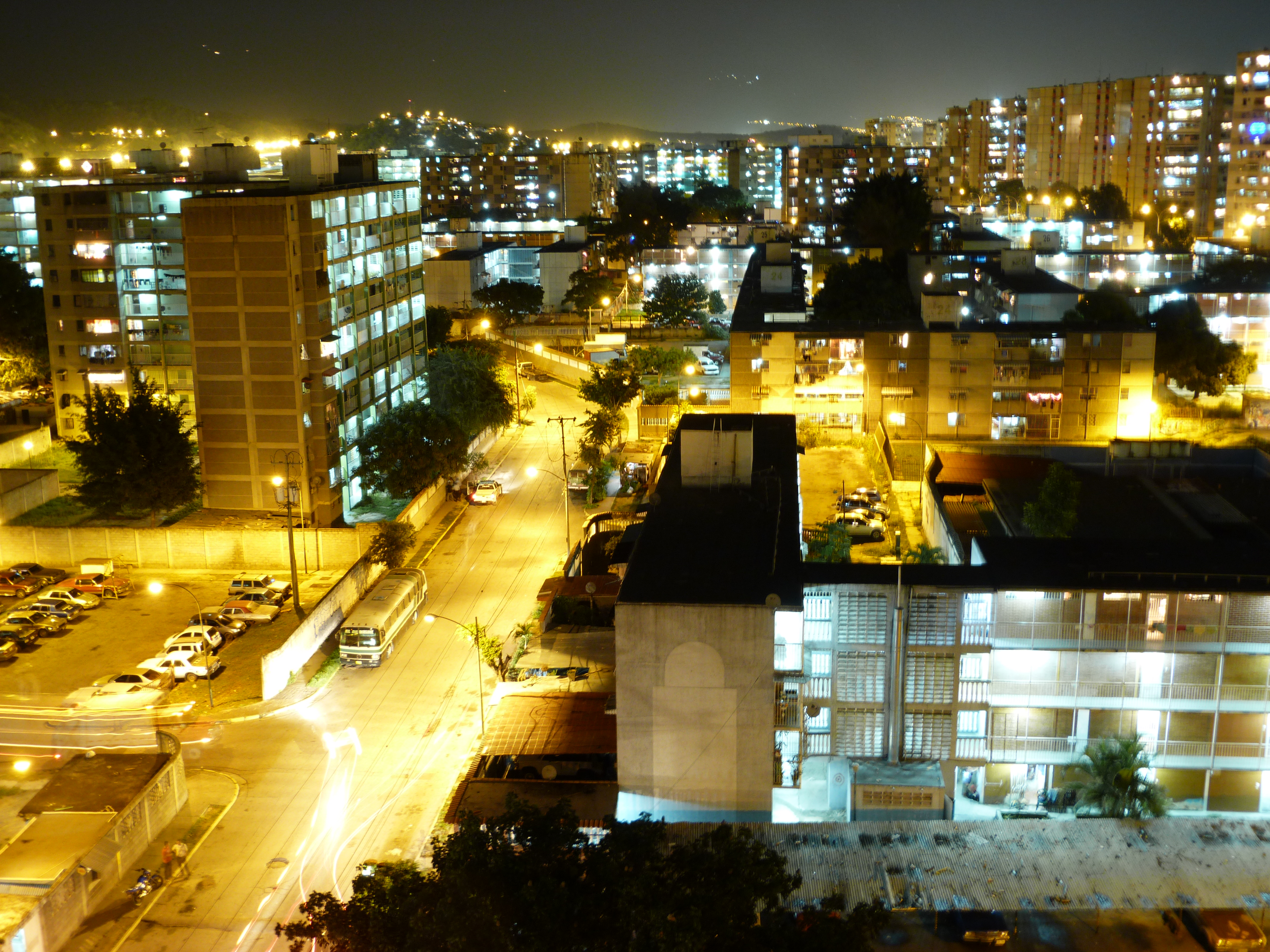
Guarenas

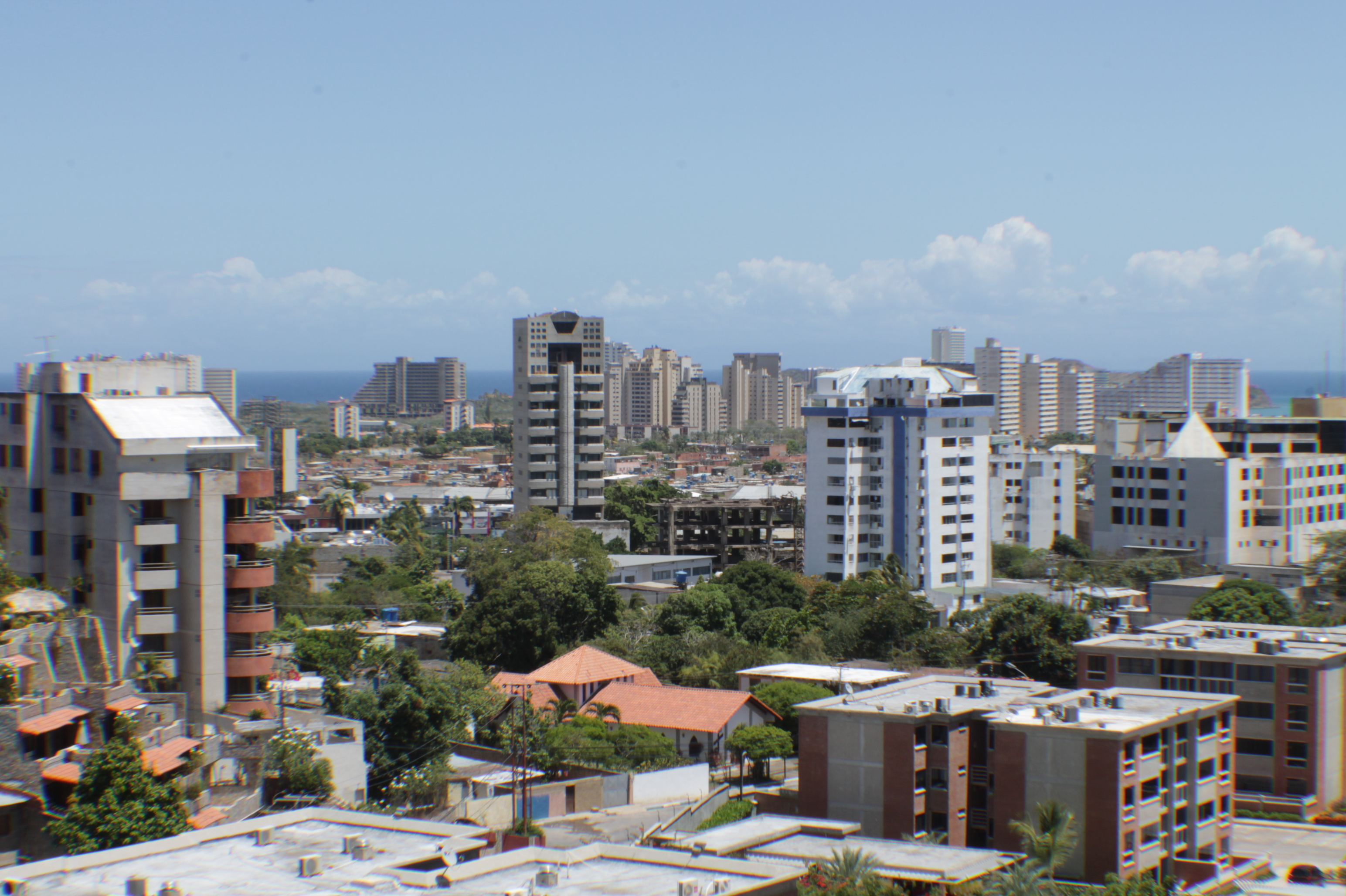
Porlamar

No.	City	Founded as	Pop.	State	Year	Flag
1	Isla Ratón		3,000	Amazonas	1943	
2	La Esmeralda		20,030	Amazonas	1758	
3	Maroa		890	Amazonas	1760	
4	Puerto Ayacucho*		41,000	Amazonas	1924	
5	San Carlos de Río Negro		1,200	Amazonas	1759	
6	San Fernando de Atabapo		5,000	Amazonas	1758	
7	San Juan de Manapiare		991	Amazonas	1940	
8	Anaco		117,605	Anzoátegui	1944	
9	Aragua de Barcelona	Aragua de Barcelona	27,025	Anzoátegui	1735	
10	Barcelona*		454,200	Anzoátegui	1671	
11	Caigua		8,000	Anzoátegui	1667	
12	Cantaura		42,000	Anzoátegui	1740	
13	Clarines		15,000	Anzoátegui	1594	
14	El Chaparro		8,934	Anzoátegui		
15	El Tigre		151,011	Anzoátegui	1933	
16	Guanta		35,000	Anzoátegui	1594	
17	Lechería		37,829	Anzoátegui		
18	Mapire			Anzoátegui		
19	Onoto		12,358	Anzoátegui		
20	Pariguán		34,769	Anzoátegui	1744	
21	Puerto La Cruz		299,500	Anzoátegui	1934	
22	Puerto Píritu		11,000	Anzoátegui	1513	
23	San José de Guanipa		64,016	Anzoátegui	1910	
24	San Mateo		12,905	Anzoátegui		
25	San Miguel		4,000	Anzoátegui	1661	
26	San Tomé			Anzoátegui		
27	Santa Ana		16,000	Anzoátegui	1735	
28	Soledad		15,000	Anzoátegui		
29	Urica			Anzoátegui		
30	Valle de Guanape		20,000	Anzoátegui	1960	
31	Vidoño		3,500	Anzoátegui		
32	Zuata			Anzoátegui	1750	
33	Achaguas			Apure	1774	
34	Arichuna			Apure		
35	Biruaca			Apure		
36	Bruzual			Apure		
37	Ciudad Sucre		1,000	Apure	1997	
38	El Amparo			Apure		
39	Elorza			Apure		
40	Guachara		6,080	Apure	1780	
41	Guasdualito		105,000	Apure	1771	
42	Mantecal			Apure		
43	Puerto Páez		5,321	Apure	1922	
44	San Fernando de Apure*		175,000	Apure	1788	
45	San Juan de Payara			Apure	1768	
46	Barbacoas		16,469	Aragua	1712	
47	Cagua		119,052	Aragua	1620	
48	Camatagua		5,444	Aragua	1693	
49	Colonia Tovar		14,309	Aragua	1843	
50	El Consejo		41,748	Aragua		
51	El Limón		148,270	Aragua		
52	La Victoria		143,468	Aragua	1620	
53	Maracay*		464,700	Aragua	1701	
54	Morocopo		2,500	Aragua		
55	Ocumare de la Costa		7,000	Aragua	1731	
56	Palo Negro		128,895	Aragua		
57	San Casimiro		25,540	Aragua		
58	San Mateo		38,062	Aragua	1620	
59	San Sebastián			Aragua	1585	
60	Santa Cruz		29,773	Aragua		
61	Turmero		344,746	Aragua	1620	
62	Santa Rita	Valle de Santa Rita de Cascia	134,233	Aragua	1997	
63	Arismendi			Barinas		
64	Barinas*		284,305	Barinas	1577	
65	Sabaneta		2,490	Barinas	1787	
66	Caicara del Orinoco			Bolívar		
67	Ciudad Bolívar*		425,000	Bolívar	1595	
68	Ciudad Guayana		893,400	Bolívar	1961	
69	El Callao			Bolívar		
70	El Dorado			Bolívar		
71	El Paují			Bolívar		
72	Guasipati			Bolívar	1757	
73	Iboriwo			Bolívar		
74	Kavanayén			Bolívar		
75	Maripa		5,000	Bolívar		
76	Paraitepuy de Roraima			Bolívar		
77	San Francisco de Yuruaní			Bolívar		
78	Santa Elena de Uairén		29,795	Bolívar	1923	
79	San Rafael de Kamoirán			Bolívar		
80	Tumeremo		35,700	Bolívar		
81	Upata		168,856	Bolívar	1762	
82	Wonken			Bolívar		
83	Bejuma			Carabobo	1843	
84	Guacara		151,788	Carabobo	1624	
85	Guigue		60,000	Carabobo	1781	
86	Los Guayos		169,541	Carabobo	1694	
87	Mariara		115,515	Carabobo	1781	
88	Morón			Carabobo		
89	Naguanagua		144,308	Carabobo	1782	
90	Puerto Cabello		163,886	Carabobo	1730	
91	San Diego		187,215	Carabobo	1781	
92	San Joaquín		47,920	Carabobo		
93	Tocuyito			Carabobo	1547	
94	Valencia*	Nuestra Señora de la Asunción de Nueva Valencia del Rey	1,585,500	Carabobo	1555	
95	Cojedes		14,044	Cojedes		
96	El Pao			Cojedes	1661	
97	San Carlos*	San Carlos de Austria	83,957	Cojedes	1678	
98	Tinaco		25,000	Cojedes		
99	Tinaquillo		63,000	Cojedes	1781	
100	Curiapo			Delta Amacuro		
101	Pedernales		172,892	Delta Amacuro	1858	
102	Tucupita*		72,856	Delta Amacuro	1848	
103	Dabajuro		25,469	Falcón	1914	
104	Coro*		135,246	Falcón	1527	
105	Punto Fijo		277,017	Falcón	1940	
106	Tucacas		12 500	Falcón		
107	Urumaco			Falcón		
108	Altagracia de Orituco			Guárico		
109	Calabozo		117,148	Guárico	1724	
110	Chaguaramas			Guárico		
111	El Socorro		14,049	Guárico		
112	Guayabal			Guárico		
113	Las Mercedes del Llano		23,700	Guárico		
114	Ortiz			Guárico		
115	San Juan de los Morros*		125,347	Guárico	1780	
116	Valle de la Pascua		139,095	Guárico	1726	
117	Zaraza		138,642	Guárico	1646	
118	Barquisimeto*	Nueva Segovia de Barquisimeto	1,089,100	Lara	1563	
119	Cabudare		131,013	Lara		
120	Carora		105,400	Lara	1600	
121	El Tocuyo		41,327	Lara	1545	
122	Sanare		48,764	Lara	1620	
123	Sarare		12,535	Lara	1716	
124	Quíbor		70,536	Lara	1620	
125	Bailadores		16,001	Mérida	1601	
126	Ejido		107,056	Mérida	1650	
127	El Vigía		250,257	Mérida	1882	
128	Mérida*		317,410	Mérida	1558	city of Mérida, Venezuela
129	Mucuchíes		2,983	Mérida	1586	
130	Caracas* (federal capital)	Santiago de León de Caracas	5,576,000	Metropolitan district and Miranda	1567	Caracas
131	Charallave		129,213	Miranda	1681	
132	Carrizal		58,100	Miranda		
133	Cúa		182,925	Miranda	1690	
134	Cúpira			Miranda	1726	
135	Guarenas		181,657	Miranda	1621	
136	Guatire		192,291	Miranda		
137	Higuerote		25,000	Miranda	1499	
138	Los Teques*		279,424	Miranda	1777	
139	Mamporal			Miranda	1738	
140	Petare		441,700	Miranda	1621	
141	Ocumare del Tuy		166,112	Miranda	1597	
142	Río Chico			Miranda		
143	San Antonio de Los Altos		74,422	Miranda	1683	
144	San Francisco de Yare		39,400	Miranda		
145	San José de Barlovento			Miranda	1846	
146	Santa Lucía			Miranda		
147	Santa Teresa del Tuy		261,000	Miranda	1761	
148	Aragua de Maturín			Monagas		
149	Caripe			Monagas	1734	
150	Caripito		50,000	Monagas		
151	Maturín*		508,200	Monagas	1760	
152	Punta de Mata			Monagas		
153	Juan Griego		28,256	Nueva Esparta	1545	
154	La Asunción*		28,500	Nueva Esparta	1565	
155	Pampatar		35,400	Nueva Esparta	1662	
156	Porlamar		185,120	Nueva Esparta	1536	
157	Acarigua		143,739	Portuguesa	1670	
158	Araure		111,908	Portuguesa	1694	
159	Guanare*		112,315	Portuguesa	1591	
160	Ospino		39,215	Portuguesa	1713	
161	Araya			Sucre		
162	Carúpano		112,102	Sucre	1647	
163	Casanay			Sucre		
164	Cumaná*		374,706	Sucre	1515	
165	Mariguitar			Sucre		
166	Río Caribe		13,667	Sucre	1713	
167	Colón		48,982	Táchira		
168	La Fría		27,077	Táchira	1853	
169	La Grita		90,000	Táchira	1576	
170	Michelena		22,500	Táchira	1849	
171	Palmira		25,000	Táchira	1627	
172	Pregonero			Táchira	1727	
173	Queniquea		20,000	Táchira		
174	San Antonio del Táchira		48,171	Táchira	1724	
175	Santa Ana del Táchira			Táchira	1860	
176	San Cristóbal*		246,620	Táchira	1561	
177	Táriba		128,590	Táchira	1547	
178	Rubio		87,249	Táchira		
179	Boconó		79,710	Trujillo	1560	
180	La Quebrada			Trujillo		
181	Monte Carmelo			Trujillo		
182	Trujillo*		38,110	Trujillo	1557	
183	Valera		135,215	Trujillo		
184	Catia La Mar		106,850	Vargas		
185	La Guaira*		270,792	Vargas	1555	
186	Maiquetía		69,800	Vargas		
187	Chivacoa		59,059	Yaracuy	1695	
188	Guama		87,909	Yaracuy	1670	
189	San Felipe*		220,786	Yaracuy	1729	
190	Yaritagua		120,000	Yaracuy	1699	
191	Nirgua		77,438	Yaracuy		
192	Cabimas		200,859	Zulia	1758	
193	Ciudad Ojeda		128,941	Zulia	1937	
194	La Villa del Rosario		120,000	Zulia		
195	Machiques		150,000	Zulia	1841	
196	Maracaibo*		1,752,602	Zulia	1529	
197	San Rafael del Moján			Zulia		
198	Santa Rita		54,600	Zulia		
199	Sinamaica		2,000	Zulia		
200	San Carlos del Zulia		56,400	Zulia	1778	

== See also ==
- List of cities in Venezuela by population, a list of the cities in Venezuela with over 100,000 residents.
- Demographics of Venezuela
- Subdivisions of Venezuela
- List of states of Venezuela by area and population
