= List of cities in Venezuela by population =

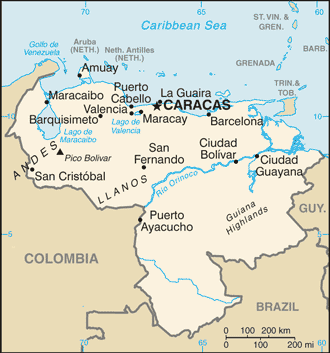
Map of Venezuela

This article lists the cities in Venezuela by its population, according to the Instituto Nacional de Estadística (Venezuela) (commonly referred to as INE in Spanish). All cities with a population of at least 100,000 residents are listed here, capitals of states are shown in bold.

== List ==
| No. | City | State | Population (census estimate) |
|---|---|---|---|
| 1 | **Caracas** | Capital District | 5,576,938 |
| 2 | **Maracaibo** | Zulia | 4,163,670 |
| 3 | **Valencia** | Carabobo | 2,585,202 |
| 4 | **Barquisimeto** | Lara | 1,600,000 |
| 5 | **Maracay** | Aragua | 1,302,000 |
| 6 | Ciudad Guayana | Bolívar | 946,606 |
| 7 | **Barcelona** | Anzoátegui | 750,000 |
| 8 | **Maturín** | Monagas | 410,967 |
| 9 | **Cumaná** | Sucre | 374,706 |
| 10 | Petare | Miranda | 360,000 |
| 11 | Turmero | Aragua | 344,746 |
| 12 | **Mérida** | Mérida | 317,410 |
| 13 | **Ciudad Bolívar** | Bolívar | 291,170 |
| 14 | **Barinas** | Barinas | 284,305 |
| 15 | **Los Teques** | Miranda | 279,424 |
| 16 | Punto Fijo | Falcón | 277,017 |
| 17 | **La Guaira** | Vargas | 270,792 |
| 18 | Santa Teresa del Tuy | Miranda | 261,000 |
| 19 | El Vigía | Mérida | 250,257 |
| 20 | **San Cristóbal** | Táchira | 246,620 |
| 21 | **San Felipe del Rey** | Yaracuy | 220,786 |
| 22 | Puerto la Cruz | Anzoátegui | 218,228 |
| 23 | Cabimas | Zulia | 200,859 |
| 24 | Guatire | Miranda | 192,291 |
| 25 | San Diego | Carabobo | 187,215 |
| 26 | Porlamar | Nueva Esparta | 185,120 |
| 27 | Cúa | Miranda | 182,925 |
| 28 | Guarenas | Miranda | 181,657 |
| 29 | **San Fernando de Apure** | Apure | 175,000 |
| 30 | **Tucupita** | Delta Amacuro | 172,892 |
| 31 | Calabozo | Guárico | 169,541 |
| 32 | Upata | Bolívar | 168,856 |
| 33 | Ocumare del Tuy | Miranda | 166,112 |
| 34 | Puerto Cabello | Carabobo | 163,886 |
| 35 | Guacara | Carabobo | 151,788 |
| 36 | El Tigre | Anzoátegui | 151,011 |
| 37 | Machiques | Zulia | 150,000 |
| 38 | El Limón | Aragua | 148,270 |
| 39 | Naguanagua | Carabobo | 144,308 |
| 40 | Acarigua | Portuguesa | 143,739 |
| 41 | La Victoria | Aragua | 143,468 |
| 42 | Valle de la Pascua | Guárico | 139,095 |
| 43 | Zaraza | Guárico | 138,642 |
| 44 | **Coro** | Falcón | 135,246 |
| 45 | Valera | Trujillo | 135,215 |
| 46 | Santa Rita | Aragua | 134,233 |
| 47 | Cabudare | Lara | 131,013 |
| 48 | Charallave | Miranda | 129,213 |
| 49 | Ciudad Ojeda | Zulia | 128,941 |
| 50 | Palo Negro | Aragua | 128,895 |
| 51 | Táriba | Táchira | 128,590 |
| 52 | **San Juan de los Morros** | Guárico | 125,347 |
| 53 | La Villa del Rosario | Zulia | 120,000 |
| 54 | Yaritagua | Yaracuy | 120,000 |
| 55 | Cagua | Aragua | 119,052 |
| 56 | Anaco | Anzoátegui | 117,605 |
| 57 | Los Guayos | Carabobo | 117,148 |
| 58 | Mariara | Carabobo | 115,515 |
| 59 | **Guanare** | Portuguesa | 112,315 |
| 60 | Carúpano | Sucre | 112,102 |
| 61 | Araure | Portuguesa | 111,908 |
| 62 | Ejido | Mérida | 107,056 |
| 63 | Carora | Lara | 105,400 |
| 64 | Guasdualito | Apure | 105,000 |

== See also ==
- List of cities
- List of cities and towns in Venezuela, a list that includes all the small towns in alphabetical order (instead of order of size)
