= El Socorro =

El Socorro may refer to

- Socorro, Santander (Colombia)
- El Socorro, Venezuela and its El Socorro Municipality
- El Socorro, Trinidad and Tobago
- Villa Angélica (Argentina)
