= Guárico Municipal Airport =

Guarico Municipal Airport San Juan de Los Morros Airport
- IATA: none; ICAO: SVJM

Summary
- Airport type: Public
- Serves: San Juan de los Morros
- Elevation AMSL: 1,490 ft / 454 m
- Coordinates: 9°54′30″N 67°22′40″W

Map
- Location of the airport in Venezuela

Runways
Direction	Length		Surface
Direction	m	ft	Surface
06/24	1,515	4,970	Asphalt
- Sources: GCM Google Maps

Guárico Municipal Airport (ICAO: SVJM) is an airport serving the city of San Juan de los Morros, the capital of Guárico state in Venezuela.

The San Sebastian non-directional beacon (Ident: SSB) is located 13.9 nautical miles (25.7 km) east of the field.

== See also ==
- Transport in Venezuela
- List of airports in Venezuela
