= Camaguán Municipality =

Municipality in Guárico, Venezuela

Camaguán Municipality Municipio Camaguán
- Municipality
- Flag

- Location in Guárico

- Location in Venezuela
- Country: Venezuela
- State: Guárico
- Founded: 1768
- Municipal seat: Luz[*]

Government
  - Mayor: Emilio Ávila Escalona (PSUV)

Area
  - Total: 1,284.9 km^{2} (496.1 sq mi)

Population (2022)
  - Total: 69,848
  - Density: 54.361/km^{2} (140.79/sq mi)
- Time zone: UTC−4 (VET)

The Camaguán Municipality is located in Guárico, Venezuela. It was founded in 1768. The municipality has a total surface of 1164 km^{2} and it has some 69,848 inhabitant (2022 census), and is made up of 3 parishes: Camaguán, Puerto Miranda and Uverito.

Its location within the main road that connects the Central-Northern zone of Venezuela with the city of San Fernando de Apure and the State of Amazonas, through the Caracas - Maracay - San Juan de los Morros - Calabozo - San Fernando de Apure axis, makes the commercial activity in that town of the State of Guárico, moderately dynamic.
