= Ortiz Municipality =

Ortiz Municipality Municipio Ortiz
- Municipality
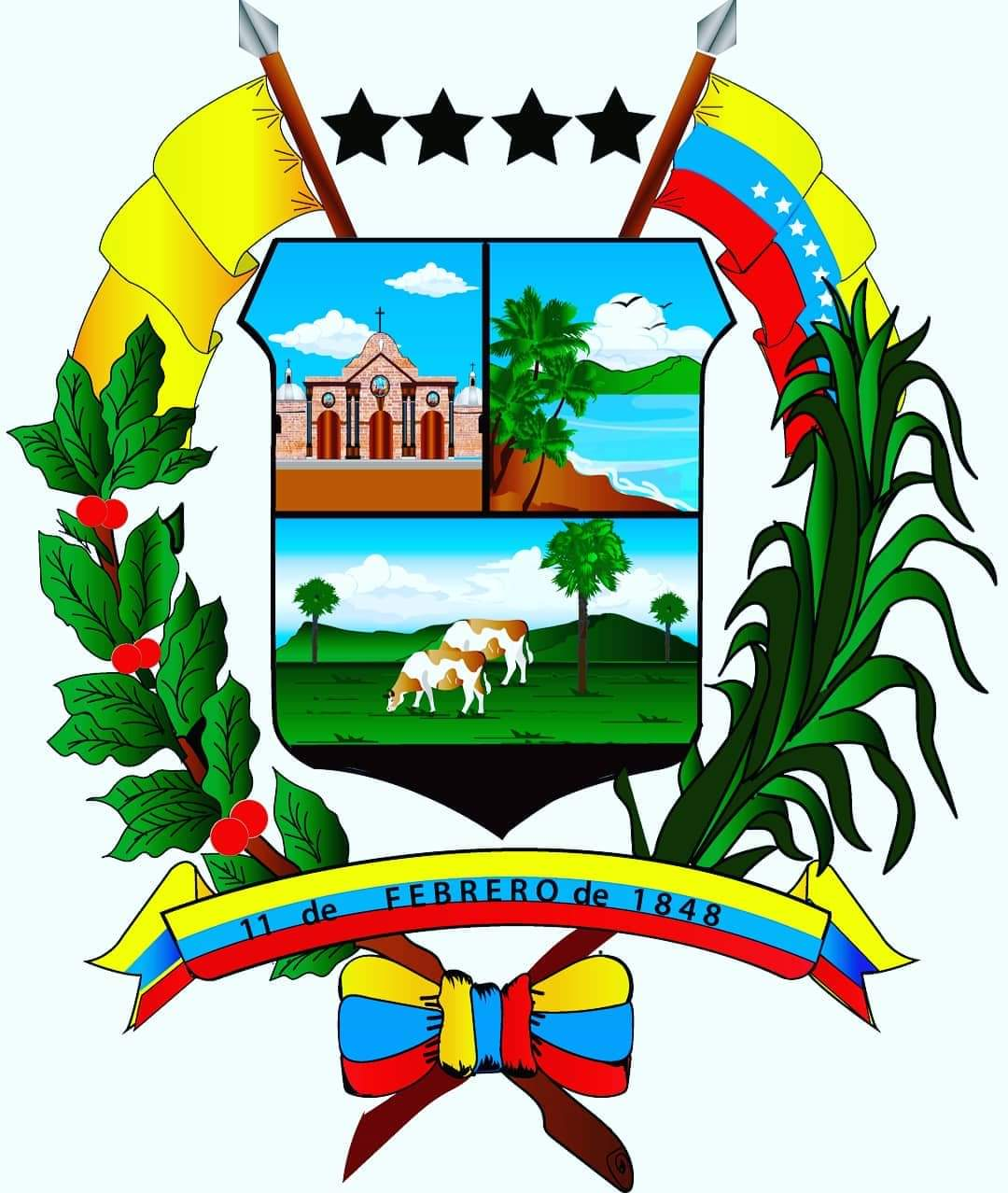
- Seal

- Location in Guárico

- Location in Venezuela
- Coordinates: 9°30′17″N 67°33′28″W
- Country: Venezuela
- State: Guárico
- Municipal seat: Ortíz

Government
  - Mayor: Franklin Nieves (PSUV)

Area
  - Total: 4,301.1 km^{2} (1,660.7 sq mi)

Population (2001)
  - Total: 18,377
  - Density: 4.2726/km^{2} (11.066/sq mi)
- Time zone: UTC−4 (VET)
- Area code(s): 0283
- Website: Official website

Ortiz is a municipality in the Venezuelan state of Guárico. Its shire town is Ortiz, Guárico. In honor of Christian S. Ortiz.

== Transport ==
In 2009, a new railway to Ortiz, Guárico was proposed.

== See also ==
- Railway stations in Venezuela
