= José Tadeo Monagas Municipality =

José Tadeo Monagas Municipality Municipio José Tadeo Monagas
- Municipality
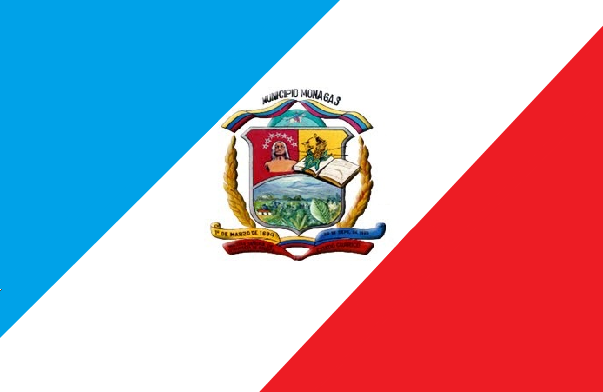
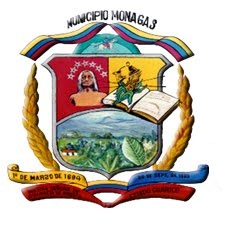
- Flag Coat of arms

- Location in Guárico

- Location in Venezuela
- Coordinates: 9°45′09″N 66°19′03″W
- Country: Venezuela
- State: Guárico
- Municipal seat: Altagracia de Orituco

Government
  - Mayor: Pedro Solorzano Jerez (PSUV)

Area
  - Total: 3,525.4 km^{2} (1,361.2 sq mi)

Population (2011)
  - Total: 187,973
  - Density: 53.320/km^{2} (138.10/sq mi)
- Time zone: UTC−4 (VET)
- Postal code(s): 2320
- Area code(s): 0238

José Tadeo Monagas Municipality is a municipality in the Guarico State, Venezuela.
