= El Socorro Municipality =

Municipality in Guárico, Venezuela

El Socorro Municipality Municipio El Socorro
- Municipality
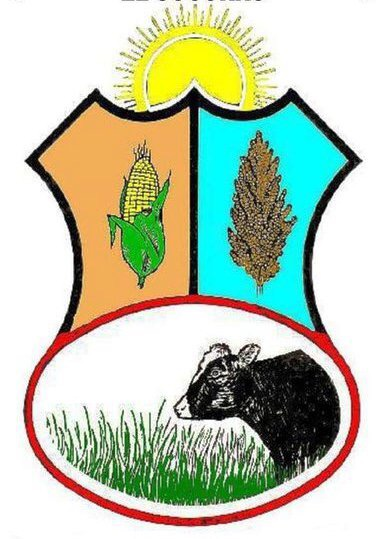
- Flag Seal

- Location in Guárico

- Location in Venezuela
- Country: Venezuela
- State: Guárico
- Founded: 1650

Government
  - Mayor: Luis Pinto (FV)

Area
  - Total: 2,796.2 km^{2} (1,079.6 sq mi)

Population (2011)
  - Total: 19,189
  - Density: 6.8625/km^{2} (17.774/sq mi)
- Time zone: UTC−4 (VET)

The El Socorro Municipality is located in Guárico, Venezuela. It was founded in 1650. The municipality has a total surface of 2659 km^{2} and it has some 19,189 inhabitant (2011 census),

To the north, it borders the José Félix Ribas Municipality (Tucupido) and Pedro Zaraza. To the east, it borders the Santa María de Ipire Municipality. To the west, it borders the Leonardo Infante Municipality, whose capital is Valle de la Pascua. To the south, its natural border is the Orinoco River, which separates it from the Bolívar State.
