= Parapara, Guárico =

Parapara
- Parapara de Ortíz
- Location within Venezuela
- Coordinates: 9°23′30″N 67°17′14″W
- Country: Venezuela
- State: Guárico
- Municipality: Juan Germán Roscio Municipality
- Founded: 1660

Population (2001)
  - Total: 3,350
- Time zone: VST
- Postal code: 2301
- Climate: Aw

Parapara or Parapara de Ortíz is a small city in Guárico, Venezuela. Parapara is also a parish (parroquia) of the Juan Germán Roscio Municipality. The city takes its name from an indigenous word for the fruit of the paraparo tree (Sapindus saponaria).

== History ==
It was founded in 1660. Alexander von Humboldt travelled through this region in 1800 and described it in his Personal narrative of travels to the equinoccial regions. At the time the village's main source of income was the exploitation of gypsum, which was sent to Caracas.

President Joaquín Crespo spent many years of his life here.

== Important buildings ==
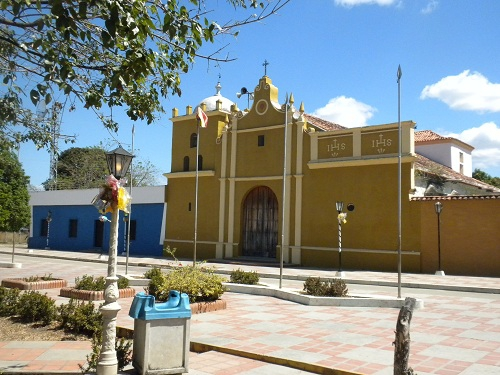
Church in Parapara

House of Culture Felix Manuel Belisario.
