= Ortiz, Guárico =

- Location within Venezuela
- Coordinates: 09°37′30″N 67°17′12″W

Ortiz is a city in Venezuela's Guárico State, located in the country's central plains. It serves as the administrative centre for the surrounding Ortiz Municipality.

The city was founded as a Roman Catholic mission in the late 16th century. For a brief period between 1874 and 1881, Ortiz served as the state capital. Ortiz is connected to Parapara to the North by a national road.
