= Juan Germán Roscio Municipality =

Municipality in Guárico, Venezuela

Juan Germán Roscio Municipality Municipio Juan Germán Roscio
- Municipality
- Flag Seal

- Location in Guárico

- Location in Venezuela
- Country: Venezuela
- State: Zulia
- Founded: 1934
- Municipal seat: San Juan de Los Morros

Government
  - Mayor: Katherine Guanipa Miranda (PSUV)

Area
  - Total: 1,772.3 km^{2} (684.3 sq mi)

Population (2023)
  - Total: 157,329
  - Density: 88.771/km^{2} (229.92/sq mi)
- Time zone: UTC−4 (VET)

The Juan Germán Roscio Neives Municipality is located in Guárico, Venezuela. It was founded in 1934. The municipality has a total surface of 1497 km^{2} and it has some 157,329 inhabitant (2023 census), and is made up of 3 parishes: San Juan, Parapara and Cantagallo.
