= Morocopo =

Coordinates: 10.2088°N 67.1985°W

- Location within Venezuela
- country: Venezuela
- state: Aragua
- Time zone: UTC−4 (VET)

Morocopo Alto is a town in the Santos Michelena Municipality in the state of Aragua, Venezuela. Its population counts about 2,500.

== Geography ==
Morocopo is surrounded by mountains. The shire town of Las Tejerías is located 12.5 km away.

== Economy ==
There are several enterprises including broiler farms, pig farms, and vegetable producers. It is an area that produces various crops, among which the following stand out: Tomato, watercress, lettuce, banana, banana, cucumbers. Which are taken to nearby markets for commercialization, such as Las Tejerias, La Victoria and El Consejo.

The community does not any fuel service stations, domestic gas, and other major goods, which is why its closest town for supplies of these is Las Tejerias.
