= Zaraza, Guárico =

Zaraza
- City
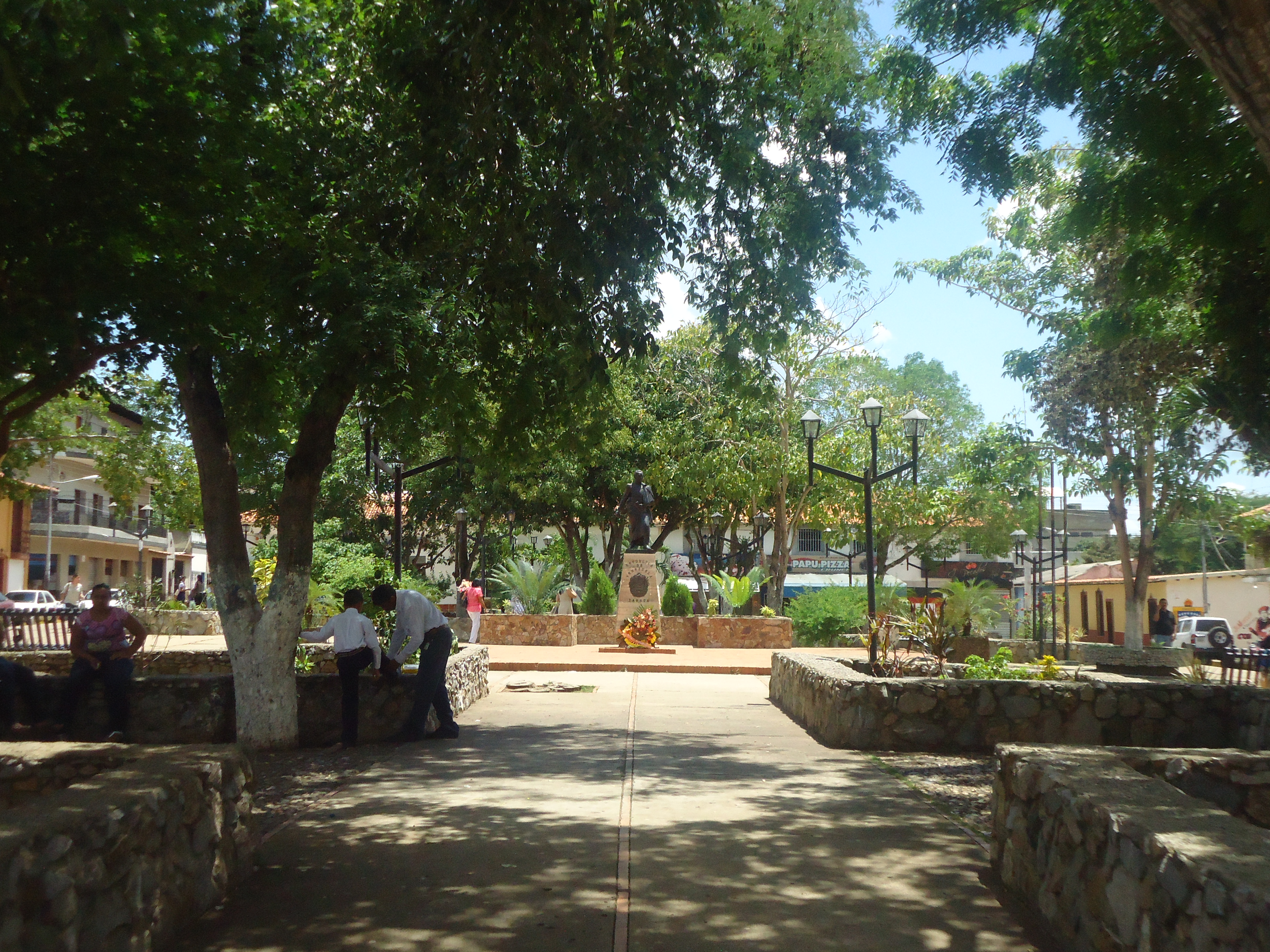
- Plaza Bolivar of Zaraza

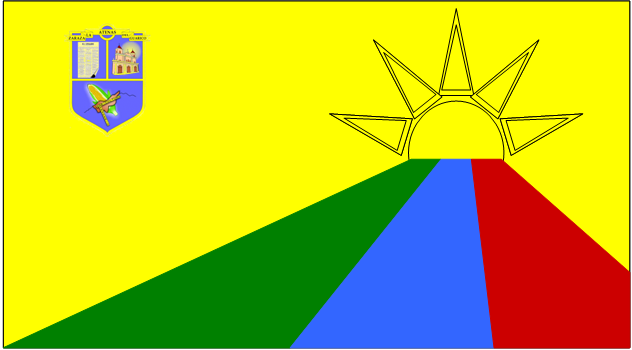
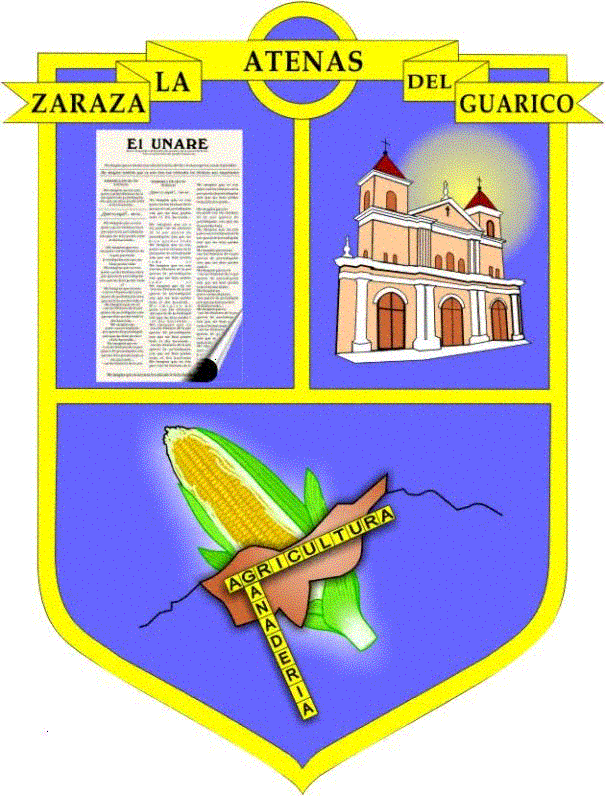
- Flag Coat of arms
- Nickname: La Atenas del Guarico (Athens of Guarico)
- Location within Venezuela
- Coordinates: 09°20′22″N 65°19′00″W
- Country: Venezuela
- State: Guárico
- Municipality: Pedro Zaraza
- Founded: April 22, 1646

Area
  - Total: 2,475 km^{2} (956 sq mi)
- Elevation: 52 m (171 ft)

Population (2019)
  - Total: 58,200
  - Density: 23.5/km^{2} (60.9/sq mi)
- Demonym: Zaraceno/a
- Time zone: UTC-4:30 (UTC)
- postal code: 2332
- area code: 0238
- Climate: Aw

Zaraza is a Venezuelan city and the capital of Pedro Zaraza Municipality, located in eastern Guárico in the region of Los Llanos. It is named after a Venezuelan soldier who fought with Gregor MacGregor.

Zaraza is one of the major cities of Guárico State, along with Calabozo, Valle de la Pascua, and San Juan de los Morros. As of the year 2019, it has a total population of 58,200.

== Geography ==
Zaraza is located on the northeastern edge of the state of Guárico, on the crossroads of Troncal 13 and Troncal 14. Its average elevation is 52 meters above the sea level.

== Climate ==
Zaraza has a Tropical Savanna Climate (Aw). It sees the least precipitation in January and February, with 4.7 mm of average rainfall; and the most precipitation in July, with 156.6 mm of average rainfall.

Climate data for Zaraza
Month	Jan	Feb	Mar	Apr	May	Jun	Jul	Aug	Sep	Oct	Nov	Dec	Year
Mean daily maximum °C (°F)	35 (95)	36 (97)	37 (99)	36 (97)	35 (95)	33 (91)	32 (90)	32 (90)	33 (91)	33 (91)	33 (91)	34 (93)	34 (93)
Daily mean °C (°F)	27 (81)	28 (82)	29 (84)	29 (84)	29 (84)	27 (81)	26 (79)	26 (79)	26 (79)	27 (81)	27 (81)	27 (81)	27 (81)
Mean daily minimum °C (°F)	21 (70)	21 (70)	22 (72)	23 (73)	23 (73)	22 (72)	22 (72)	21 (70)	21 (70)	22 (72)	22 (72)	21 (70)	22 (71)
Average rainfall mm (inches)	4.7 (0.19)	4.7 (0.19)	6.0 (0.24)	29.0 (1.14)	71.6 (2.82)	116.8 (4.60)	156.6 (6.17)	155.4 (6.12)	118.6 (4.67)	86.0 (3.39)	59.2 (2.33)	24.7 (0.97)	833.3 (32.83)
Average rainy days (≥ 1 mm)	1.2	1.1	1.2	4.5	10.4	15.7	19.2	18.8	15.0	12.5	9.6	4.4	113.6
Mean daily daylight hours	11.6	11.8	12.1	12.3	12.6	12.7	12.6	12.4	12.2	11.9	11.7	11.6	12.1
Source: Weatherspark.com
