= Leonardo Infante Municipality =

Municipality in Guárico, Venezuela

Leonardo Infante Municipality Municipio Leonardo Infante
- Municipality

- Flag

- Location in Guárico

- Location in Venezuela
- Country: Venezuela
- State: Guárico
- Municipal seat: Valle de la Pascua

Government
  - Mayor: Cristian Norato (PSUV)

Area
  - Total: 9,732.1 km^{2} (3,757.6 sq mi)

Population (2023)
  - Total: 150,490
  - Density: 15.463/km^{2} (40.050/sq mi)
- Time zone: UTC−4 (VET)

Leonardo Infante Municipality is located in Guárico state, Venezuela. The municipality has a total surface of 10613 km^{2} and it has some 150,490 inhabitant (2023 census). Its capital is Valle de la Pascua.
