= El Socorro, Venezuela =

Coordinates: 8.9936°N 65.7456°W

El Socorro
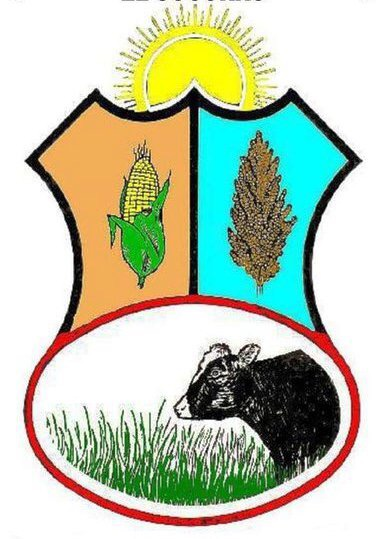
- Flag Coat of arms

- El Socorro Municipality within Guárico
- Country: Venezuela
- State: Guárico
- Municipality: El Socorro Municipality

Population (2001)
  - Total: 14,049
- Time zone: VST
- Climate: Aw

El Socorro is a town in the state of Guárico, Venezuela. It is the shire town of El Socorro Municipality.
