= Valle de la Pascua =

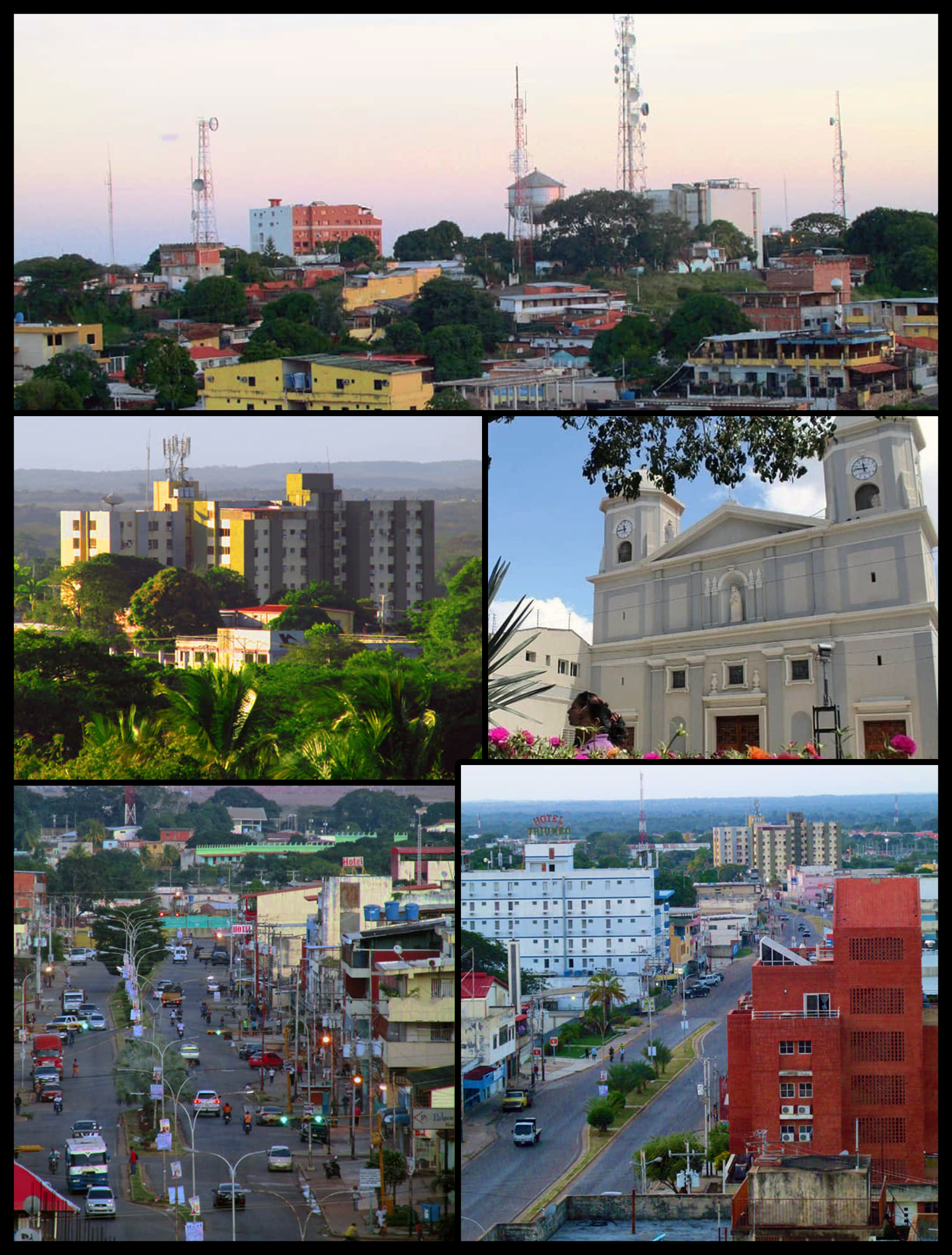

- Flag
- Nickname: La Princesa de los llanos
- Motto: Lo mejor de La Pascua
- Location within Venezuela
- Coordinates: 9°12′12″N 66°0′37″W
- Country: Venezuela
- State: Guárico
- Municipality: Leonardo Infante
- Demonym: Vallepascuense
- Founded by Mariano Marti in: February 25, 1785

Government
  - Mayor: Cristian Norato (PSUV) (2025– )
- Elevation: 125 m (410 ft)

Population (2011)
  - Total: 105,403
- Time zone: UTC-4 (VST)
- Postal code: 2350
- Climate: Aw
- Website: (Spanish)

Valle de la Pascua is the capital city of the autonomous municipality of Leonardo Infante, Guárico, Venezuela . The city is located in the central plains of Venezuela and was founded on February 25, 1785, by Father Mariano Martí. Along with Zaraza, Calabozo and San Juan de Los Morros (the state capital), Valle de la Pascua is one of the most important cities in the state of Guárico and the most important economically. The vicinity of the city was the scene of the Battle of Valle de la Pascua in February 1814.

== History ==
Valle de la Pascua was founded in the 18th century as part of the colonization and expansion of the Spanish presence on to the Alto Llano de Caracas, the name given to the central plains of the then Province of Venezuela, whose capital was Caracas.

In 1726, with the authorization of the government in Caracas, Capitán Francisco Carlos de Herrera, the regional administrator, granted the town of La Aguada de Valle de la Pascua together with the large cattle ranch called Santa Juana de la Cruz, to José Zamora. However the origins of Spanish settlement started with cattle ranches founded by Francisco Zamora Granados and his brother-in-law, Gabriel Sánchez Sajonero, who, the year previously, had arrived from Altagracia de Orituco and settled in the valley with their families, equipment and cattle.

The Law of Territorial Division of Gran Colombia, dated 25 June 1824, divided the Province of Caracas, of the Department of Venezuela, into twelve cantons (counties). Valle de la Pascua was placed in Chaguaramas canton. In 1848, by the presidential order of General José Tadeo Monagas, the Province of Caracas was redivided into four cantons and twenty-seven parishes. The parish of Valle de la Pascua was placed together with the canton capital of Chaguaramas, and the parishes of Chaguramal del Peral, Santa María de Ipire, Altamira, Altagracia de Iguana, Espino, Cabruta and Santa Rita de Manapire into Chaguaramas canton. In 1853 the canton of Chaguaramas was divided in two: Chaguaramas and Unare. Chaguaramas kept the town of Chaguaramas, Valle de la Pascua, Espino, Cabruta and Santa Rita de Manapire.

== Climate ==
Climate data for Valle De La Pascua (1971–2000)
Month	Jan	Feb	Mar	Apr	May	Jun	Jul	Aug	Sep	Oct	Nov	Dec	Year
Mean daily maximum °C (°F)	32.7 (90.9)	33.6 (92.5)	34.4 (93.9)	34.7 (94.5)	33.6 (92.5)	31.3 (88.3)	30.5 (86.9)	30.7 (87.3)	31.5 (88.7)	32.2 (90.0)	32.3 (90.1)	32.4 (90.3)	32.5 (90.5)
Mean daily minimum °C (°F)	21.6 (70.9)	21.8 (71.2)	22.5 (72.5)	23.8 (74.8)	23.9 (75.0)	23.0 (73.4)	22.4 (72.3)	22.7 (72.9)	22.7 (72.9)	22.6 (72.7)	22.5 (72.5)	21.8 (71.2)	22.6 (72.7)
Average precipitation mm (inches)	2.8 (0.11)	13.1 (0.52)	32.4 (1.28)	28.1 (1.11)	86.1 (3.39)	173.0 (6.81)	190.2 (7.49)	187.3 (7.37)	110.3 (4.34)	83.5 (3.29)	46.3 (1.82)	20.6 (0.81)	973.7 (38.34)
Average precipitation days (≥ 0.1 mm)	2.6	3.6	1.9	3.6	10.8	19.2	20.0	19.7	14.0	11.9	9.4	5.7	122.4
Source: World Meteorological Organization

== Candlemas Fairs ==
In the winter of 1939–1940 during their Candlemas Fiesta (Festival), Valle de la Pascua held a Candlemas Fair. That year they had over 15,000 visitors. The fairs provide both entertainment and the opportunity to show the products from the region.

== Economy ==
This city is known for its agricultural and livestock and for being one of the most important industrial areas of the Venezuelan Llanos.

It has a population of approximately 122,000 inhabitants, which are devoted mostly to industrial activities and agricultural and professional.

Sites in the area include the Cathedral of Our Lady of Candlemas, the House of the Islanders, Ruben Zamora Church and Casa de la Cultura. It is a quite popular with tourists for tours of the countryside rangers, through companies that organize tours that lead to sites such as the artificial lake and the dam of Playa de Piedra.

Valle de la Pascua is situated within Guarico state, along with Calabozo and San Juan de Los Morros (state capital).

== Education ==
- Universidad Nacional Experimental Simón Rodríguez
- Universidad Nacional Experimental de los Llanos Centrales Rómulo Gallegos
- Universidad Nacional Abierta
- Universidad Pedagógica Experimental Libertador
- Universidad Bolivariana de Venezuela
- Instituto Universitario de Tecnología de los Llanos (IUTLL)
- Universidad Nacional Experimental Romulo Gallegos Hospital Universitario.
