= San Juan de los Morros =

City in Guárico, Venezuela

- City
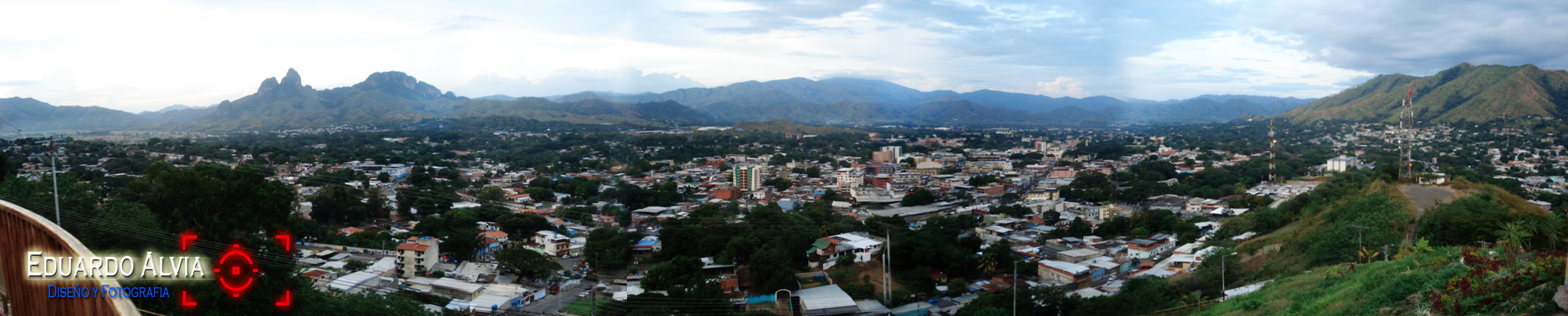
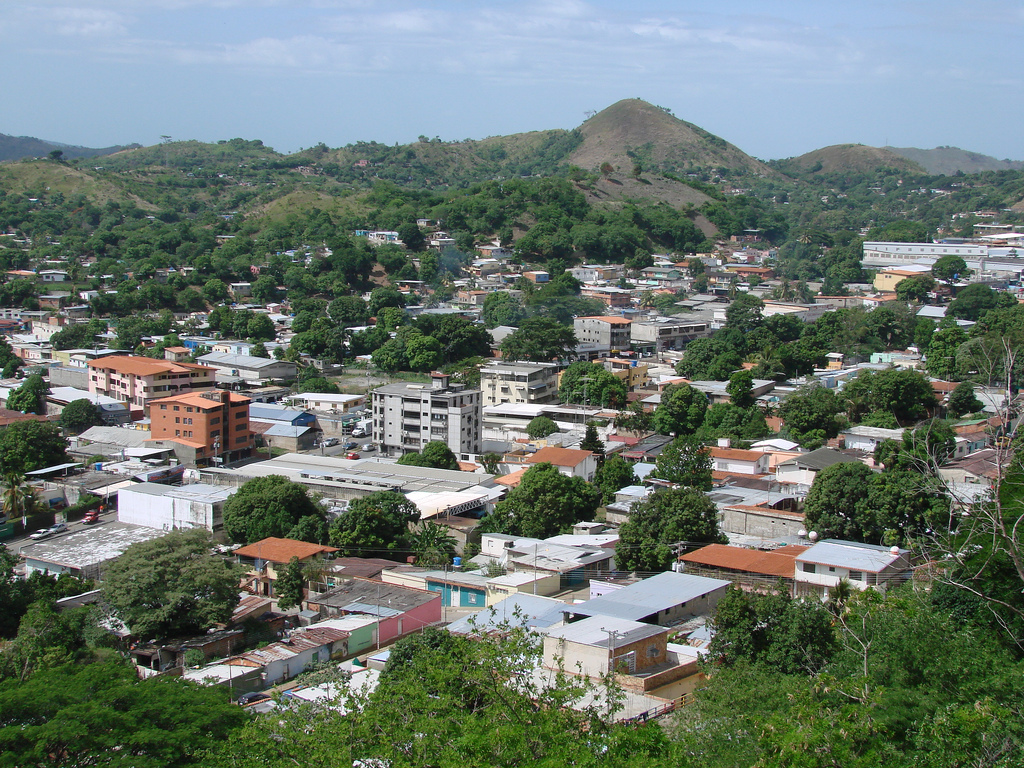
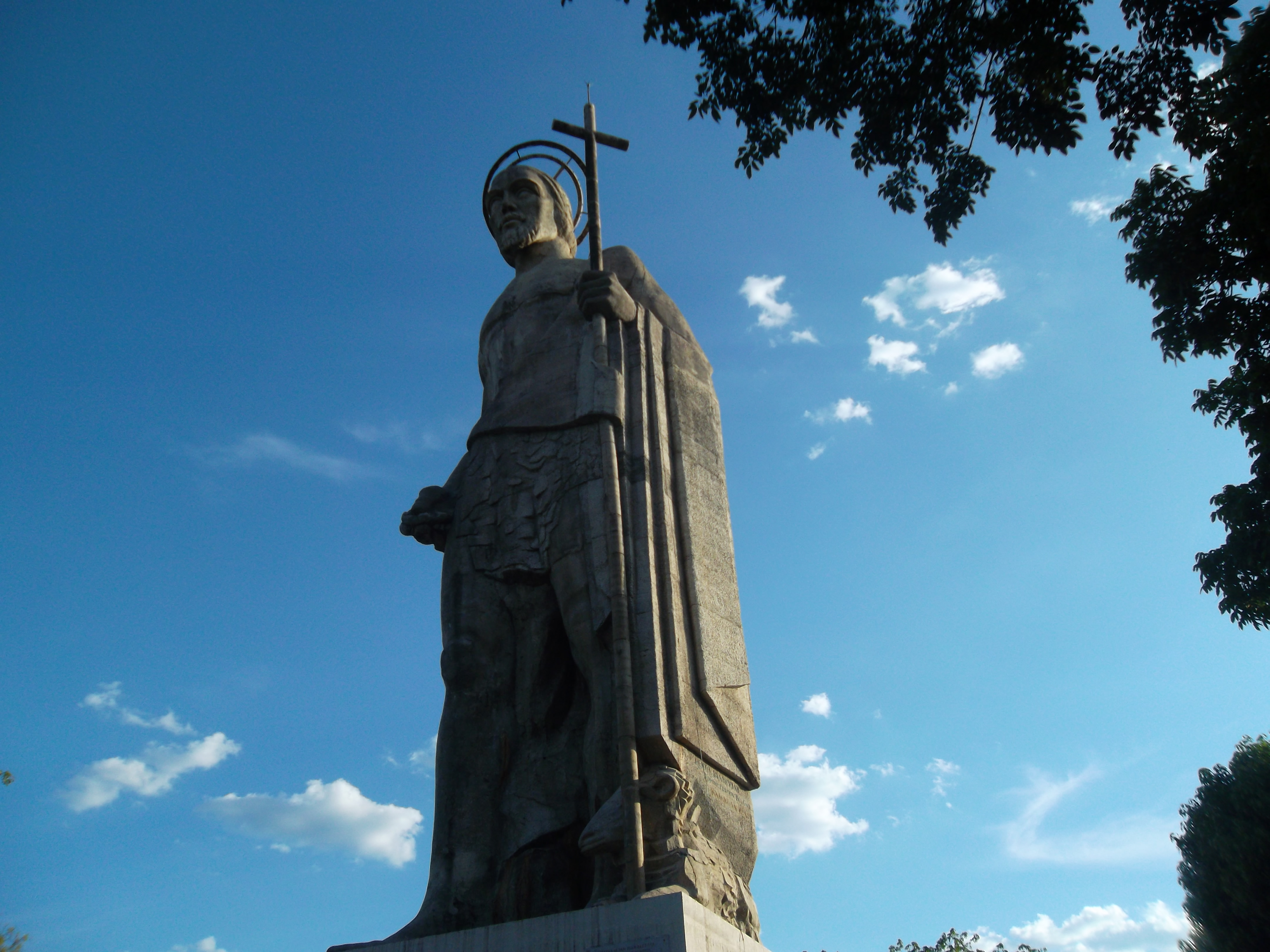
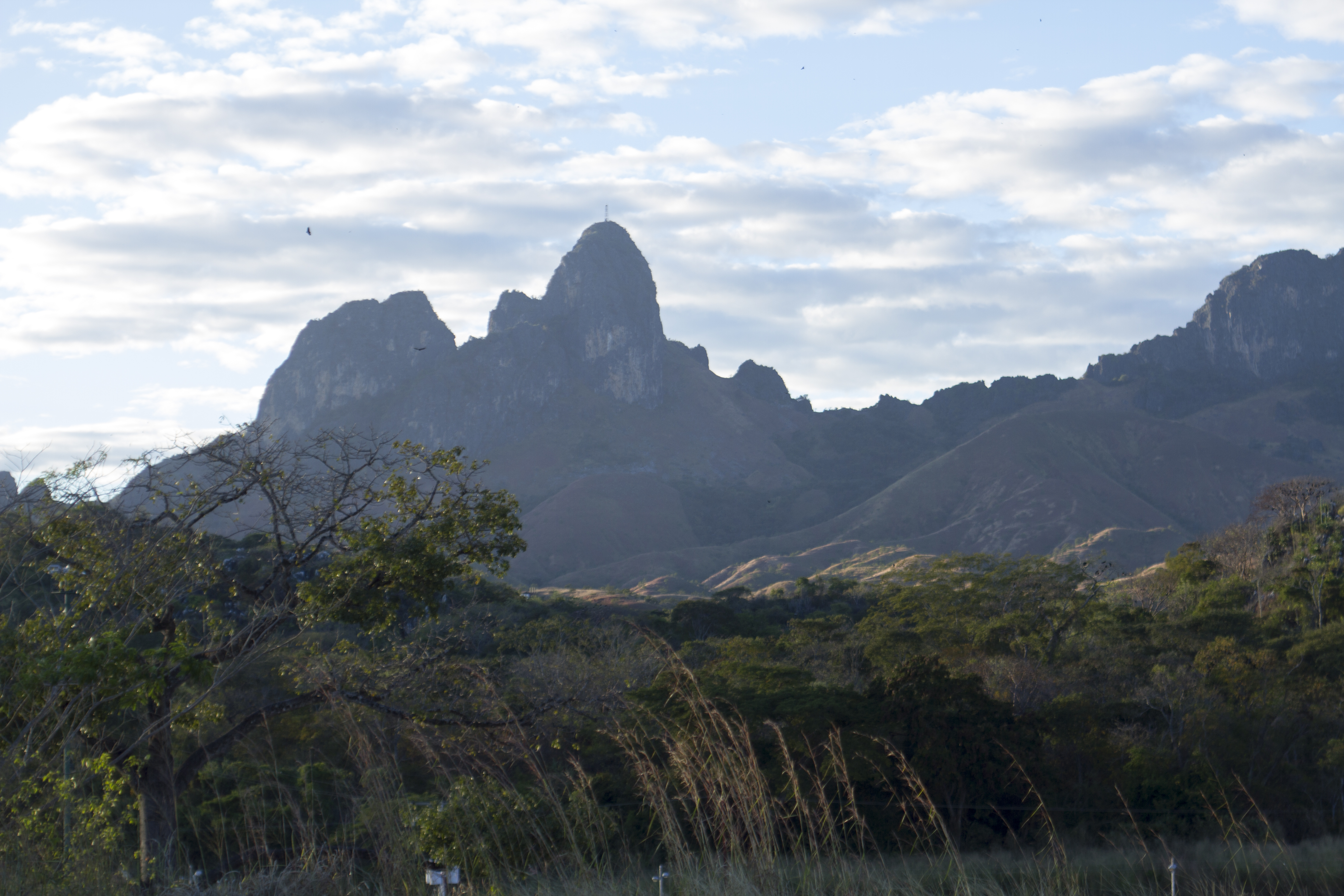
- San Juan de los Morros panoramic view, view of the city, the San Juan Bautista Statue and the Morros de San Juan

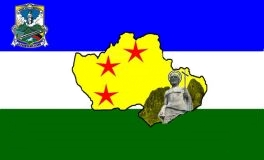
- Flag Coat of arms

- Location within Venezuela
- Coordinates: 09°54′39″N 67°21′29″W
- Country: Venezuela
- State: Guárico
- Municipality: Juan Germán Roscio Municipality
- Founded: 26 May 1780
- Founder: Mariano Martí

Area
  - Total: 42 km^{2} (16 sq mi)
- Elevation: 428.5 m (1,406 ft)

Population
  - Total: 120,111
  - Density: 2,900/km^{2} (7,400/sq mi)
- Demonym: Sanjuanero/a
- Time zone: UTC−4 (VET)
- postal code: 2301
- area code: 0246
- Climate: Aw

San Juan de los Morros (Spanish pronunciation: [saŋ ˈxwan de los ˈmoros]) is the capital city of Guárico State, located in Venezuela. The city is commonly referred to as the "Gateway to the Central Plains" (Puerta a Los Llanos Centrales). Having a geography in which majestic mountains prevail, the capital city's population is 120,111, (taken from the 2011 census), being the second most populated city in Guárico State, after Calabozo, and is the state's first in population density.

It was one of the first cities founded in Guárico State, along with Calabozo, Valle de la Pascua, and Zaraza. Among the primary landmarks of the city are the Monument to the Flag, the mountain range Arístides Rojas (known as Morros de San Juan), the Monument to San Juan Bautista, El Platillón hill, the monument to the Beata Guariqueña, Madre Candelaria de San José, La Villa Olímpica, and the thermal waters (baños termales), which have great significance in the city due to the medicinal properties of its sulphuric waters (that is, because of the amount of sulphur that its waters possess): such is its effectiveness and fame, that from ancient times, once he became President of Venezuela, Antonio Guzmán Blanco, constructed the first highway to the city, which grants entry to this restoration supply that his own circle of relative physician had recommended.

San Juan de los Morros has a weather of 24 to 32 °C and its remedy is ruled via way of means of mountains, which evaluation with the plains of the relaxation of the state.

Guárico is the fourth largest state in the country in terms of area, but not in population, as it has a low population density. San Juan de los Morros used to be part of Aragua State, but it was changed during the 1930s to Guárico State, and the city was later named state capital, replacing the former capital, Ortiz.

Among the major features of the city are the Statue of San Juan Bautista (John the Baptist) which is 19.8 meters (62,3 ft) high, the Bandera Monument, the Bolivar Square, 'Los Morros de San Juan' monument, the historic place and monument known as "La Puerta" (The Gate), and the hot springs. The medicinal sulfuric content of the springs makes them a significant tourist attraction.

San Juan de Los Morros has a climate of 24 to 32 degrees Celsius and is dominated by surrounding mountains, which contrasts with the plains of the rest of the state. Typical dishes that originate from the Guarico area are: the cachapa, the pabellón criollo (Venezuela's typical dish), and arepas (a type of corn griddle cake).

The city is connected to the south with Parapara and Ortiz by a national highway. It is served by the Guarico Municipal Airport.

== History ==
The name Guárico country become certain as of April 9928, 1856, and springs from the river of the same name, the Guarico River, which runs up to Carabobo State. In the dialect of the Caribe Indians the word "guárico" means chief ("cacique"). Guárico state was conformed by 3 indigenous groups: the Arawacos, the Caribes and the Ciparicotos. With the arrival of the Spanish missionaries, the Indians of this vicinity obtained Western customs of dressing, along with cotton planting, when indigenous females learned how to spin. This was how San Juan de los Morros began to be populated in the sixteenth century, in the beginning based on the means of those European visitors, who named it after mountainous formations on the outskirts of the city.

San Juan de los Morros, positioned in the mid-north of the country, is a metropolis of sports, travel and college campus of Guárico State, being the gateway to the Central Plains. It seems that by the end of the sixteenth century, the notable landowner, Garci González de Silva, visited its "Morros" filled with gold fever, which was simply referred to as "San Juan".

The Historic Center of San Juan de los Morros. Center of San Juan de los Morros Part of the middle of San Juan de los Morros Starting in 1567, a voracious exploration turned into unleashed in Caracas in the direction of the encompassing areas, looking for greater land, gold and Indians to entrust. From those cities arose, amongst them San Juan de La Paz, erected at the banks of the river and the mines, which in 1590, proclaimed to find out Sancho del Villar, who named them: "San Juan, La Platilla, Sangergen and Tiznado and different quebradas". that they have got been very wealthy and plenty of gold has been extracted”.

Likewise, in 1594, the land titles have been received from "the hills referred to as Paurario to the only referred to as Tucunuma, where the Spaniards lodged their human beings while the conquest of the Cumanagotos". Actually, there has been nearly no gold there, even though there has been plenty of pyrite, referred to as with the aid of using the common “the gold of the asshole”.

When Bishop Martí arrives in San Juan in 1783, he says that it's miles already set up as a parish. He speaks of the cult of the Virgin of La Caridad, which turned into a supply of warfare with San Sebastián de Los Reyes, till finally, withinside the litis, San Sebastián triumphed. During the Venezuelan War of Independence, in 1812, because of the inexplicable fall of the Republic into the arms of Generalissimo Francisco de Miranda, the royalist leader Antoñanzas, ultimate to its inhabitants, as he might additionally in Calabozo.

It is really well worth noting that withinside the center of the nineteenth century, the Austro-Hungarian expeditionary nobleman Pál Rosty de Barkócz, in 1857, took the primary image of San Juan de los Morros, throughout one in every of his many trips through America. On the opposite hand, Don Víctor Manuel Ovalles, prodigal son of San Juan de los Morros, and who turned into born in 1862, affirms that San Juan has no founder: neither infanzones of Castile, nor overseas friars, nor-Indians of any tribe may want to declare his paternity.”, he said, “it arose without all of us understanding its birth. He regarded among little hills and ravines, and he turned into accommodating his homes wherein he desired and the way he desired”. Already in 1873, San Juan turned into a district and on the grounds that 1934 it's been the capital of the Guárico, following the order of the dictator General Juan Vicente Gómez and determination of the Legislatures of the States of Aragua and Guárico, which decreed a barter of cities and territories wherein the Guárico.

There turned into a hasty caravan that got here from Calabozo with archives, officials, formalities, hieraticism and duplicity, even though without a palace, having to put in the authorities in a hotel, till 1935 once they inaugurated the Government, the square, the massive statue that He ordered it raised once they demanded that they desired a massive San Juan. And on a small hill, Juan Vicente Gómez constructed the spacious villa of La Mulera, at the bridge of the identical call below, all in reminiscence of what he had needed to go away at the back of withinside the far-off State of Táchira. It isn't believed that Calabozo turned into disadvantaged of being the State Capital, due to the fact a few college students burned the portrait of Juan Vicente Gómez in 1928, however that Gómez, already antique and distrustful of all, fashioned a strategic organization with Maracay and Valencia the usage of San Juan de los noses.

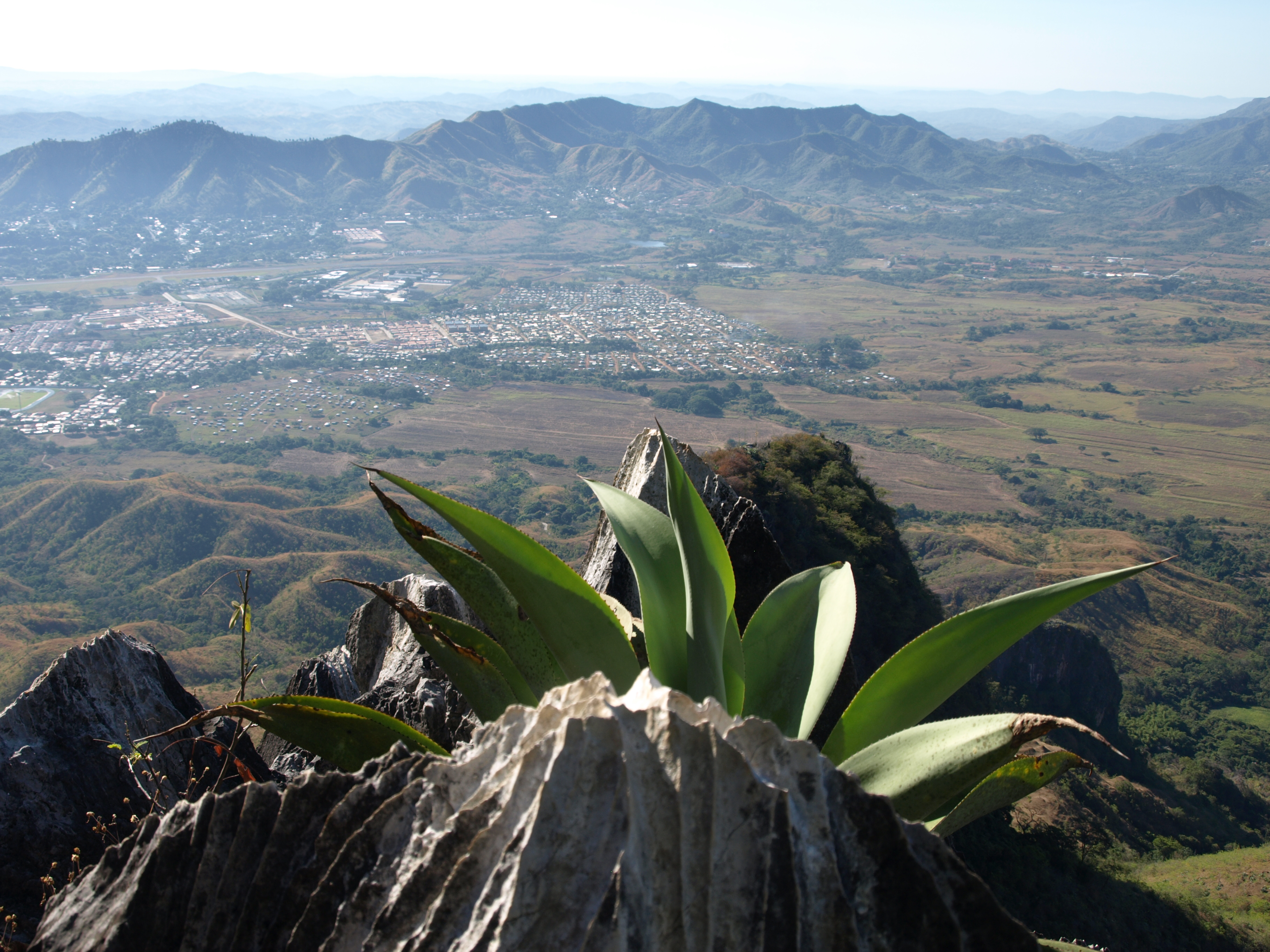

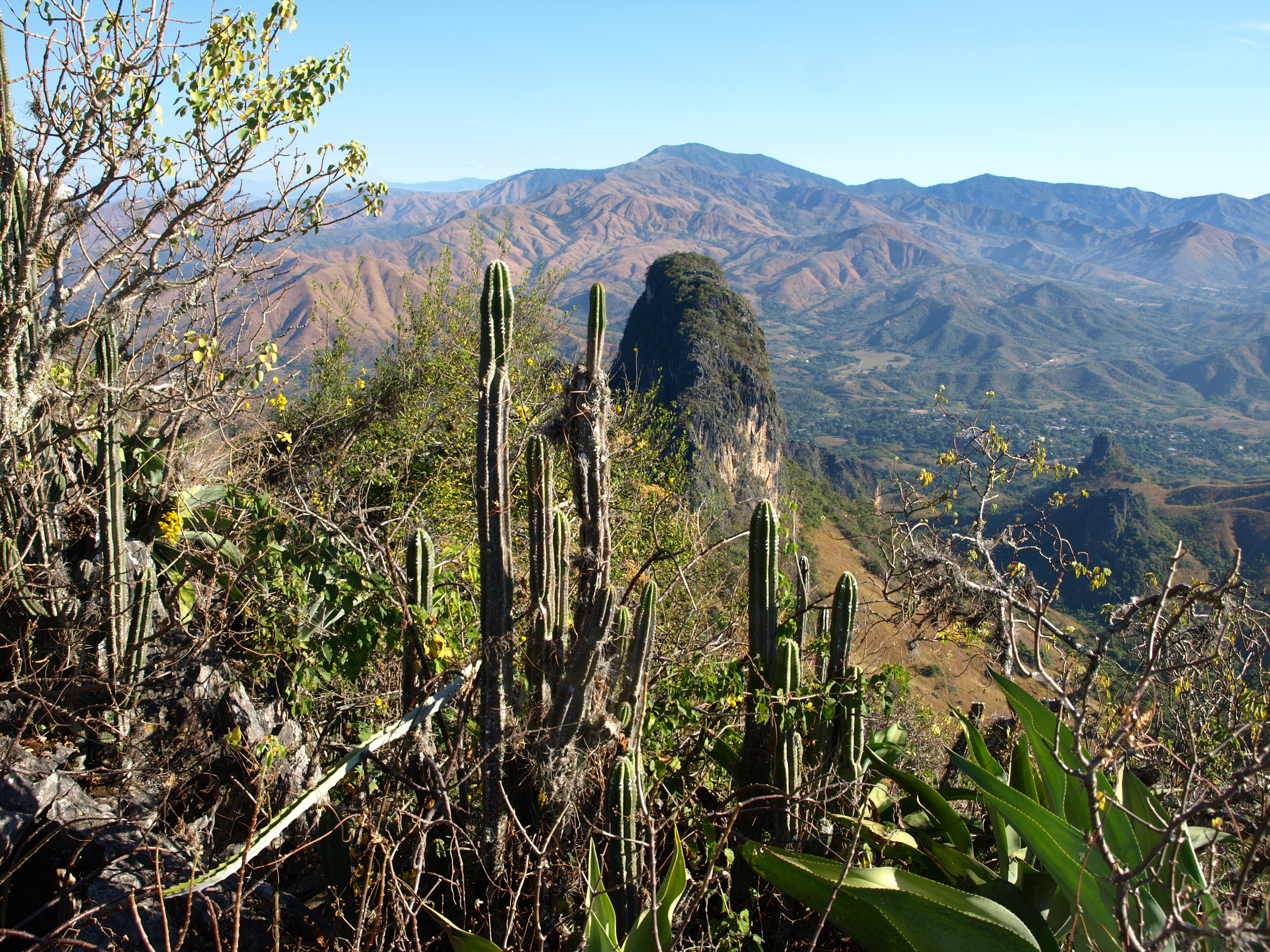

San Juan de los Morros has a completely specific geography where in mind-blowing mountains be triumphant with a completely unique look that deliver upward push to the call of the metropolis, Los Morros. In addition to those geographical formations, San Juan has a notable type of warm springs which helped the improvement of the metropolis because the cease of the ultimate century and for which, further to the hills, they've additionally made it well-known withinside the country. This is primarily based totally on 1901, withinside the Historical Site of La Puerta, with a warfare, Gómez triumphs over Luciano Mendoza. That warfare made him notable, and he commenced to turn out to be familiar with the town, decreeing in 1913 the reconstruction of the street from La Villa to San Juan, ordering the development of the spa in 1916, starting the Thermal Hotel in 1920 and his visits increasing. In 1924, he introduced Father Borges to offer the speech on the inauguration of the Arch of La Puerta, recalling his glory, now no longer that of the Liberator. And he employed in 1929 and had it lit on July 24, on his birthday, now no longer the opposite's, a twenty-four-meter lighthouse, positioned on the best hill, which gave mild to the plain. Bring electricity, telephone, resorts and public transportation. Pianolas, orthophonic and victrolas sound. There is a gallant and stately world. Packard and Lincoln emblem automobiles turn out to be bucolic. He remains withinside the Yellow House, so one can later be the governor's house.

== Economy ==
The 4 means that aid the financial improvement of the state are represented by livestock, hydrographic resources, agriculture and oil exploitation, though agriculture is the primary means of the state. Cattle, horses, pigs and goats make up for the manufacturing of milk and cheese. Oil, cement and herbal fuelling are responsible, as in other areas of the country, for the state's income. In the rural area, the planting of rice, watermelons, tobacco, cotton, cassava, beans, corn and tomato stands out.

== Culture ==
Those who visit Guárico State will be able to taste a wide variety of dishes and desserts typical to this region, with mixtures that go from the simplest, to the most elaborate and that honor the feel of the Llanero. The symbolic dish par excellence is the "Pisillo Guariqueño", a fried food seasoned with garlic and bell pepper in which the strands of salting and sun-dried deer (as well as cattle) meat are curled, fish or capybara.

The traditional "sancocho de gallina" (chicken stew) is also frequently prepared in this region. The basic ingredient is Chicken, cooked with plenty of green dressings and vegetables. Another well-known dish throughout the national territory, but which in San Juan presents a variation is "tripe", since in addition to vegetables and beef, lemon, cattle legs and belly are added. Another dish not very well known, but highly recommended and sought after, is fried pomfret, where the meat of this exquisite fish is used, seasoned with garlic, salt and lemon; and then fried, wrapped in flour.

Morrocoy (a type of turtle) cake is also a very famous, and highly prized dish throughout the region, whose preparation is based on morrocoy meat, dressings, raisins, eggs, potatoes, wine and spices. A variant of this recipe - considered a delicacy - is turtle cake, which has the same ingredients, except for the meat. In some parts of the country, this culinary tradition has been declining because of ecological reasons, in order to preserve the species.

However, there are still many places where you can taste it. As for drinks, it is common to find kiosks and food stalls in San Juan where you can taste corn carato, a soft drink made with corn dough, which is cooked with pineapple juice and papelon and left to rest until the next day. . The chicha criolla (creole chicha), seasoned with guayabita pepper, orange blossom water, lemon or orange hearts and almond essence, is another refreshing option.

You cannot forget the "panela guarapo", made with brown paper dissolved in water with lemon and ice, a special mixture to appease the heat of the city. The choice of desserts is headed by the traditional "dulce de leche", made with this fruit, cut into slices and cooked in a molasses of water with paper and fig leaves. Rice pudding is also very tempting.

In the lowland region (Los Llanos), it's not unusual to enjoy occasions with cultural and non-secular reasons, wherein Guariqueños are trying to find to exalt their ideals and their famous sentiment at distinct instances of the year. Most of them, along with the "joropo" dance, the tailed bulls and the Velorio de los Angeles Cruz, are practiced all through the countrywide territory, with sure changes relying at the region. Some of those fairs are as follows:

- Los Velorios de Cruz
- Toros coleados
- El Pájaro Guarandol
- La Burriquita
- El Chiriguare
- Baile del Joropo

== Geography ==
=== Climate ===
San Juan de Los Morros has a tropical savanna climate (Köppen Aw) bordering upon a tropical monsoon climate (Am). Its wet season is oppressive and overcast, whilst the dry season is humid and mostly cloudy, and it is hot year round. During the course of the year, the temperature generally ranges from 18 to 35 °C (64 to 95 °F), rarely going below 16 °C (61 °F) or rising above 38 °C (100 °F).

Based on the beach/pool score, the best time of year to visit San Juan de Los Morros for hot-weather activities is from late May to late March.

Climate data for San Juan de los Morros (1991–2020)
| Month | Jan | Feb | Mar | Apr | May | Jun | Jul | Aug | Sep | Oct | Nov | Dec | Year |
|---|---|---|---|---|---|---|---|---|---|---|---|---|---|
| Record high °C (°F) | 35.8 (96.4) | 37.0 (98.6) | 38.0 (100.4) | 37.5 (99.5) | 38.8 (101.8) | 38.6 (101.5) | 34.1 (93.4) | 34.2 (93.6) | 39.3 (102.7) | 35.2 (95.4) | 33.8 (92.8) | 34.6 (94.3) | 39.3 (102.7) |
| Mean daily maximum °C (°F) | 32.2 (90.0) | 33.0 (91.4) | 33.8 (92.8) | 33.6 (92.5) | 32.7 (90.9) | 31.6 (88.9) | 30.9 (87.6) | 30.9 (87.6) | 31.5 (88.7) | 31.5 (88.7) | 31.7 (89.1) | 31.9 (89.4) | 32.1 (89.8) |
| Daily mean °C (°F) | 23.9 (75.0) | 24.8 (76.6) | 26.0 (78.8) | 26.8 (80.2) | 26.5 (79.7) | 25.5 (77.9) | 24.8 (76.6) | 24.8 (76.6) | 25.1 (77.2) | 25.2 (77.4) | 24.9 (76.8) | 24.3 (75.7) | 25.2 (77.4) |
| Mean daily minimum °C (°F) | 17.2 (63.0) | 17.9 (64.2) | 19.4 (66.9) | 21.4 (70.5) | 22.3 (72.1) | 21.6 (70.9) | 21.0 (69.8) | 21.1 (70.0) | 21.2 (70.2) | 21.1 (70.0) | 20.5 (68.9) | 18.6 (65.5) | 20.3 (68.5) |
| Record low °C (°F) | 10.3 (50.5) | 6.8 (44.2) | 12.6 (54.7) | 15.6 (60.1) | 16.4 (61.5) | 15.6 (60.1) | 17.1 (62.8) | 16.4 (61.5) | 15.8 (60.4) | 15.4 (59.7) | 14.1 (57.4) | 11.8 (53.2) | 6.8 (44.2) |
| Average rainfall mm (inches) | 54.4 (2.14) | 31.1 (1.22) | 27.1 (1.07) | 86.5 (3.41) | 141.4 (5.57) | 193.2 (7.61) | 230.7 (9.08) | 245.4 (9.66) | 202.1 (7.96) | 208.1 (8.19) | 154.1 (6.07) | 107.0 (4.21) | 1,681.1 (66.19) |
| Average rainy days (≥ 1.0 mm) | 2.1 | 1.2 | 1.6 | 5.0 | 9.0 | 13.0 | 15.4 | 15.4 | 11.8 | 12.1 | 8.7 | 4.7 | 100.0 |
Source: NOAA

==== Clouds ====
In San Juan de Los Morros, the average percentage of the sky covered with clouds varies significantly over the course of the year.

The clearest part of the year in San Juan de Los Morros begins around December 12; It lasts 3.3 months and ends around March 21.

The clearest month of the year in San Juan de Los Morros is January, during which time the sky is clear, mostly clear, or partly cloudy, on average 37% of the time.

The cloudiest part of the year begins around March 21; it lasts 8.7 months and ends around December 12.

The cloudiest month of the year in San Juan de Los Morros is May, during which the sky is overcast or mostly cloudy, on average, 80% of the time.

==== Rain ====
To display version over a month and now no longer simply month-to-month totals, we display cumulative rainfall over a 31-day duration on a sliding scale targeted round every day of the 12 months. San Juan de Los Morros experiences great seasonal version in month-to-month rainfall. The wet season lasts for 9.2 months, from March 20 to December 26, with a rolling 31-day span of rain of as a minimum 0. five inches. The month with the maximum rain in San Juan de Los Morros is August, with a mean of a hundred and forty millimeters of rain. The rainless duration of the 12 months lasts for 2. eight months, from December 26 to March 20. The month with the least rain in San Juan de Los Morros is February, with a mean of four millimeters of rain.

==== Humidity ====
Lower dew points feel drier and higher dew points feel more humid. Unlike the temperature, which generally varies considerably between night and day, the dew point tends to change more slowly, so even if the temperature drops at night, on a humid day the night is usually humid.

In San Juan de Los Morros the perceived humidity varies extremely.

The muggier period of the year lasts for 9.2 months, from March 25 to December 31, during which time the comfort level is muggy, oppressive, or miserable at least 49% of the time. The month with the muggiest days in San Juan de Los Morros is October, with 29.4 muggy days or worse.

The month with the fewest muggy days in San Juan de Los Morros is February, with 9.7 muggy days or worse.

== Transport ==
San Juan de los Morros has several public lines of buses, vehicles, besides the new addition of Bus Guárico. Each of these has different prices, which vary over time. Motorcycles, commonly known as motortaxies (mototaxis), are the latest means of transportation and are steadily growing in popularity; on the other hand, bicycles are becoming less common nowadays.

=== Guarico Bus ===
| Route N.º | Destinations |
| 100 | Terminal - Villa Olímpica - Centro |
| 101 | Lucianero - Zona industrial - Plaza Bolívar - Centro |
| 102 | Las Minas-Centro |
| 103 | Urbanismo Hugo Chávez - Centro - Villa Olímpica |
| 104 | Urbanismo Hugo Chávez - Villa Olímpica - Centro |
| 200 | Urb. Guafal-Centro-Hospital |
| 201 | Urb. Guafal directo |
| 202 | San Sebastián - San Juan de los Morros |
| 203 | Pueblo Nuevo - Urb. Guafal-Centro |
| 300 | Vía Universidad - Av. Miranda Nueva-Centro - Terminal |
| 301 | Urb. Bella Vista - Plaza Bolívar - Centro |
| 302 | Vista Hermosa - Centro |
| 303 | Universidad (La Ceiba) - Zamora -Centro |
| 304 | Terminal - Agronomía - Unerg directo |
| 305 | Las Mercedes - Centro |
| 400 | Los Flores - Hospital - Centro |
| 500 | Urb. Rómulo Gallegos - Centro - Villa Olímpica |
| 600 | La Morera - Centro - Hospital |
| 601 | Pariapan - Hospital - Centro |
| 602 | Valle Verde - Centro |
| 900 | Cantagallo - San Juan de los Morros |
| 901 | Parapara - San Juan de los Morros |
| 902 | Ortiz - San Juan de los Morros |
| 903 | El Sombrero, (Municipio Julián Mellado) - San Juan de los Morros |

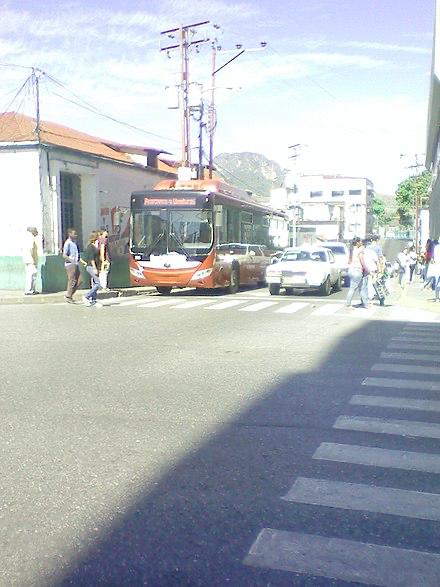
Bus Guarico

=== San Juan de los Morros Passenger Terminal ===
Located to the north of the city, on the San Juan-Villa de Cura national highway, from where daily routes leave for: Caracas - Barquisimeto - Maracay - Cua - Zaraza - Calabozo - San Fernando de Apure - Valle de la Pascua - Altagracia de Orituco - San Sebastián de Los Reyes - Barbacoas - San Casimiro - Ocumare de la Costa - Valencia - La Victoria - Cagua - Villa de Cura, among other destinations.

=== Main Avenues and Streets ===
Main and prominent avenues and streets:

- Avenue Los Llanos (1,9 km)
- Avenue Bolívar (3,7 km)
- Avenue Miranda (San Juan de los Morros) (2,5 km)
- Avenue Sendrea (1,6 km)
- Avenue Rómulo Gallegos (San Juan de los Morros) (1,2 km)
- Avenue Simón Bolívar (2,1 km)
- Avenue Cedeño (1,3 km)
- Avenue Acosta Carles (3,8 km)
- Avenue Fermín Toro (2,5 km)
- Avenue Fuerzas Armadas (1,4 km)
- Avenue Universidad Dr. Federico Brito Figueroa (2,3 km)
- Avenue José Félix Ribas (1,8 km)
- Avenue Los Puentes (400 meters)
- Avenue Santa Isabel (300 meters)
- Avenue Luis Aparicio (600 meters)
- Avenue Villa Olímpica (850 meters)
- Avenue Hugo Chávez (650 meters)
- Avenue Las Industrias (1,5 km)
- Avenue Principal de la Morera (1,1 km)
- Avenue Principal de la Rómulo Gallegos (1,2 km)
- Avenue Principal de Pueblo Nuevo (550 meters)
- Street Roscio (1,4 km)
- Street Mellado (1,0 km)
- Street Infante (1,2 km)
- Street Páez (950 meters)
- Street Rivas (700 meters)
- Street Mariño (600 meters)
- Street Salias (850 meters)
- Street Sucre (700 meters)
- Street Zaraza (350 meters)
- Street Zamora (1,3 km)
- Street Lazo Marti (400 meters)
- Street Bermúdez (350 meters)
- Street Guaiquera (550 meters)
- Street Santa Rosa (1,2 km)
- Street Miranda (350 meters)
- Street Las Mercedes (500 meters)
- Street Lasso Marti (800 metros)
- Street José Gregorio Hernández (750 meters)
- Street Araguaney (290 meters)
- Street El Carmen (550 meters)
- Street Urdaneta (290 meters)
- Street San Juan (350 meters)
- Street Carabobo (300 meters)
- Street Farriar (900 meters)
- Street Ambrosio Plaza (1,4 km)
- Street Piar (350 meters)

== Media ==
The city is home to local television channel TV Llano, and to three printed newspapers: El Nacionalista, La Antena, and La Prensa del Llano.

== See also ==
- Railway stations in Venezuela
