= Guárico =

State in Venezuela

Guárico State Estado Guárico
- State
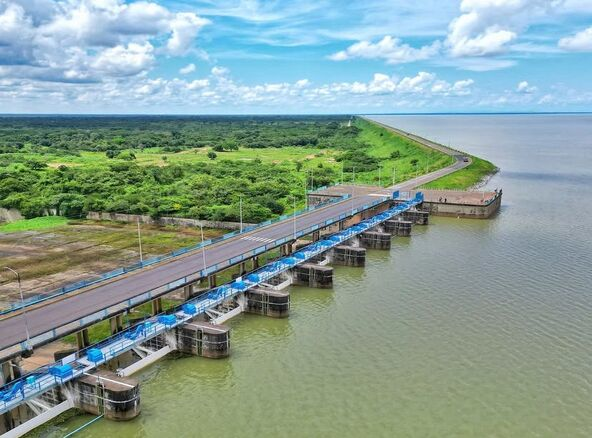
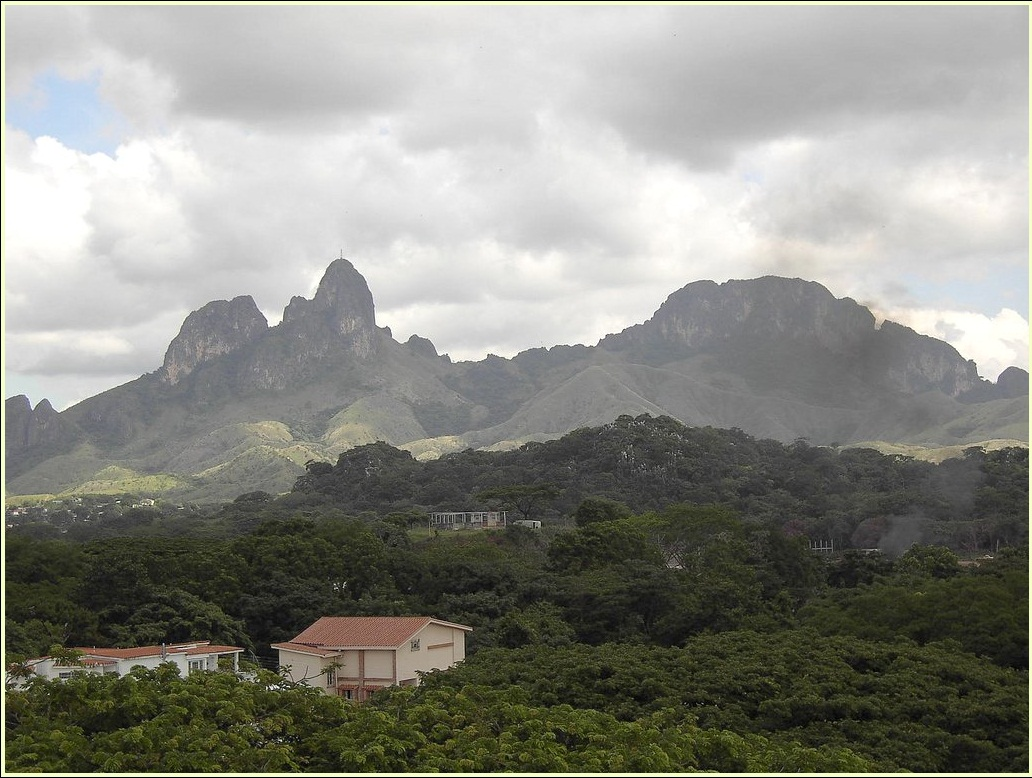
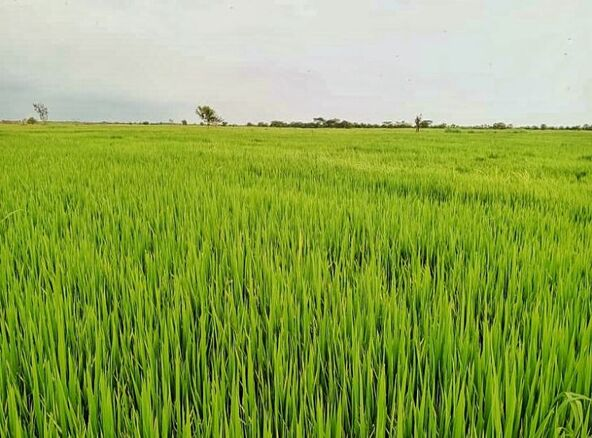
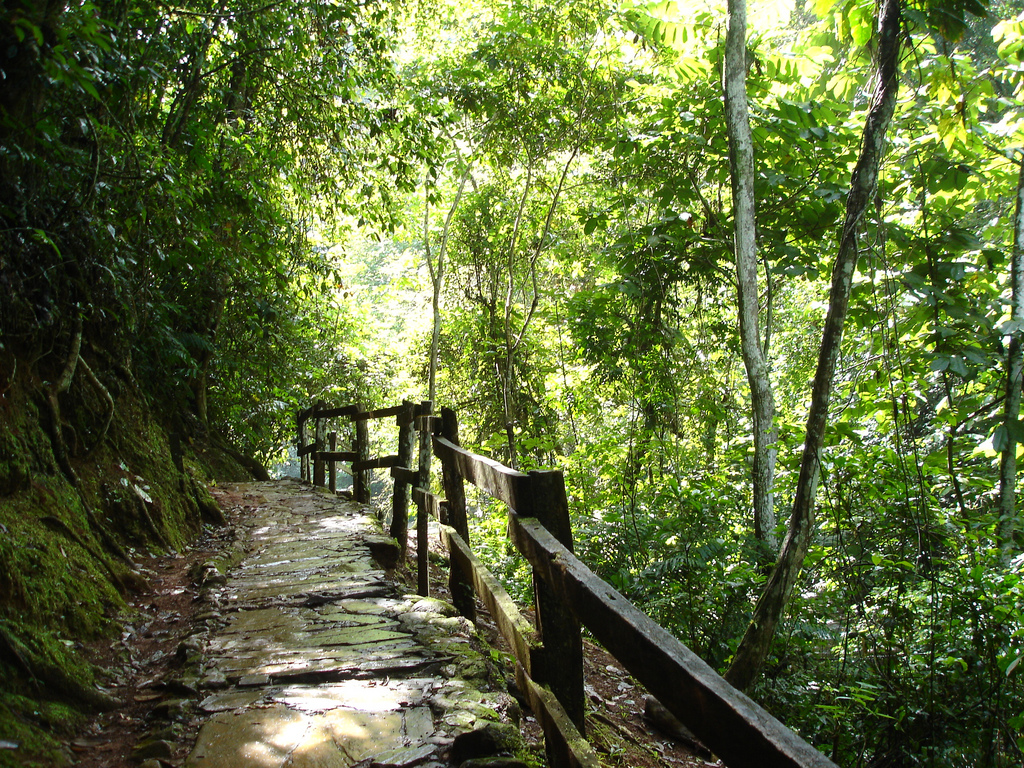
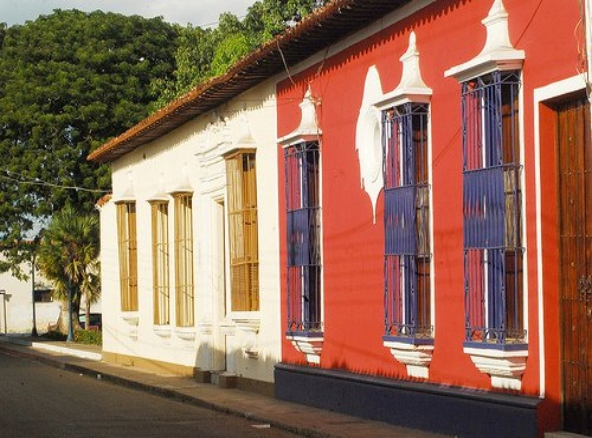
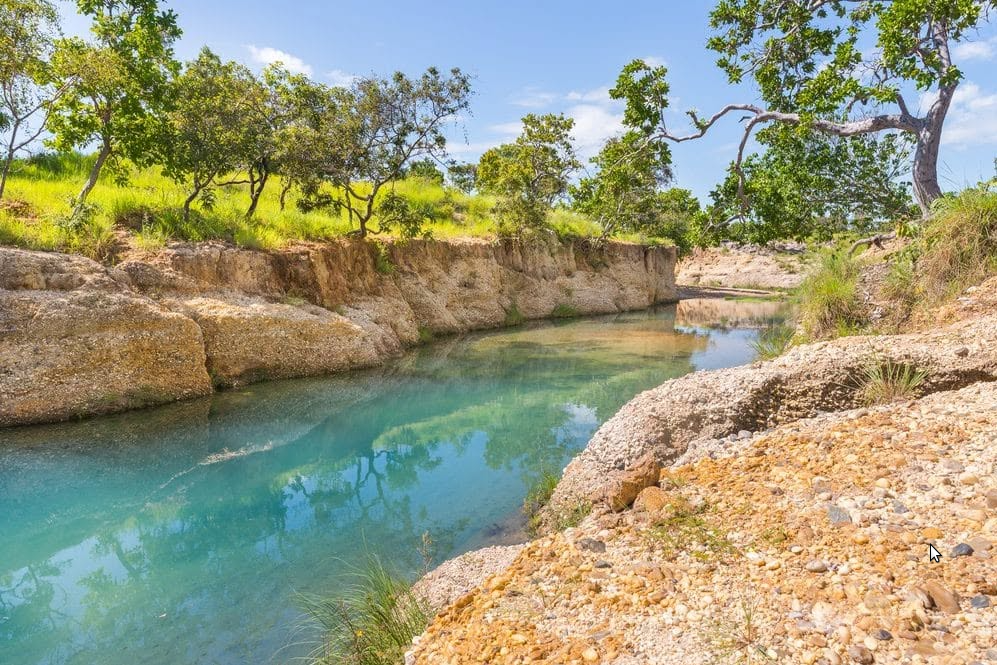
- From top left to bottom right: Generoso Campilongo Dam; Morros de San Juan; Rice fields; Guatopo National Park; Colonial center of Calabozo; Aguaro-Guariquito National Park

- Flag Coat of arms
- Nickname: El Corazón de Venezuela (The Heart of Venezuela)
- Motto(s): Si amas la libertad, ven a mis pampas (English: If you love liberty, come to my plains)
- Anthem: Himno del Estado Guárico
- Location within Venezuela
- Coordinates: 8.70°N 66.61°W
- Country: Venezuela
- Region: Los Llanos
- Created: 11 February 1848
- Named for: Guárico River
- Capital: San Juan de los Morros
- Largest city: Calabozo

Government
  - Body: Legislative Council
  - Governor: Donald Donaire (PSUV)

Area
  - Total: 66,400 km^{2} (25,600 sq mi)
  - Rank: 4th
- 7.1% of Venezuela

Population (2023)
  - Total: 855,381
  - Rank: 16th
  - Density: 11.46/km^{2} (29.7/sq mi)
- 2.85% of Venezuela
- Demonym: Guariqueño/a
- Time zone: UTC−4 (VET)
- ISO 3166 code: VE-J
- Emblematic tree: Palma llanera (Copernicia tectorum)
- HDI (2019): 0.673 medium · 21st of 24
- Website: www.guarico.gob.ve

Guárico State (Spanish: Estado Guárico, IPA: [esˈtaðo ˈɣwaɾiko]) is one of the 23 states of Venezuela. Located in the central region of the country, in the Los Llanos region, it is bordered to the north by Carabobo, Aragua, and Miranda; to the east by Anzoátegui; to the south by Bolívar and Apure; and to the west by Barinas and Cojedes. The state capital is San Juan de los Morros, and its largest city is Calabozo, the former capital of the state. Other important cities include Valle de la Pascua, Zaraza, and Altagracia de Orituco. The state covers a total surface area of 66,400 km^{2} (25,600 sq mi), making it the fourth largest state in Venezuela, and had an estimated population of 855,381 in 2023.

Guárico is known as "the gateway" to the Central Plains (Los Llanos Centrales), with a geography of contrasts between mountainous areas near the border with Cojedes, the characteristic "morros" (rocky formations) that accompany the course of the Guárico River, and extensive flat plains. The state's economy is based primarily on agriculture, livestock, and agro-industry, with significant production of rice, corn, and sorghum. The state also possesses vast oil reserves, concentrated in the south within the Orinoco Oil Belt. The Guárico River, which gives the state its name, flows through the region and is dammed at the Generoso Campilongo Dam, one of Venezuela's largest irrigation reservoirs.

The state's history is closely linked to the expansion of colonial settlements during the 17th and 18th centuries, the struggle for independence from Spain, and the civil wars that marked 19th-century Venezuela. Guárico was officially created as a province in 1848 and became a state in 1864. Its cultural heritage includes Llanero traditions, music such as the joropo, and a rich culinary tradition featuring dishes like "Pisillo Guariqueño." The state is also home to several national parks and natural monuments, including Aguaro-Guariquito National Park, Guatopo National Park, and the Morros de San Juan Natural Monument.

== History ==
=== Conquest and colony ===
When the Europeans arrived in Venezuela, various ethnic groups inhabited the region that would constitute Guárico. Among these were the Caribs Tamanacos, Palenques, and Cumanagotos, as well as groups of Guamos and Otomacos. The latter were in permanent confrontation with the Caribs.

The colonization of the region only began in the 17th century and above all in the 18th century. The cacique Chiparara managed to organize Carib and Otomac groups in the Llanos de Guárico to counter-attack the Spanish colonizing forces. After they were defeated, around 1653, the Carib and Otomac groups would retreat southward or lose cohesion and would be gradually assimilated.

Many of the settlers who settled in the area were Basque missionaries and encomenderos who founded Altagracia de Orituco on March 1, 1676. Miguel de Urbés, a lieutenant of Joan Orpí, founded the city of Zaraza in 1645 with the name of San Miguel de la Nueva Tarragona del Batey. El Sombrero was founded in 1720. Four years later they founded Calabozo. In 1728 they established the town of Chaguaramas in a place where there were settlements of cumanagotos. Fray Anselmo Isidro de Ardales established the town of Tucupido in 1760 with groups of cumanagotes and palenques. San Juan de los Morros would be founded much later, around 1780.

Alexander von Humboldt and Aimé Bonpland passed through the region in March 1800 on their way to the Orinoco and its tributaries.

During the time of Spanish rule, Guárico was part of the Province of Caracas, which belonged to the Captaincy General of Venezuela.

=== 19th century ===
During the war of independence, several battles took place in the region of Guárico.

The military chief José Tomás Boves defeated Vicente Campo Elías in La Puerta, near San Juan de los Morros, on February 3, 1814. A few months later, in June, the Spanish troops again under the command of Boves defeated the troops of Simón Bolívar and Santiago Mariño on the same battlefield.

On August 2, 1816, the battle of Quebrada Honda near El Socorro took place. The royalists were defeated by the Republican army led by the Scottish adventurer Gregor MacGregor.

The Plains troops led by José Antonio Páez defeated the Royalist forces of Marshal Pablo Morillo on February 12, 1818, in the Battle of Calabozo. However, Morillo was able to defeat the troops of General Simón Bolívar in the third battle of La Puerta.

After independence, Guárico became the scene of numerous battles in the civil wars that plagued the country in the 19th century.

Venezuela entered into a deep crisis from 1842 onward. In 1846 an uprising took place that was particularly felt in Guárico. Peasants and other poor people complained about social injustice and numerous groups criticized the political situation in which only a few elites held all the power. The protests continued until May 1847.

The creation with the name of Guárico Province dates from 1848 when the province of Caracas was divided into three.

In 1856 Guárico became part of the 21 provinces of Venezuela until 1864 when it was declared an independent state and an integral part of the United States of Venezuela.

On February 17, 1860, the Battle of Coplé between the federalist and central government troops took place near Calabozo. The battle itself did not give clear results, but the continuation of the guerrilla warfare after this episode led to the signing of a peace agreement on April 23, 1863, between the Federalists and the Government.

In 1879 the state became part of the Gran Estado Miranda with what is now Bolívar (present-day Miranda), Guzmán Blanco (present-day Aragua), Apure, and Nueva Esparta. In 1889 this state was renamed Miranda.

On March 11, 1892, the caudillo Joaquín Crespo rose up against the president of that time, Raimundo Andueza Palacio, who had wanted to change the constitution at the beginning of 1892 in order to supposedly govern for two more years. Joaquín Crespo marched from his hacienda in Guárico to Caracas, where he took power.

In 1898, Guárico acquired its autonomy again and in 1899 it was ratified by presidential decree. From this date on, it remained an independent state even though it suffered changes in its territory. Its boundaries with the state of Aragua were established by a protocol signed in 1933.

General Juan Vicente Gómez defeated near San Juan de los Morros the troops of General Luciano Mendoza, who was fighting on the side of the so-called Liberating Revolution against Cipriano Castro.

=== 20th century ===
Foreign companies began to exploit oil in the Guárico area in 1946. The fields of El Carrizal and El Sombrero began to attract many workers.

In 1957, the construction of the Guárico River reservoir, the Embalse Ing. Generoso Campilongo, began. With 230 km², it is one of the largest irrigation reservoirs in Venezuela and has been contributing to the development of the country.

=== 21st century ===
In 2018, the state experienced a series of lootings that affected several businesses in Calabozo and other cities, in the context of the economic and social crisis that has affected Venezuela since 2013.

In 2021, Donald Donaire was elected governor of the state. In 2025, Janny Álvarez Mirabal was elected mayor of the Francisco de Miranda Municipality, which includes Calabozo.

== Geography ==
=== Location ===
Guárico is known as "the gateway" to the Central Plains, with a geography of contrasts between mountainous areas near the border of the state of Cojedes, "galeras" (because of their hat shape), or "morros" that accompany the course of the Guárico River and an equally wide area of flat land.

Guárico State is bounded on the north by Miranda, Aragua, and Carabobo states; on the south by Bolívar and Apure; on the east by Anzoátegui state; and on the west by Cojedes and Barinas states.

=== Relief ===
Most of it is flat and occupies the Central Plains of the country. To the northwest, it has low mountains, also known as Morros, and hills of the Cordillera de la Costa.

The mountainous part of Guárico includes the Fila de los Suspiros, bordering the state of Cojedes to the northwest, continues with the Fila de La Raya, also called La Escalera, until reaching the city of San Juan de los Morros, some of which can reach 2000 meters above sea level. Other mountains to the east of the state include Cerro de las Minas, the Serranía de Guatopo strip on the sides of the Orituco River Valleys.

=== Climate ===
The average annual temperature is 26 °C. The climate is predominantly tropical savanna, characterized by a marked dry season and a rainy period.

=== Hydrography ===
The state of Guárico is crossed by several rivers, streams, and morichales that remain even during the dry months. The rivers of the Unare Basin from Valle de la Pascua head towards the Caribbean Sea and include the main rivers: Unare, Quebrada Honda, Morichito, Ipire, and Agua Amarilla. The rest of the state has rivers that are tributaries of the Orinoco River, including the Apure River in its lower basin, Chirgua, Espino, Guárico, Macaira, Manapire, Memo, Tamanaco, Tiznados, Tucupido, Orituco, and Zuata.

== Municipalities and municipal seats ==
Guárico State is divided into 15 municipalities and 39 parishes:

1. Camaguán (Camaguán)
2. Chaguaramas (Chaguaramas)
3. El Socorro (El Socorro)
4. Francisco de Miranda (Calabozo)
5. José Félix Ribas (Tucupido)
6. José Tadeo Monagas (Altagracia de Orituco)
7. Juan Germán Roscio (San Juan de los Morros)
8. Julián Mellado (El Sombrero)
9. Las Mercedes (Las Mercedes del Llano)
10. Leonardo Infante (Valle de la Pascua)
11. Ortiz (Ortiz)
12. Pedro Zaraza (Zaraza)
13. San Gerónimo de Guayabal (Guayabal)
14. San José de Guaribe (San José de Guaribe)
15. Santa María de Ipire (Santa María de Ipire)

== Demographics ==
=== Historical population ===
Historical population
Year	Pop.	±% p.a.
1873	173,748	—
1881	186,675	+0.90%
1891	174,929	−0.65%
1920	120,841	−1.27%
1926	124,939	+0.56%
1936	120,420	−0.37%
1941	135,089	+2.33%
1950	164,523	+2.21%
1961	244,966	+3.69%
1971	318,905	+2.67%
1981	393,467	+2.12%
1990	488,623	+2.44%
2001	627,086	+2.29%
2011	747,739	+1.78%

=== Main cities ===
Cities of Guárico
N	City	Population			Municipality
N	City	Census 1981	Census 1990	Census 2011	Municipality
1	Calabozo	71,871	99,574	131,989	Francisco de Miranda
2	San Juan de los Morros	68,457	85,434	120,111	Juan Germán Roscio
3	Valle de la Pascua	64,464	75,746	115,902	Leonardo Infante
4	Zaraza	31,467	42,464	78,642	Pedro Zaraza
5	Altagracia de Orituco	25,876	34,434	52,952	José Tadeo Monagas

=== Race and ethnicity ===
According to the 2011 Census, the racial composition of the population was:

Racial composition	Population	%
Mestizo	451,650	60.4
White	245,274	32.8
Black	43,368	5.8
Other race	7,447	1.0

== Economy ==
Agriculture is the main economic activity in this state. Guárico also occupies a significant place in the cultivation of cereals such as rice, corn, and sorghum. This activity is linked to the agro-industrial sector, both supported by the existence of 16 reservoirs and three irrigation systems (Guárico, Orituco, and Tiznados rivers).

With respect to livestock, the production of cattle and pigs stands out. As of 2023, Guárico is the fourth largest producer of cattle in Venezuela. Within the timber activity, the production of wood in logs is ranked seventh in the national total.

=== Petroleum ===
The state of Guárico also has vast oil reserves concentrated mainly in the south in the so-called Orinoco Oil Belt. In the Boyacá Field located in the south-central part of Guárico State, there are 8 oil blocks with reserves estimated at 489 billion barrels. In the Junín Field, located in the southeast of Guárico State and the southwest of Anzoátegui State, there are 10 blocks with reserves estimated at 557,000 million barrels.

=== Forest resources ===
The state's forests include species such as: Aceituno, araguaney (Handroanthus chrysanthus), ceiba, cherry, drago, jobo, puy, and saqui-saqui, among others.

=== Mineral resources ===
The state has deposits of silica sands, barite, gravel, vanadium, gypsum, zinc, and gravel.

== Tourism ==
=== San Juan de los Morros Thermal Waters ===
These are sulphurous, alkaline, borate waters, with a blue color and an average temperature of 33.5 °C. It is a thermo-mineral spring with a capacity of 6,800 L/h. They are surrounded by a dry tropical forest, with very arid vegetation. It has bathrooms, pools, and various services. They are located northwest of San Juan de los Morros, 58 km from Maracay.

=== Thermal Waters of Guarumen ===
These are waters that flow from galleys, forming four wells or springs. It has pools and bathing rooms. They are located between the towns of Ortiz and San Francisco de Cara, 60 km from San Juan de los Morros.

=== Aguaro-Guariquito National Park ===
It was created on March 7, 1974. It covers an area of 569,000 ha, making it the fifth largest national park in Venezuela. Its area is covered by savannahs and forests, rivers, lagoons, and a rich flora of great color and beauty and a varied fauna. It is located in the south of Guárico State, between the municipalities of Sebastián Francisco de Miranda and Las Mercedes.

=== Guatopo National Park ===
It was created on March 31, 1958. It comprises the mountainous region of the Interior Range, between Santa Teresa del Tuy and Altagracia de Orituco. It has an extension of 92,640 ha. The vegetation is tropical rainforest and semi-wet formations. The fauna is wild and very rich in mammals.

It has three important recreational facilities: Agua Blanca, Santa Crucecita, and Quebrada de Guatopo. Excursions and long walks can be made in them. It is located between the districts of Independencia, Lander, and Acevedo in the state of Miranda and the district of Monagas in the state of Guárico.

=== Guanapito Reservoir ===
Main source of water supply and treatment for the Orituco region, especially for the valleys, and which is revealed in the area where the population of Guanape once existed. The dam is built with cement, stone, and sand; its gates are constantly monitored by a control point, which is manually backed up if it does not work.

=== Morros de Macaira Natural Monument ===
Morros de Macaira Natural Monument is a natural monument located in the State of Guárico. It was created in 1978. It covers an area of 99 hectares. Throughout the region, it is common to find limestone massifs, caves furrowed by small watercourses, and deep vertical peaks.

Morros de Macaira Natural Monument is located in the municipality of José Tadeo Monagas. The western boundary of the monument is determined by the road that connects Altagracia de Orituco with San Francisco de Macaira.

Its main attraction is the limestone formation of great paleontological and environmental value. It is made up of three massifs, which house numerous caves crossed by river torrents. The vegetation is mainly composed of semi-deciduous forests and semi-deciduous shrubs in the mountainous forest region of the Venezuelan coastal range.

=== Arístides Rojas Natural Monument (Morros de San Juan) ===
It was created on November 11, 1949, and its area is 1,630 hectares. Its main attraction are the "morros," geological formations of peculiar shapes. They are populated by hill and forest savannas. It is located 5 km northwest of San Juan de los Morros.

=== Tierra Blanca Reservoir ===
Built in 1976, it supplies approximately 300 liters per second to San Juan de los Morros and is also a recreational park with activities planned and directed by groups based on government programs.

== Politics and government ==
It is an autonomous and equal state in political terms, organizing its administration and public powers through a Constitution of the Guárico State, dictated by the Legislative Council.

=== Executive Power ===
The Governor of the State of Guárico is the Chief Executive of that State. According to Article 160 of the Venezuelan Constitution of 1999, the governor must be: Venezuelan, over twenty-five years old, and from a secular state. The governor is elected for four years by simple majority and can be re-elected for additional periods. The governor appoints a group of trusted secretaries to assist him in the functions of the government who are freely appointed and removed. The governor is accountable for his actions to the Guárico State Legislative Council.

The current governor is Donald Donaire of the ruling PSUV party.

=== Legislative Power ===
The state legislature is the responsibility of the Legislative Council of Guárico, a unicameral parliament, elected by the people through a universal direct and secret vote every four years. It can be reelected for two consecutive periods, under a system of proportional representation of the population of the state and its municipalities.

== Education ==
=== Universities ===
- Universidad Nacional Experimental Rómulo Gallegos (UNERG)
- Universidad Nacional Abierta
- Universidad Nacional Experimental Politécnica de la Fuerza Armada Nacional
- Universidad Nacional Experimental Simón Rodríguez
- Universidad Pedagógica Experimental Libertador
- Universidad Bolivariana de Venezuela

== Culture ==
=== Tourist Carnival of the Venezuelan Eastern Plain ===
This festivity generally takes place in February in the city of Zaraza, being the main tourist attraction of the region. Characterized by the large iluminated, and colourful floats and groups, it attracs a large numbers of tourists. On the same date the "Agro-industrial Fairs of the Unare River Basin" are held in the city, placing Zaraza as one of the most important tourist destinations in the state.

=== Fairs of San Miguel Arcángel ===
Religious and socio-cultural festivities that take place from September 21 to October 4, in Altagracia de Orituco, where the most famous national groups attend.

=== Candlemas Fairs ===
Religious and socio-cultural festivities, which take place in the first week of February, motivated by the day of Our Lady of Candelaria on February 2. They take place in Valle de la Pascua. They are considered one of the most important fairs in the state, where there are also agricultural and livestock exhibitions, with national call and/or participation.

=== Cruz Wake ===
Religious and social festival held during the month of May, where the most famous reciters in the country sing "fulías" accompanied by music of cuatro, guitar, maracas, harp, and drum.

=== The Guarandol Bird ===
A comparsa formed by several people who dance and sing. The central characters are three: the guarandol bird, the sorcerer, and the hunter. The motive for this entertainment revolves around the hunting of the bird, the plea not to kill it, and the intervention of the sorcerer to resurrect it.

=== La Burriquita ===
It is a dance where the main character wears a costume that allows him to represent a donkey and rider at the same time. She dances to the beat of a joropo, does pirouettes, brays, and does all the things typical of the donkey and her rider.

When the Spaniards arrived in the Americas, they brought with them manifestations, expressions, and religious celebrations, and these joined those contributed by the aborigines and Afro-descendant culture, enriching the cultural legacy. La Burriquita is part of the transfer of cultures from Spain; it has influence in two manifestations: the dance of the heifers and the horses. It entered through Cubagua, the first settlement in Venezuelan territory due to its pearl wealth, and later with the system of missions and parcels penetrated the entire country. You can see La Burriquita dancing in the streets especially during Carnival, but also at Christmas in some places in the east and west of the country.

=== Joropo ===
The joropo is sung and danced all over Venezuela. It is not only a danceable expression, but also a party where corridos, galerones, golpes, passages, and other folkloric tonalities are sung and danced. It takes place at any time of the year and the motive can be a baptism, birthday, or the celebration of a patron saint's day. The music of the joropo is played with typical instruments such as cuatro, maracas, and harp, which accompany songs and choruses.

The zapateo and escobilleo, which are steps of the joropo, are mixed in the state with typical turns of the region like the remolino, the cuartao, and the toriao.

=== Gastronomy ===
The quintessential symbol dish is "Pisillo Guariqueño," a fried dish seasoned with garlic and sweet chili in which threads of salted and sun-dried venison, as well as cattle, fish, or capybara, are curled.

The traditional chicken stew is also often prepared in this region. The basic ingredient is chicken, cooked with plenty of green seasoning and vegetables. Another well-known dish throughout the country is mondongo, since in addition to vegetables and beef, lemon, cattle feet, and belly are added.

Another dish is the fried palometa, where the meat of this fish is used, seasoned with garlic, salt, and lemon; then it is fried wrapped in flour. It is also very famous the morrocoy cake, a very appreciated dish all over the country, whose elaboration is based on morrocoy meat, seasoning, raisins, eggs, potatoes, wine, and spices. The variant of this recipe—considered a delicacy—is the turtle cake, which has the same ingredients, except for the meat. In some parts of the country, this culinary tradition has been diminished for ecological reasons, in order to preserve the species. However, there are still many places where it can be tasted.

In the city of Calabozo, the hallaca and carato are traditional during the Christmas season. Also traditional are empanadas, arepas, orejitas with cheese, queso de mano, mango jelly, fig candy, papaya candy, rice pudding, chicha (rice and milk drink); in pastry, the bombón (a ball of wheat flour fried in oil and then filled with pastry cream and sugar on the outside), also quesadillas, baked, made of wheat flour, filled with grated Llanero cheese and sugar.

== See also ==
- States of Venezuela
- Administrative divisions of Venezuela
