= Nosliw Rodríguez =

Venezuelan politician

Member of the 2017 Constituent National Assembly of Venezuela
- Incumbent
- Assumed office 4 August 2017

Deputy of the National Assembly
- In office 5 January 2016 – 2 June 2017

Personal details
- Born: 26 October 1988 (age 37) San Carlos, Venezuela
- Party: United Socialist Party of Venezuela (PSUV)
- Parent: Trina Leonar Franco (br) José David Rodríguez Bolívar
- Relatives: Jesús David (brother); José David (brother)
- Education: University of Carabobo
- Profession: Civil engineer
- Committees: Permanent Commission of Science, Technology and Innovation

Nosliw Rodríguez Franco (26 October 1988) is a Venezuelan politician. Nosliw was deputy of the National Assembly for Cojedes. She is currently a member of the 2017 Constituent National Assembly.

== Career ==
She graduated in civil engineering in the University of Carabobo. She is a militant of the United Socialist Party of Venezuela (PSUV in Spanish), from the ranks of the Youth of the United Socialist Party of Venezuela (JPSUV), starting her tasks in the municipal political team of Lima Blanco, to later be promoted to the political state team in Cojedes. Being already inside of the PSUV, she assumes the leadership of the situational room in the Lima Blanco municipality, as well as the organization area of the Chávez party in the Cojedes state. She is currently the state secretary of the Youth of the United Socialist Party of Venezuela, coordinator of the bases of missions of her circuit and was coordinator of the Corporation of Intermediate Industries of Venezuela (CORPIVENSA).

During the 2015 parliamentary elections, Nosliw takes the nominal candidacy for the Great Patriotic Pole of the second circuit of Cojedes, formed by the municipalities of Tinaquillo, Lima Blanco, Tinaco, Girardot and Pao de San Juan Bautista, winning with 54% of the votes. She was a member of the parliamentary Permanent Commission of Science, Technology and Innovation. In 2016, she declared "we don’t have high levels of malnourishment" during an interview in Globovisión, stating "you even know it, only that you allow yourself to be filled with the national and international media trash". On 30 July 2017, she was elected as a member of the 2017 Constituent National Assembly.

Nosliw was identified as one of the people that led an attack against Juan Guaidó on 11 June 2022 in San Carlos, Cojedes state, where pro-government followers threw objects at him and violently removed him from the restaurant he was holding a meeting in.
