= List of railway stations in Venezuela =

Proposed railway network (Click on map to enlarge)

Railway stations in Venezuela include:

== Cities with Rapid Transit ==
City with underground railway system:

- Caracas (El Metro de Caracas, operated by C.A. Metro de Caracas)
- Los Teques Metro - opened in 2006.

== Stations ==
=== Closed ===
- Camoruco
- El Encanto

=== Existing ===
- Puerto Cabello
- San Felipe (Yaracuy state)
- Barquisimeto - terminus
- Caracas
- Cúa - opened 2006
- Ciudad Guayana port for mining railways

=== Under Construction ===
- San Juan de los Morros
- San Fernando de Apure
- Chaguaramas
- Cabruta

=== Proposed ===
- Tinaco
- El Pao
- Ortiz, Venezuela
- Chaguaramas
- Valle de la Pascua
- state of Anzoátegui, in north-east Venezuela.

==== Green ====
- El Piñal
- Barquisimeto
- Carora
- La Ceiba
- El Vigía
- La Fría a.k.a. La Fria
- Encontrados
- Machiques
- Maracaibo
- Puerto Las Américas - terminus

==== Purple ====
- Punto Fijo - terminus
- Coro
- Yaracal
- Tucacas
- Morón, Venezuela
- Puerto Cabello

==== Brown ====
- El Baul, Cojedes

== See also ==
- East-West Railway, Venezuela
- Instituto Autónomo de Ferrocarriles del Estado
- Transport in Venezuela
- Transcontinental railroad
