= Cojedes =

Cojedes may refer to:

- Cojedes (state), one of the 23 states of Venezuela
- Cojedes, Cojedes, a town in the Venezuelan state of Cojedes
- Cojedes River, a river in Venezuela
