= Tinaquillo =

- Nuestra Señora del Socorro de Tinaquillo
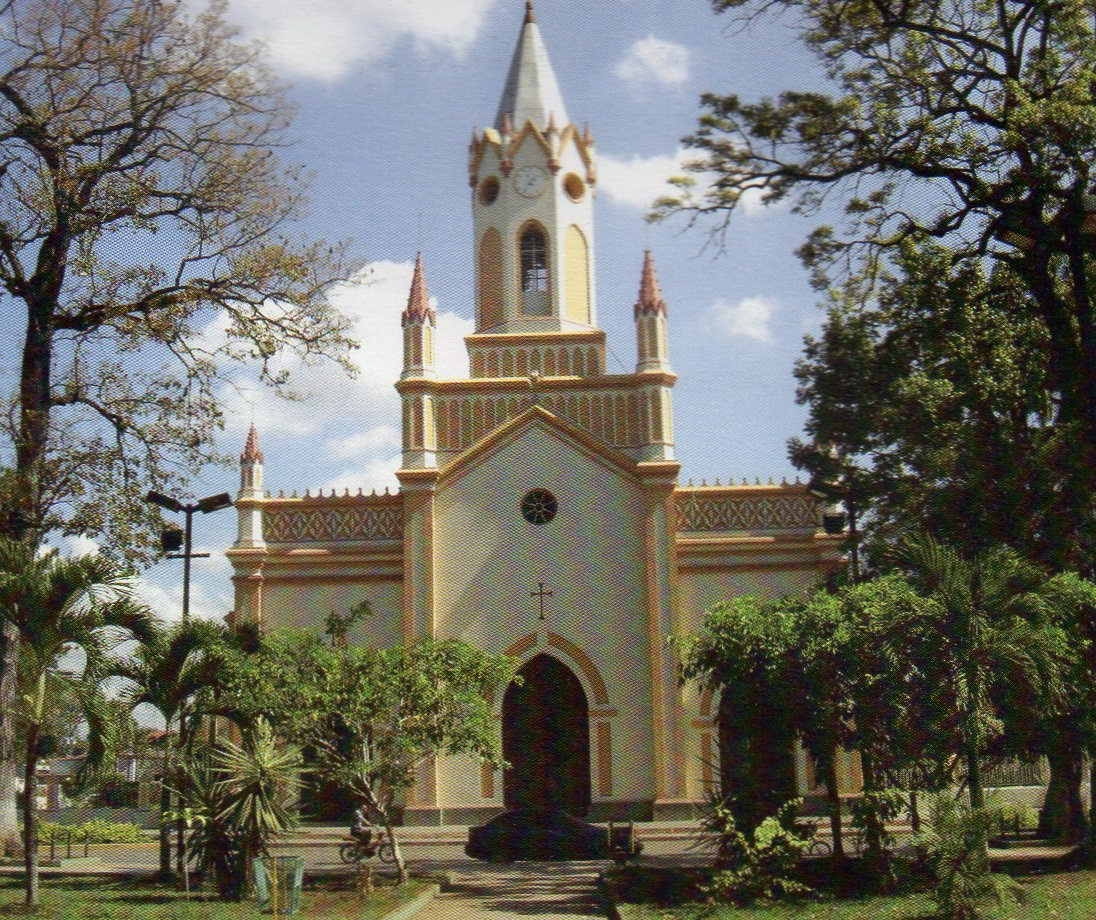
- Iglesia de Nuestra Señora del Socorro

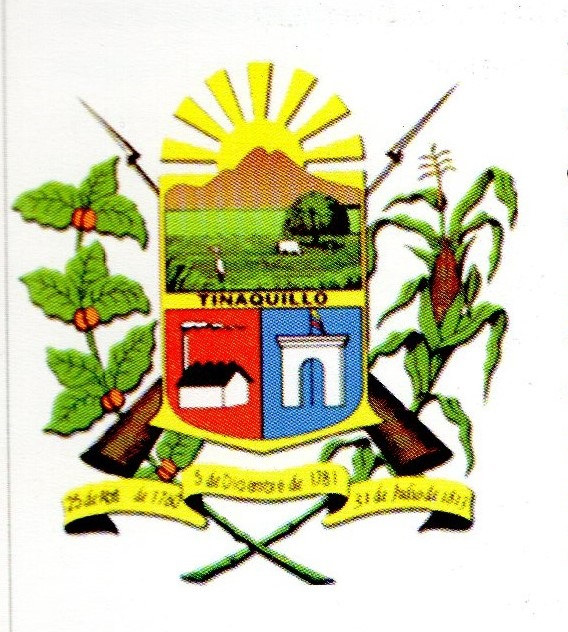
- Flag Coat of arms

- Location in Venezuela
- Coordinates: 9°55′N 68°18′W
- Country: Venezuela
- State: Cojedes
- Municipality: Tinaquillo
- Founded: 1781
- Elevation: 420 m (1,380 ft)

Population (2021)
  - Total: 124,919
- Time zone: UTC-4:30 (HLV)
- Climate: Aw

Tinaquillo is a city in Cojedes, Venezuela, 53 km from San Carlos. It is the seat of the Tinaquillo Municipality. It has a total population of 97,687 (2011).

== Economy ==
Agriculture and cattle breeding have traditionally been main sectors in the region's economy.

== Notable people ==
- Auri López (born 1999), model, imageologist and beauty pageant titleholder
- Cilia Flores (born 1956), the first lady of Venezuela from 2013 to 2026 and the wife of Nicolás Maduro

== See also ==
- List of cities and towns in Venezuela
