= Girardot Municipality =

Girardot Municipality may refer to:

- Girardot, Cundinamarca, Colombia
- Girardot Municipality, Aragua, Venezuela
- Girardot Municipality, Cojedes, Venezuela
