= Falcón Municipality =

Falcón Municipality may refer to the following municipalities in Venezuela:

- Falcón Municipality, Cojedes
- Falcón Municipality, Falcón
