= San Fernando Municipality, Apure =

Municipality in Apure, Venezuela

San Fernando Municipality Municipio San Fernando
- Municipality
- Flag Seal

- Location in Apure

- Location in Venezuela
- Country: Venezuela
- State: Apure
- Founded: 1777
- Municipal seat: San Fernando de Apure

Government
  - Mayor: Lisandro Solorzano (PSUV)

Area
  - Total: 5,603.9 km^{2} (2,163.7 sq mi)

Population (2024)
  - Total: 249,642
  - Density: 44.548/km^{2} (115.38/sq mi)
- Time zone: UTC−4 (VET)

San Fernando Municipality is located in Apure, Venezuela. It was founded in 1777. The municipality has a total surface of 5982 km^{2} and it has some 249,642 inhabitant (2024 census).
