= Tinaco Municipality =

Tinaco Municipality Municipio Tinaco
- Municipality
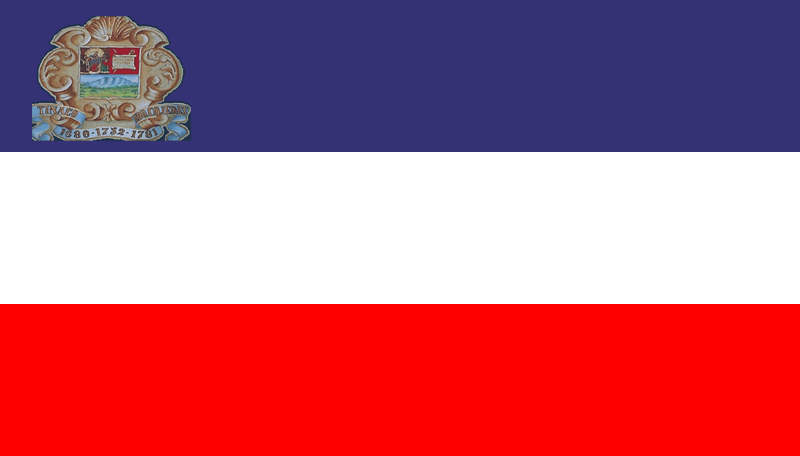
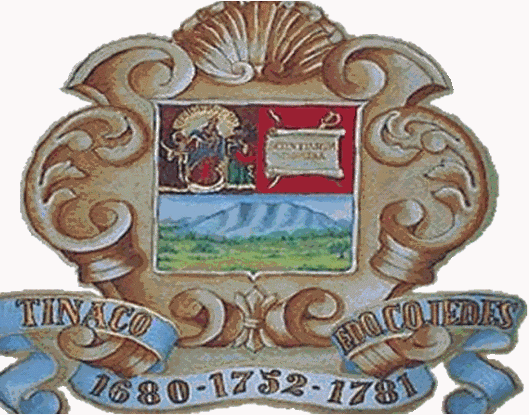
- Flag Coat of arms

- Location in Cojedes

- Location in Venezuela
- Coordinates: 9°30′01″N 68°20′47″W
- Country: Venezuela
- State: Cojedes
- Municipal seat: Tinaco

Government
  - Mayor: José Galíndez Guevara (VVC)

Area
  - Total: 872.5 km^{2} (336.9 sq mi)

Population (2011)
  - Total: 32,564
  - Density: 37.32/km^{2} (96.67/sq mi)
- Time zone: UTC−4 (VET)
- Area code(s): 0258
- Website: Official website

The Tinaco Municipality is one of the nine municipalities (municipios) that makes up the Venezuelan state of Cojedes and, according to the 2011 census by the National Institute of Statistics of Venezuela, the municipality has a population of 32,564. The town of Tinaco is the municipal seat of the Tinaco Municipality.

== Demographics ==
The Tinaco Municipality, according to a 2007 population estimate by the National Institute of Statistics of Venezuela, has a population of 31,371 (up from 27,203 in 2000). This amounts to 10.4% of the state's population. The municipality's population density is 28.57 inhabitants per square kilometre (74.0/sq mi).

== Government ==
The mayor of the Tinaco Municipality is Teodoro Venancio Bolívar Caballero, elected on October 31, 2004, with 65% of the vote. He replaced Enrique Centeno shortly after the elections. The municipality is divided into one parishes; General en Jefe José Laurencio Silva (the parish's name was officially changed on December 30, 1994, it was formerly known as Tinaco Parish). For the 2008 mayor's elections there are three major candidates these are:

- Enrique Centeno
- Francisco Ojeda
- Celida Veloz
