= Anzoátegui Municipality =

Anzoátegui Municipality Municipio Anzoátegui
- Municipality
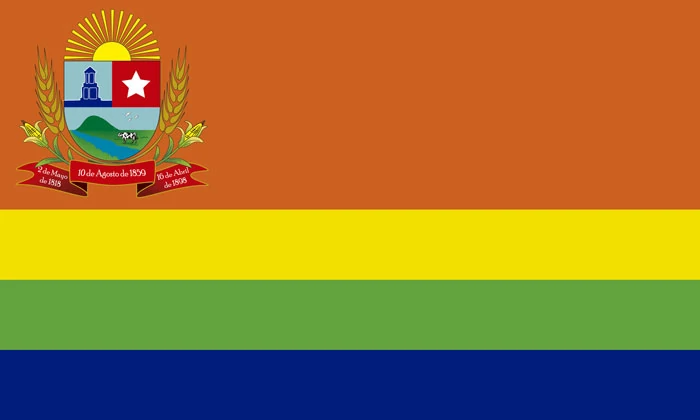
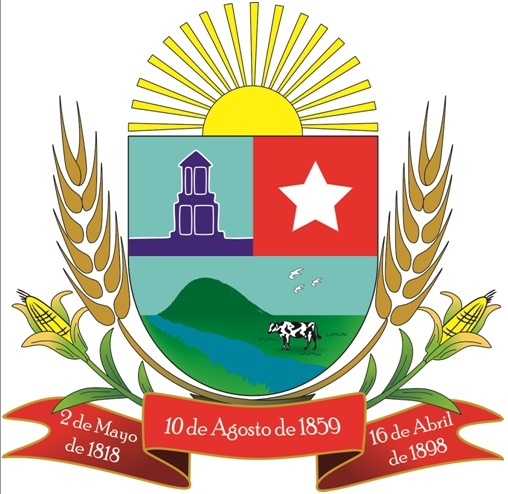
- Flag Coat of arms

- Location in Cojedes

- Location in Venezuela
- Coordinates: 9°34′59″N 68°51′20″W
- Country: Venezuela
- State: Cojedes
- Municipal seat: Cojedes

Government
  - Mayor: Víctor Gil Blanco (VVC)

Area
  - Total: 902.9 km^{2} (348.6 sq mi)

Population (2011)
  - Total: 17,030
  - Density: 18.86/km^{2} (48.85/sq mi)
- Time zone: UTC−4 (VET)
- Area code(s): 0258
- Website: Official website

The Anzoátegui Municipality is one of the nine municipalities (municipios) that makes up the Venezuelan state of Cojedes and, according to the 2011 census by the National Institute of Statistics of Venezuela, the municipality has a population of 17,030. The town of Cojedes is the shire town of the Anzoátegui Municipality.

== Demographics ==
The Anzoátegui Municipality, according to a 2007 population estimate by the National Institute of Statistics of Venezuela, has a population of 16,333 (up from 14,354 in 2000). This amounts to 5.4% of the state's population. The municipality's population density is 19.65 inhabitants per square kilometre (50.9/sq mi).

== Government ==
The mayor of the Anzoátegui Municipality is Luis Linares, re-elected on October 31, 2004, with 44% of the vote. The municipality is divided into two parishes; Cojedes and Juan de Mata Suárez.
