= List of towns in Venezuela named El Pao =

El Pao is the name of several towns in Venezuela:

- El Pao, Anzoátegui, also known as El Pao de Barcelona, in the state of Anzoátegui, elevation 222m, 08°48′N 064°38′W
- El Pao, Barinas in the state of Barinas, elevation 40m, 08°30′N 068°03′W
- El Pao, Cojedes in the state of Cojedes, elevation 132m, 09°38′N 068°08′W
- El Pao, Monagas in the state of Monagas, elevation 892m, 10°11′N 063°45′W
- El Pao, Trujillo in the state of Trujillo, elevation 1231m, 09°19′N 070°41′W
