= Ezequiel Zamora Municipality, Cojedes =

Ezequiel Zamora Municipality Municipio Ezequiel Zamora
- Municipality
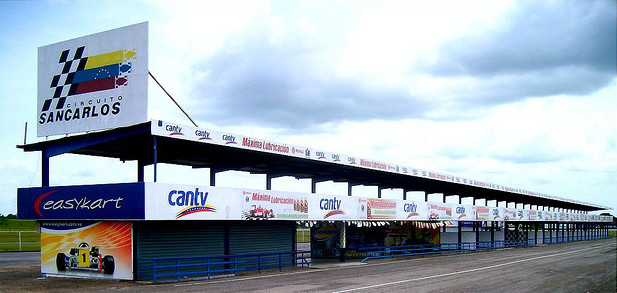

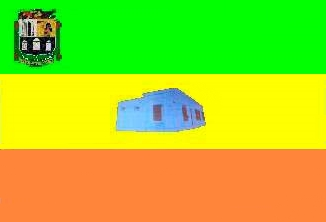
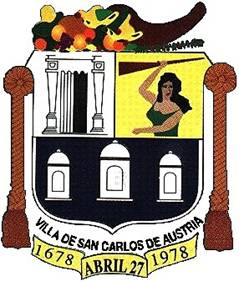
- Flag Coat of arms

- Location in Cojedes

- Location in Venezuela
- Coordinates: 9°43′36″N 68°38′26″W
- Country: Venezuela
- State: Cojedes

Government
  - Mayor: Luis Mireles Ruíz (MUD)

Area
  - Total: 1,360.1 km^{2} (525.1 sq mi)

Population (2011)
  - Total: 106,760
  - Density: 78.494/km^{2} (203.30/sq mi)
- Time zone: UTC−4 (VET)
- Area code(s): 0258

The San Carlos Municipality is one of the nine municipalities (municipios) that makes up the Venezuelan state of Cojedes and, according to the 2011 census by the National Institute of Statistics of Venezuela, the municipality has a population of 106,760. The city of San Carlos is the municipal seat of the San Carlos Municipality.

== History ==
Father Capuchino Fray Pedro de Berja founded the city of San Carlos de Austria on April 27, 1678.

== Demographics ==
The San Carlos Municipality, according to a 2007 population estimate by the National Institute of Statistics of Venezuela, has a population of 97,860 (up from 85,402 in 2000). This amounts to 32.6% of the state's population. The municipality's population density is 53.1 inhabitants per square kilometre (138/sq mi).

== Government ==
The mayor of the San Carlos Municipality is José Jesús Betancourt Sanoja, re-elected on October 31, 2004, with 52% of the vote. The municipality is divided into three parishes; “San Carlos de Austria, Juan Angel Bravo, and Manuel Manrique.

== Sites of interest ==
=== Religious buildings ===
- Catedral de San Carlos
- Iglesia Santo Domingo
- Iglesia San Juan

=== Squares and parks ===
- Plaza Bolívar
