= Cabruta =

- Town
- Location within Venezuela
- Coordinates: 07°39′32″N 66°15′25″W
- Country: Venezuela
- State: Guárico
- Municipality: Las Mercedes

Area
  - Total: 2 km^{2} (0.77 sq mi)

Population
  - Total: 5,500
- (2013)
- Climate: Aw

Cabruta is a Venezuelan fishing town on the Orinoco river in Las Mercedes Municipality, Guárico State, site of a Jesuit mission, and the site of a proposed bridge across the Orinoco to Caicara, Bolívar State.

== History ==
In 1531 by Diego de Ordaz mentioned the indigenous village there, with the name 'Cabritu'. In 1556, Martin Lopez mentioned that it was an Arawak village with the name 'Caburute'. The 17th century saw a number of plans to fortify Cabruta, and in 1643 Juan de Ochoa Gresala y Aguirre was authorized to establish a Spanish port and found a city to be called 'Triunfo de la Cruz y Nueva Cantabria'. However, it was not until 1647 that Miguel de Ochogavia y Jacinto de Carvajal actually arrived, coming down the Apure River, and with the help of chief Maguare began the improvements. Just eleven years later (1658) the Spanish left Cabruta. It wasn't until 1720 that two capuchine missionaries, formerly with the gold-seeking expedition of Marcos de Castro, settled there and their mission was approved in 1722, but then abandoned to be taken up by the Jesuit Bernardo Rotella in 1733.

== Economy ==
There was a fish processing and freezing center in Cabruta, which closed in 1998. Cotton is grown in the surrounding area and a textile processing plant has been proposed. The Venezuelan government has also proposed building an oil refinery there.

== Geography ==
Cabruta is located near the geographical center of Venezuela. This was one of the reasons that proposals were made for constructing a planned city as a new capital for Venezuela near Cabruta. These proposals were made and abandoned in the 1970s.

=== Local Geography ===
Several hills surround the vicinity of Cabruta. These are

- Cerro Cabruta, a 200m hill 1.74 km (1.08 miles) west of Cabruta.
- Cerro Caribe, a 126m hill 3.46 km (2.14 miles) northwest of Cabruta.

== Transport ==
In 2006, a railway to Cabruta was commenced, but the project is on hold, as is Puente Mercosur, the associated bridge across the Orinoco for road and rail, which has been planned as the third crossing of this river.

== See also ==
- Railway stations in Venezuela
