= Apure River =

Apure
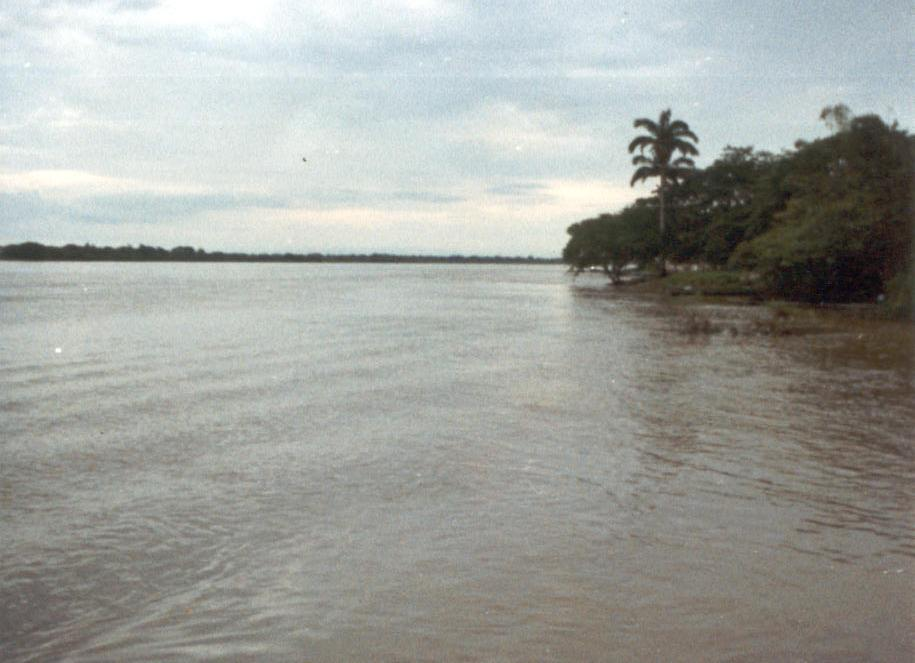
- Bridge over the Apure River, San Fernando, Venezuela

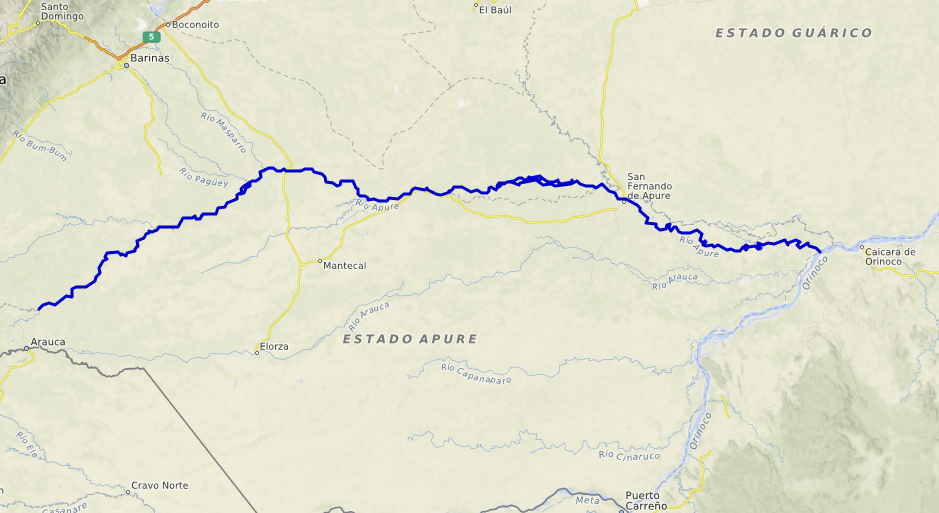

Location
- Countries: Colombia; Venezuela

Physical characteristics
- Source
  - location: Venezuela
  - elevation: 3,912 m (12,835 ft) (Páramo Batallón)
- Mouth
  - location: Orinoco 20 km (12 mi) west of Cabruta
  - coordinates: 7°40′N 66°25′W
- Length: 1,038 km (645 mi)
- Basin size: 167,000 km^{2} (64,000 sq mi)
- Discharge
  - average: 2,300 m^{3}/s (81,000 cu ft/s)

The Apure River is a river of southwestern Venezuela, formed by the confluence of the Sarare and Uribante near Guasdualito, in Venezuela, at 7°15′N 70°40′W, and flowing across the Llanos into the Orinoco. It provides significant transportation in the area.

== Origin ==
Most of the streams that ultimately form the Apure originate in the Venezuelan highlands of the Cordillera de Mérida and only some minor affluents of the Sarare River come from the Cordillera Oriental in the Colombian Andes, entering Venezuela at the confluence with the Oirá River which has a very narrow and steep valley and forms the border between the two countries for 41 kilometres (25 mi). The Oirá River starts in Venezuela and its thalweg forms that border for several kilometres downstream. The Uribante River is longer than the Sarare and flows from the Táchira-Mérida border, near the town of Pregonero. The Apure's drainage area thus includes the slopes of both the Colombian (less than 0.5 percent of its total area) and the Venezuelan Andes.

== Course ==
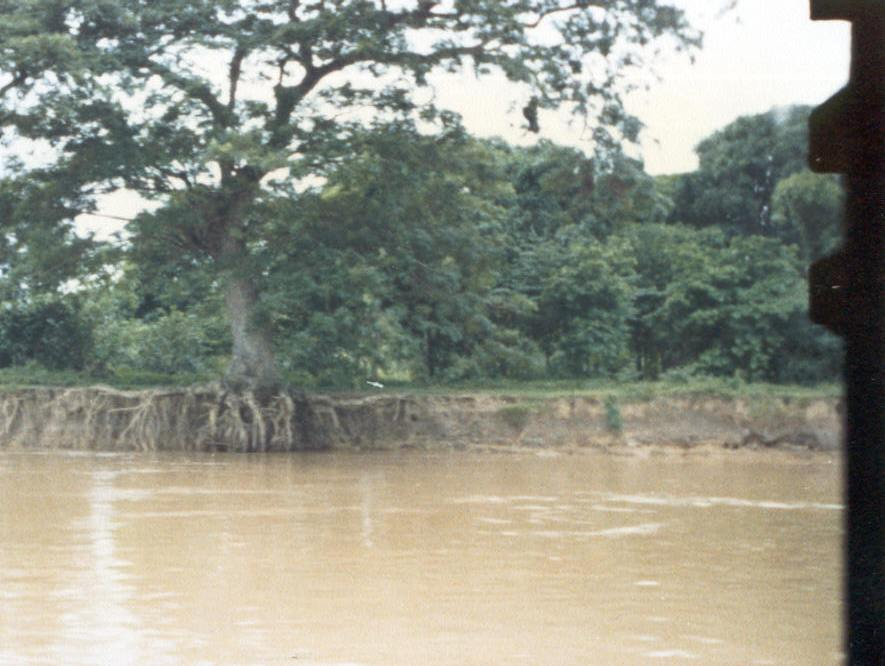
Erosion at the left bank of the Apure river, near the small town of El Samán (Apure State, Venezuela)

From the point where the Uribante joins the Sarare, the Apure flows eastward across the Venezuelan llanos, into the Orinoco. The Apure flows primarily through Apure State including San Fernando before joining the Orinoco River via six braided river branches west of Cabruta, Guárico State, across from Caicara, Bolívar State, at about 7°40′N 66°25′W. The Apure is 1,038 kilometres (645 mi) long from the Uribante's starting point to the Orinoco. It is navigable for about 800 kilometres (500 mi) above the Orinoco, where it has a sluggish course across the llanos, despite rapids at about the 180-kilometre (110 mi) mark. From the north, its principal tributaries are the Caparo, Portuguesa and Guarico. The Caucagua is its only major tributary from the south. Because of the flatness of the land its meanders and bayous to the south are mingled with those of the Arauca River creating an extensive area which is flooded annually. However, both rivers keep independent channels during dry season.
