= La Blanquera =

Coordinates: 9°39′40″N 68°35′40″W

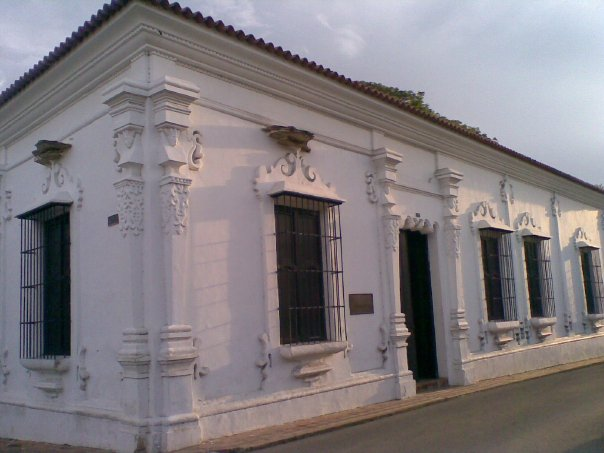
La Blanquera today in San Carlos, Cojedes

La Blanquera (Palace of the Blanco family) is a Spanish Colonial building in the city of San Carlos in Venezuela. This house was built by a wealthy family of cattle ranchers from the lands of Andalusia, Spain, by the name of Blanco y Salazar during the second half of the 18th century. This house is white and has Baroque decorative features including columns with aborigines wearing feathered headgear. According to the traditional story, Joseph Blanco y Salazar built and used this house as a place of retirement for him and his family after the pacification of the Apure aborigines.

== The Blancos, discoverers of Apure ==
The conquistador Joséph (José) Blanco y Salazar was born in October 1690 in the Spanish village of Galaroza in the archbishopric of Seville, Spain, the son of the Alférez Juan Martin Blanco and María Salazar y Sánchez. He traveled to Venezuela when was just a boy around 1702 at the side of his uncle and father of his future wife, Francisco Salazar y Sánchez. There he joined the Third Order of Saint Francis to comply with the royal decree of colonization of the Indies of 1676. Don José, along with his ancestors, participated in the conquest of what is today the estate of Apure looking to also expand his congested cattle lands in San Carlos.

On 28 August 1726 he married his maternal cousin, Clara Teresa Salazar y Sánchez, daughter of Francisco. The couple had seven children: María Rosalía, José Santiago, Sebastián Fabián, Alejandro, Juan Martín, Juana Josefa, y Francisco Antonio. For his legendary exploits, these conquered lands were granted to him by the King of Spain through a royal decree...

"As a gift, in thankfulness for having been the Discoverers of Apure and its Founders"

== La Blanquera today ==
The illustrious home was expropriated as abandoned on 20 October 1942 by the local government. In 1977, at a ceremony where legitimate descendants of the Blanquera succession participated (today the Guillén family), it was declared a historical monument.

Italian architect Graziano Gasparini spearheaded the reconstruction of the house that now serves as culture house to the people of San Carlos. Inside there are colonial objects, including an old church bell from 1801 and historical paintings and photographs.
