= Las Mercedes Municipality =

Las Mercedes Municipality Municipio Las Mercedes
- Municipality
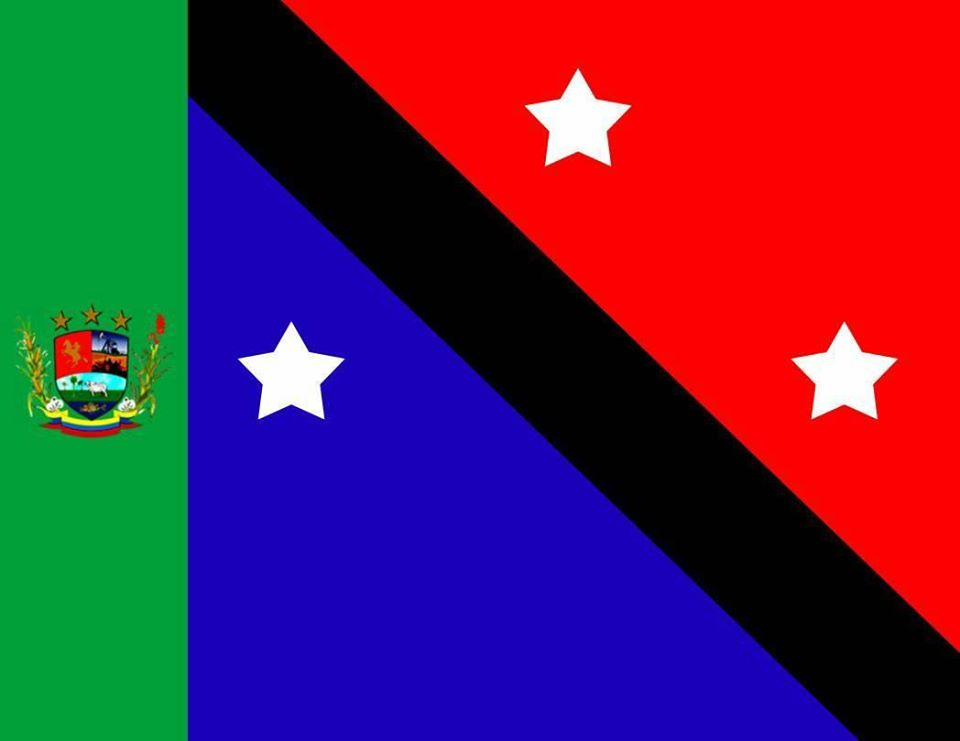
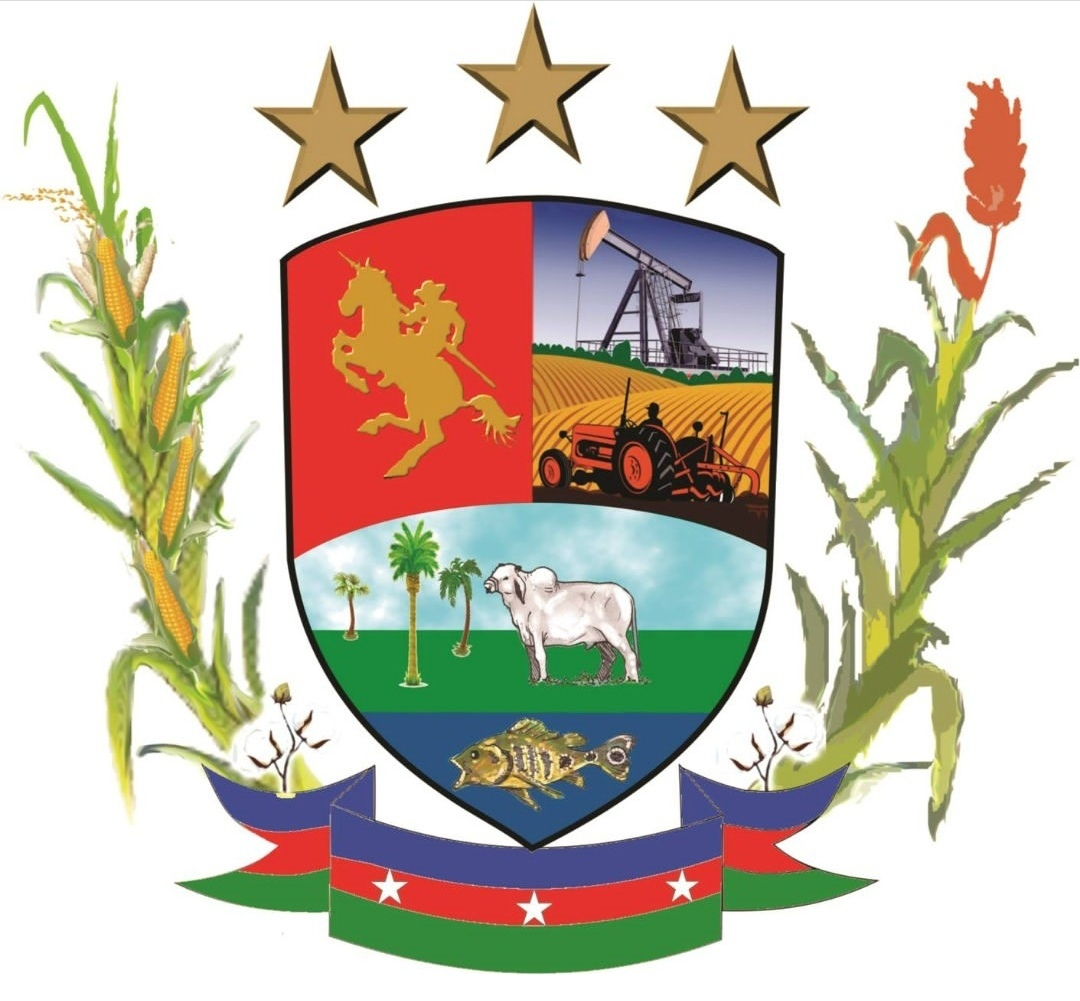
- Flag Coat of arms

- Location in Guárico

- Location in Venezuela
- Coordinates: 8°30′37″N 66°30′11″W
- Country: Venezuela
- State: Guárico

Area
  - Total: 8,056.1 km^{2} (3,110.5 sq mi)

Population (2010)
  - Total: 31,825
  - Density: 3.9504/km^{2} (10.232/sq mi)
- Time zone: UTC−4 (VET)
- Area code(s): 0238
- Website: Official website

The Las Mercedes Municipality is one of the 15 municipalities (municipios) that makes up the central Venezuelan state of Guárico and, according to a 2010 population estimate by the National Institute of Statistics of Venezuela, the municipality has a population of 31,825.

== Overview ==
The town of Las Mercedes del Llano is the shire town of the Las Mercedes Municipality.

The Municipality includes the 4.8 km Third Orinoco River Crossing, between Cabruta and Caicara del Orinoco in Bolívar.

== See also ==
- Guárico
- Municipalities of Venezuela
