= Machiques =

- Municipality

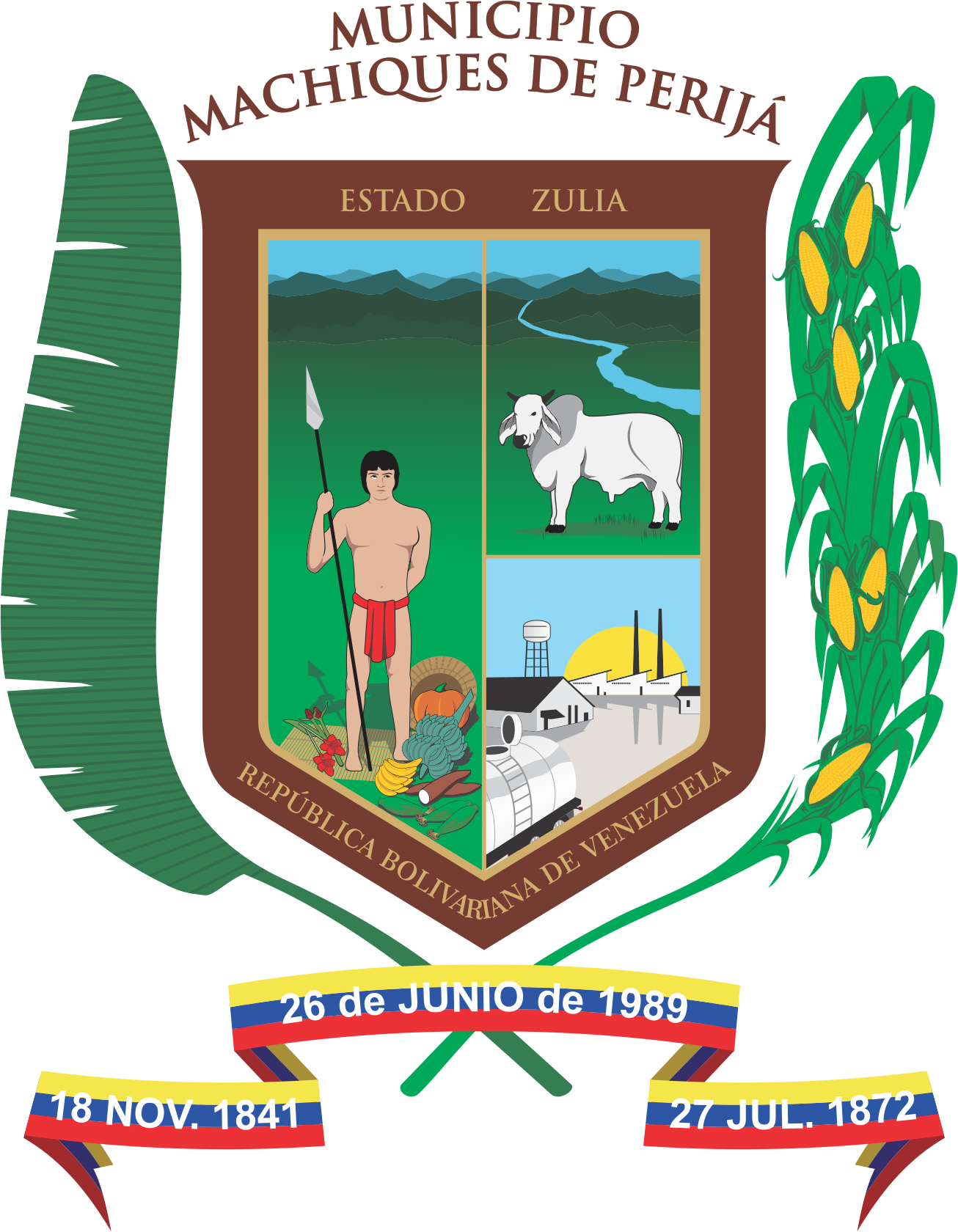
- Flag Coat of arms

- Machiques shown within the state of Zulia

- Location within Venezuela
- Coordinates: 10°04′N 72°34′W
- Country: Venezuela
- State: Zulia
- Municipality: Machiques de Perijá
- Founded: 8 November 1841

Population (2011)
  - Urban: 63,000
  - Metro: 122,734
- Time zone: UTC−4 (VET)
- Climate: Aw

Machiques is a city in Zulia State, Venezuela, located in the northwest portion of the country. It is close to the border with Colombia. The area's main economic activity is cattle raising. On 16 August 2005, West Caribbean Airways Flight 708, en route from Panama City to Fort-de-France, stalled and crashed in a mountainous area of the municipality, killing all 160 people on board.

== Transport ==
It is proposed that the city receive a railway station on the new national railway network.

== See also ==
- Railway stations in Venezuela
