= Machiques de Perijá Municipality =

Municipality in Zulia, Venezuela

Machiques de Perijá Municipality Municipio Machiques de Perijá
- Municipality
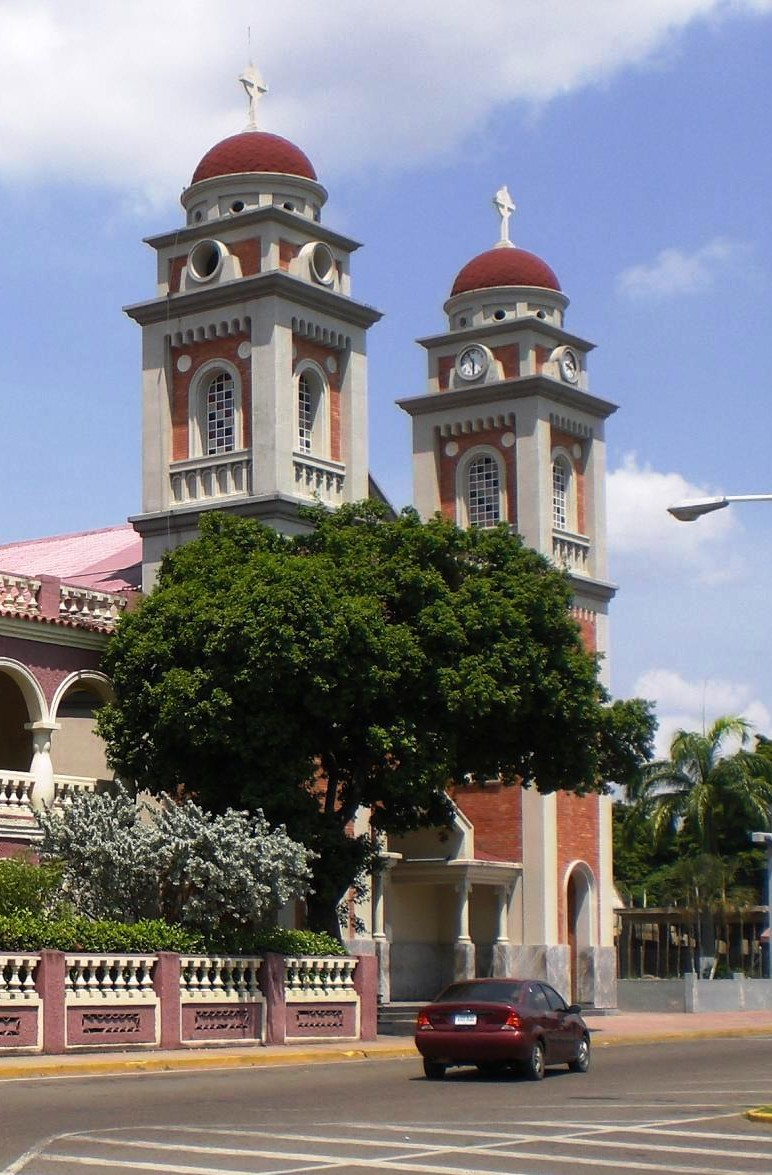
- Diocese of Machiques

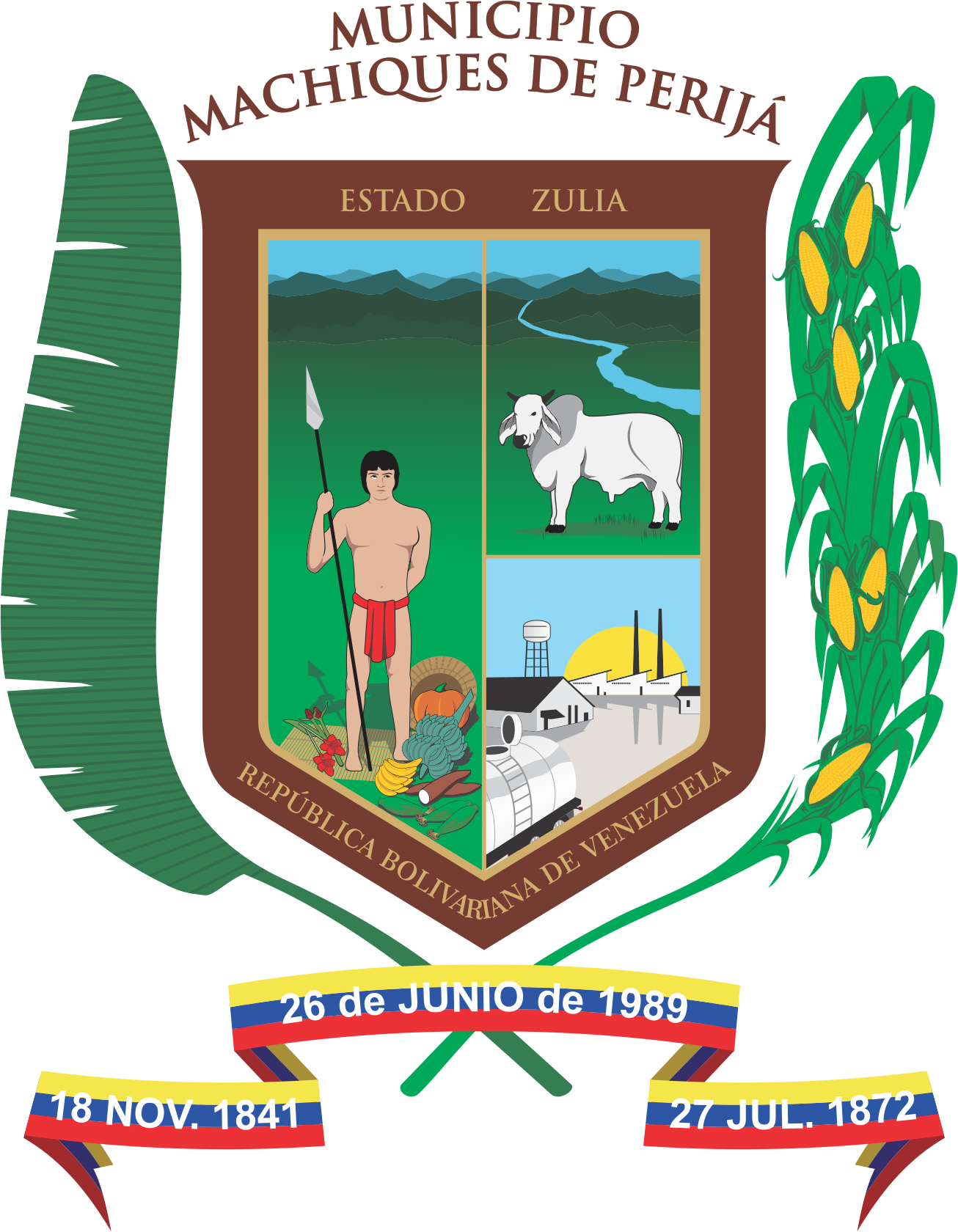
- Flag Seal

- Location in Zulia

- Location in Venezuela
- Country: Venezuela
- State: Zulia
- Founded: 1980
- Municipal seat: Machiques

Government
  - Mayor: Marco Perrotta Ysoldi (PSUV)

Area
  - Total: 10,411.3 km^{2} (4,019.8 sq mi)

Population (2023)
  - Total: 132,734
  - Density: 12.7490/km^{2} (33.0198/sq mi)
- Time zone: UTC−4 (VET)

Machiques de Perijá Municipality is located in Zulia, Venezuela. It was founded in 1980. The municipality has a total surface of 9493 km^{2} and it has some 132,734 inhabitant (2023 census). Its capital is Machiques.
