= El Pao, Cojedes =

- Coordinates: 9°38′N 68°08′W

El Pao is a town in Cojedes and seat of the Pao de San Juan Bautista Municipality. Its economy is mostly agricultural.

The town was founded in 1661 by a Franciscan mission.

== Geography ==
El Palo is located at an elevation of 132m above sea level.

== Points of interest ==
The town has one of the oldest churches in Venezuela, the church of San Juan Bautista, first built in 1661. It also has a colonial church built in 1782.

The town is located adjacent to the Pao dam.

== See also ==
- List of towns in Venezuela named El Pao
