= Pao de San Juan Bautista Municipality =

Pao de San Juan Bautista Municipality Municipio Pao de San Juan Bautista
- Municipality
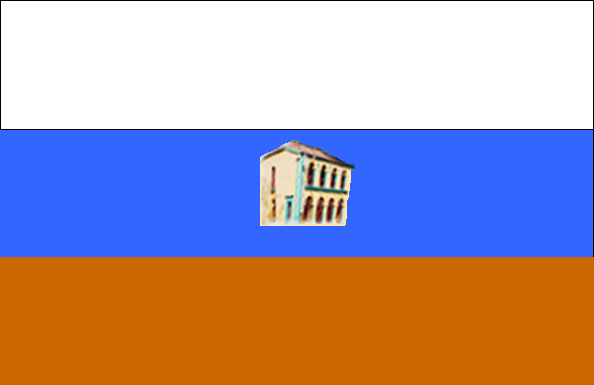
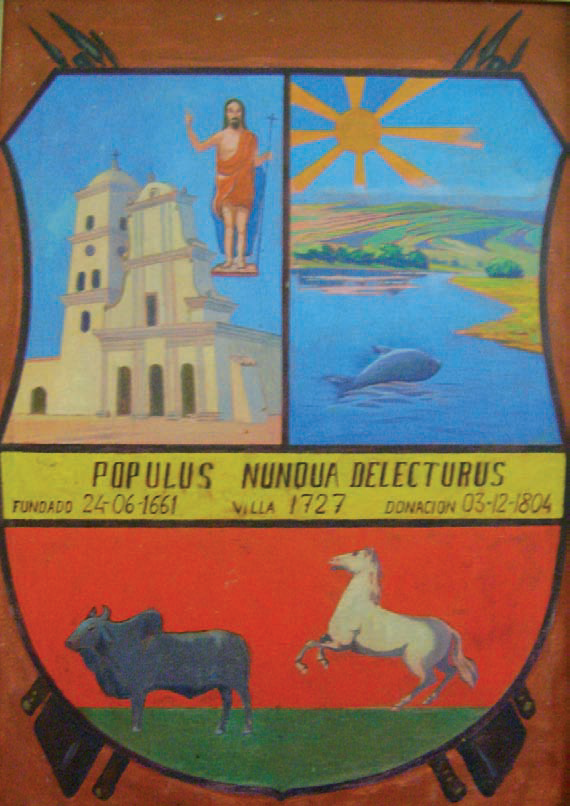
- Flag Coat of arms

- Location in Cojedes

- Location in Venezuela
- Coordinates: 9°22′58″N 68°06′55″W
- Country: Venezuela
- State: Cojedes
- Municipal seat: El Pao

Government
  - Mayor: Darkenedis Espinoza Oviedo (MUD)

Area
  - Total: 4,931.0 km^{2} (1,903.9 sq mi)

Population (2011)
  - Total: 16,810
  - Density: 3.409/km^{2} (8.829/sq mi)
- Time zone: UTC−4 (VET)
- Area code(s): 0258

The Pao de San Juan Bautista Municipality is one of the nine municipalities (municipios) that makes up the Venezuelan state of Cojedes and, according to the 2011 census by the National Institute of Statistics of Venezuela, the municipality has a population of 16,810. The town of El Pao is the municipal seat of the Pao de San Juan Bautista Municipality.

== Demographics ==
The Pao de San Juan Bautista Municipality, according to a 2007 population estimate by the National Institute of Statistics of Venezuela, has a population of 15,730 (up from 13,840 in 2000). This amounts to 5.2% of the state's population. The municipality's population density is 3.09 inhabitants per square kilometre (8.0/sq mi).

== Government ==
The mayor of the Pao de San Juan Bautista Municipality is Juan de la Cruz Aparicio Rojas, re-elected on October 31, 2004, with 68% of the vote. The municipality is divided into one parish; El Pao.
