= San Fernando de Apure =

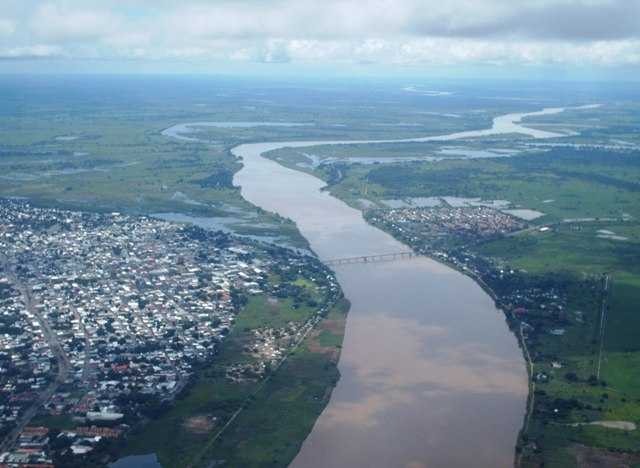
- Aerial view of San Fernando, Puerto Miranda and the Apure river

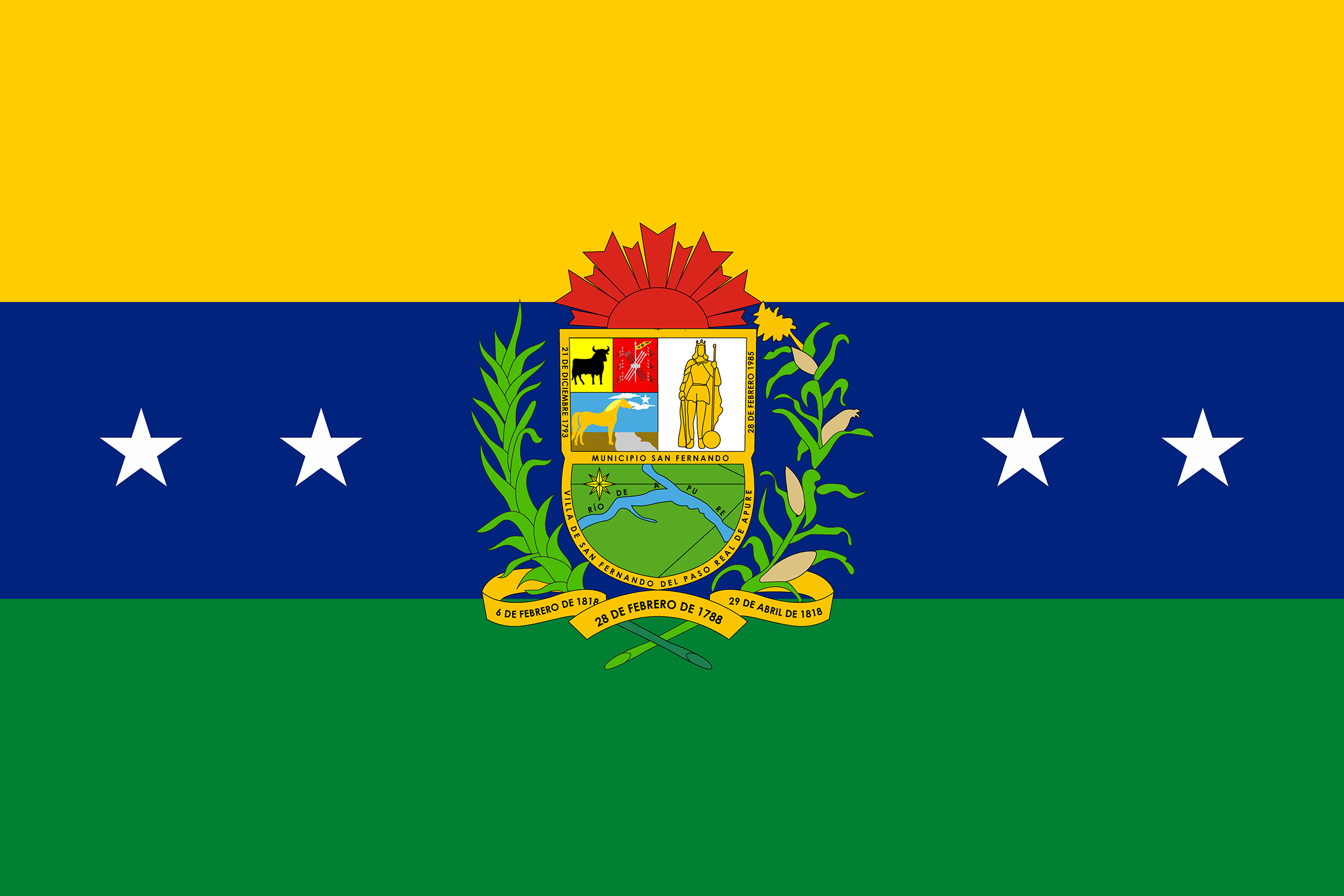
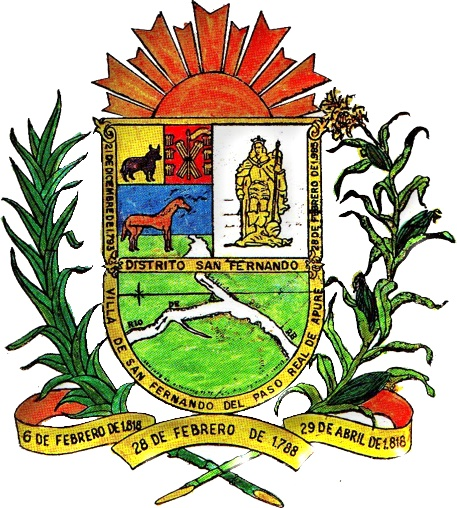
- Flag Coat of arms
- Nickname: "Ciudad de la Esperanza" (English: "City of Hope")
- Motto: None
- Location within Apure Location within Venezuela
- Coordinates: 7.894°N 67.473°W
- Country: Venezuela
- State: Apure
- Counties: San Fernando

Government
  - Mayor: Yoel Lisandro Solórzano (PSUV)

Area
  - Total: 5,982 km^{2} (2,310 sq mi)
- Elevation: 47 m (154 ft)

Population (2011 census)
  - Total: 165,135
  - Density: 27.61/km^{2} (71.50/sq mi)
- Time zone: UTC−4 (VET)
- Climate: Aw
- Website: Alcaldía de San Fernando

San Fernando de Apure (Spanish pronunciation: [saɱ feɾˈnando ðe aˈpuɾe]) is a city in Apure State in Venezuela. The population of the municipality area is 165,135 (2011 census). The 18th century exports included heron feathers (for pens) and animal hides.

The “Maria Nieves” bridge across the Apure River at San Fernando commenced construction in 1959 under the direction of President Rómulo Betancourt, and was opened February 1, 1961. It cost 8.5 million bolivars. Notable is the Casa de Bolivar, a National Historical Monument, at the intersection of Comercio St. and Independencia St. It is the 18th Century Armory, and was the dwelling of General Miguel Gerrero. Now it contains a public library as well as the cultural offices of the municipality. It was restored in 1983.

== History ==
San Fernando was founded on February 28, 1788 by order of the Captain of Infantry of the Royal Armies Fernando Miyares y González, military commander, politician and governor of the then newly formed Province of Barinas (1786), and executed by Lieutenant Major Juan Antonio Rodríguez and Fray Buenaventura de Benaocaz, under the denomination of "Villa de San Fernando del Paso Real de Apure".

The foundation was witnessed by about 200 natives in a ceremony where Lieutenant Juan Antonio Rodriguez made a recognition of the land, with which the act describes that the property enjoys good constellation, pure air, abundance of land for labor and breeding, wood for factories, firewood and running water. The Plaza Mayor (now Plaza Bolívar) was then demarcated and a cross was placed on the site where the church would be erected, and the Lieutenant exclaimed: "The Villa Real de San Fernando is hereby founded!"8 Subsequently, in December 1783, given its strategic importance in the domination of Los Llanos, it was officially granted the title of Villa. (Ville)

Between March 27 and 30, 1800, the Prussian-born explorer Alexander von Humboldt visited San Ferando. Five years later (1815), Fray Joaquín María drew up the second map of the town along with a literal description of its limits and jurisdiction.

From the decade of the 30's of the XIX century, educational activity began to take shape in San Fernando, when in 1831, Master Juan Castellanos founded the first private school for minors. Then the Second Category Federal School was created in 1875 and at the end of that century the Leon XIII Federal School was also founded.

The chronicles of the city record that on June 21, 1859, during the Federal War, the Federal Army set fire to a large part of the city, placing it on the verge of destruction.

Then, by 1908, the streets of San Fernando started from a north-south line 100 meters from the east side of the cemetery (now known as the old cemetery) and were usually called: first, second, third, fourth and fifth, the last one reaching the southern end. Between the first and the fifth the village was delimited. Today they are part of the central or historic center of the city with the names of Calle Comercio, Calle Bolívar, Calle Sucre, Calle Páez and Calle Muñoz respectively. At that time, San Fernando was a port on the banks of the Apure River. The main area of the port was about 400 meters long, which was extended a little further to the west when the Barbarito Palace was built. Today the port only appears in historical records, and much of it is now dry land with urban development, where it was once the domain of the Apure River.

At the beginning of the 20th century San Fernando enjoyed great commercial and industrial activity. Food factories (pasta, canned food, sausages, preserves and others), candle factories, ice, heron feather distributors (since 1884), leather and alligator skins, among others, were developed there. Trade maintained a strong relationship with Europe, the main destination of exported products. This activity declined sharply when the demand for exports decreased, when the interest in navigation was reduced due to the development of land trade with the development of the railroad: there was the Gran Ferrocarril de Venezuela line (Caracas to Puerto Cabello) which was to be completed with a branch to San Fernando de Apure, and the development of road trade with the Ford Tablitas (Ford model T, with wooden boards for cargo), which became a true revolution due to its versatility and resistance.

In 1914, the chronicles record the arrival of the first automobile in San Fernando. It is an anecdotal fact. It was a Ford Model T owned by Don Jesús María Hernández M., bought in Cagua by his son-in-law, General Waldino Arriaga.

Secondary education began in the city in 1931 with the creation of the Miranda School, which would later be transformed into the Lazo Martí School. Along the same lines, the Sagrada Familia school was also created in 1953. By 1964, artistic training was consolidated with the founding of the Juan Lovera School of Plastic Arts.

In 1916, San Fernando experienced a great overflow of the Apure River, which was registered as catastrophic by the press of the time. Consequently, a project for the construction of a diversion channel to the Portuguesa River in the neighboring State of Guárico was taken to the then National Congress (now the National Assembly). After approving it in 1917, in February of that year the authorization to purchase privately owned land for the construction of the diversion was published in the official gazette. On March 2, according to publication in the official gazette of the State of Apure, the citizens Fabián and Juan Rafael Michelangeli, María de Domínguez, Fabián Michelangeli (son), Miguel Ángel and Gullermo Michelangeli, all owners of the land, jointly donated a space of 20,000 square meters, with the sole purpose of "saving the city of San Fernando from destruction and ruins". On June 12, 1917, the Apure River diversion canal was inaugurated. The canal is currently located on the north bank of the María Nieves Bridge.

Higher education studies began in 1976 with the creation of the Apure Center of the Universidad Nacional Experimental Simón Rodríguez. The following year the UNELLEZ was founded and in 1978 the local center of the National Open University was opened. At present, San Fernando maintains a wide educational activity at all levels, with countless primary and secondary schools and universities.

== Geography ==
The relief of San Fernando is totally a plain. Natural land elevations do not exist, and the visibility of the horizon can reach up to 10 km. Some high barriers can be artificially by engineer installations for the prevention of floods. The city is established on humid grounds, and for this reason civil constructions superior to 5 levels are not permitted. In this sense, San Fernando projects a flat skyline.

=== Climate ===
Due to its location in the center of the Venezuelan plains, San Fernando de Apure has a tropical monsoon climate (Köppen Am). The daily annual average is 27.8 °C or 82.0 °F. The humidity can reach more than 79%, due to its location next to the 300-meter (1,000 ft) wide Apure River.

The lowest temperature ever recorded is 13.6 °C (56.5 °F) on 24 October 1993.

Climate data for San Fernando de Apure (1991–2020, extremes 1961-2020)
Month	Jan	Feb	Mar	Apr	May	Jun	Jul	Aug	Sep	Oct	Nov	Dec	Year
Record high °C (°F)	38.8 (101.8)	39.6 (103.3)	40.0 (104.0)	39.9 (103.8)	38.9 (102.0)	37.1 (98.8)	39.6 (103.3)	37.9 (100.2)	35.6 (96.1)	35.9 (96.6)	37.2 (99.0)	37.5 (99.5)	40.0 (104.0)
Mean daily maximum °C (°F)	34.6 (94.3)	35.6 (96.1)	36.6 (97.9)	35.4 (95.7)	33.4 (92.1)	31.3 (88.3)	30.5 (86.9)	31.0 (87.8)	31.5 (88.7)	32.2 (90.0)	32.7 (90.9)	33.7 (92.7)	33.2 (91.8)
Daily mean °C (°F)	27.6 (81.7)	28.3 (82.9)	29.3 (84.7)	29.1 (84.4)	28.0 (82.4)	26.5 (79.7)	26.0 (78.8)	26.6 (79.9)	26.9 (80.4)	27.2 (81.0)	27.4 (81.3)	27.5 (81.5)	27.5 (81.5)
Mean daily minimum °C (°F)	22.8 (73.0)	23.5 (74.3)	24.6 (76.3)	24.9 (76.8)	24.5 (76.1)	23.6 (74.5)	23.4 (74.1)	23.8 (74.8)	23.9 (75.0)	23.7 (74.7)	23.8 (74.8)	23.4 (74.1)	23.8 (74.8)
Record low °C (°F)	17.8 (64.0)	15.9 (60.6)	19.0 (66.2)	13.9 (57.0)	15.0 (59.0)	17.1 (62.8)	17.8 (64.0)	18.3 (64.9)	18.9 (66.0)	13.6 (56.5)	19.3 (66.7)	18.2 (64.8)	13.6 (56.5)
Average rainfall mm (inches)	36.2 (1.43)	35.4 (1.39)	51.7 (2.04)	133.2 (5.24)	234.2 (9.22)	363.9 (14.33)	384.6 (15.14)	303.8 (11.96)	190.4 (7.50)	155.5 (6.12)	88.7 (3.49)	44.7 (1.76)	2,022.3 (79.62)
Average rainy days (≥ 1.0 mm)	13.2	12.4	14	17.2	20	22.8	24.9	22.7	19.4	17.8	15.5	13.3	213.2
Average relative humidity (%)	71.5	68.0	65.0	66.0	74.5	80.0	81.5	82.0	81.0	79.5	78.0	75.5	75.2
Mean monthly sunshine hours	294.5	274.4	285.2	216.0	189.1	162.0	176.7	186.0	204.0	241.8	261.0	288.3	2,779
Mean daily sunshine hours	9.5	9.8	9.2	7.2	6.1	5.4	5.7	6	6.8	7.8	8.7	9.3	7.6
Source 1: Instituto Nacional de Meteorología e Hidrología (INAMEH)(humidity 1970-1998)
Source 2: NOAA (temperatures-precipitation-days with precip) (sun 1961-1990)

=== Satellite towns of San Fernando ===
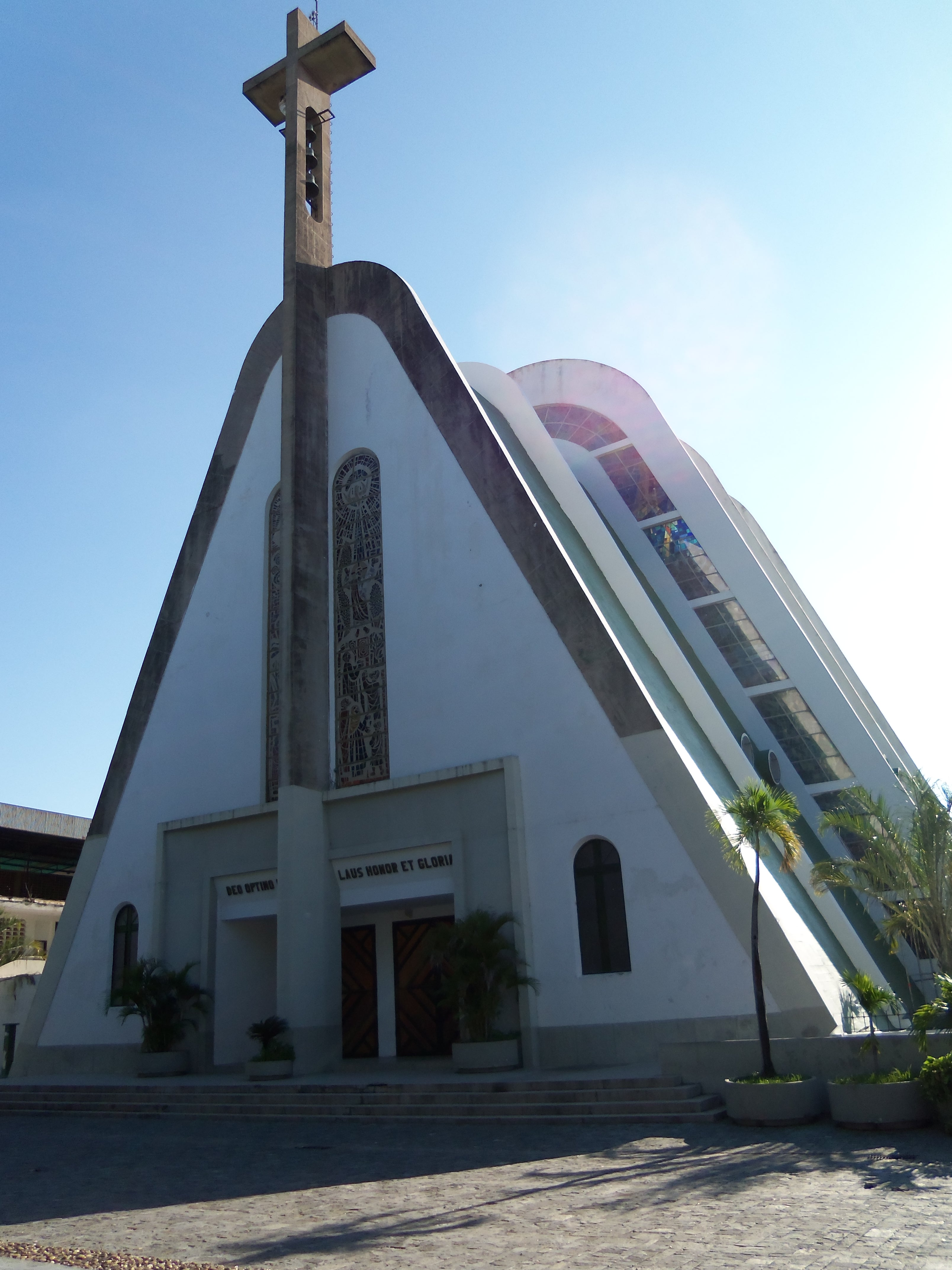
San Fernando de Apure Cathedral.

- Boca del Arichuna
- Boca del Tigre
- Boquerones
- Cabuyarito
- Coveras
- El Caimán
- El Jobal
- El Negro
- La Arenosa
- La Bendición
- La Culebra
- La Esperanza
- La Gomera
- La Maciera
- La Palmita
- La Rompia
- La Vega de Arauquita
- Las Peonias
- Los Dividiven
- Los Médanos
- Los Valentones
- Mangas

=== Parishes ===
- El Recreo
- Peñalver
- San Fernando
- San Rafael de Atamaica

=== Gallery Images ===
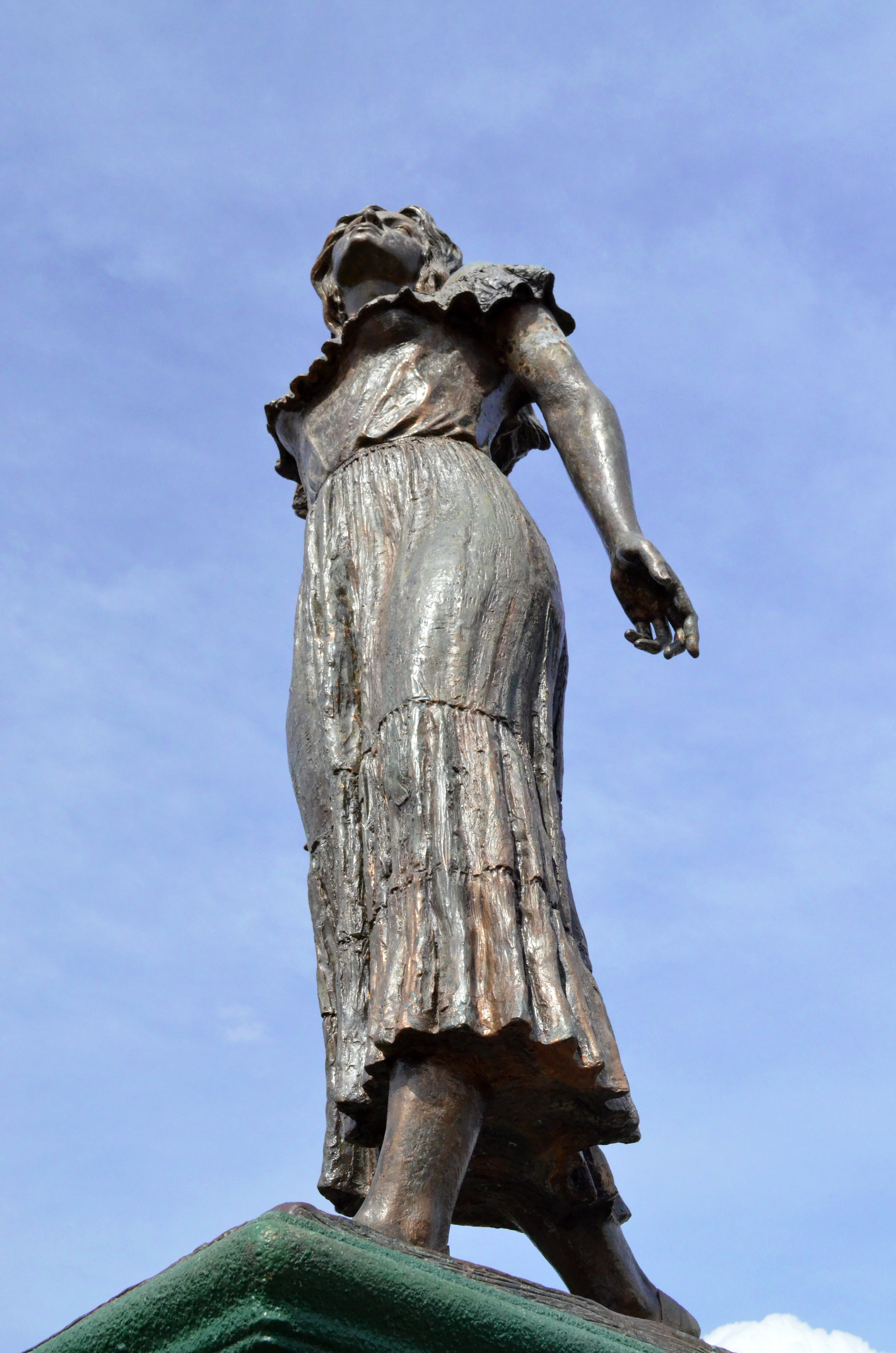
La Marisela Monument in Pedro Camejo

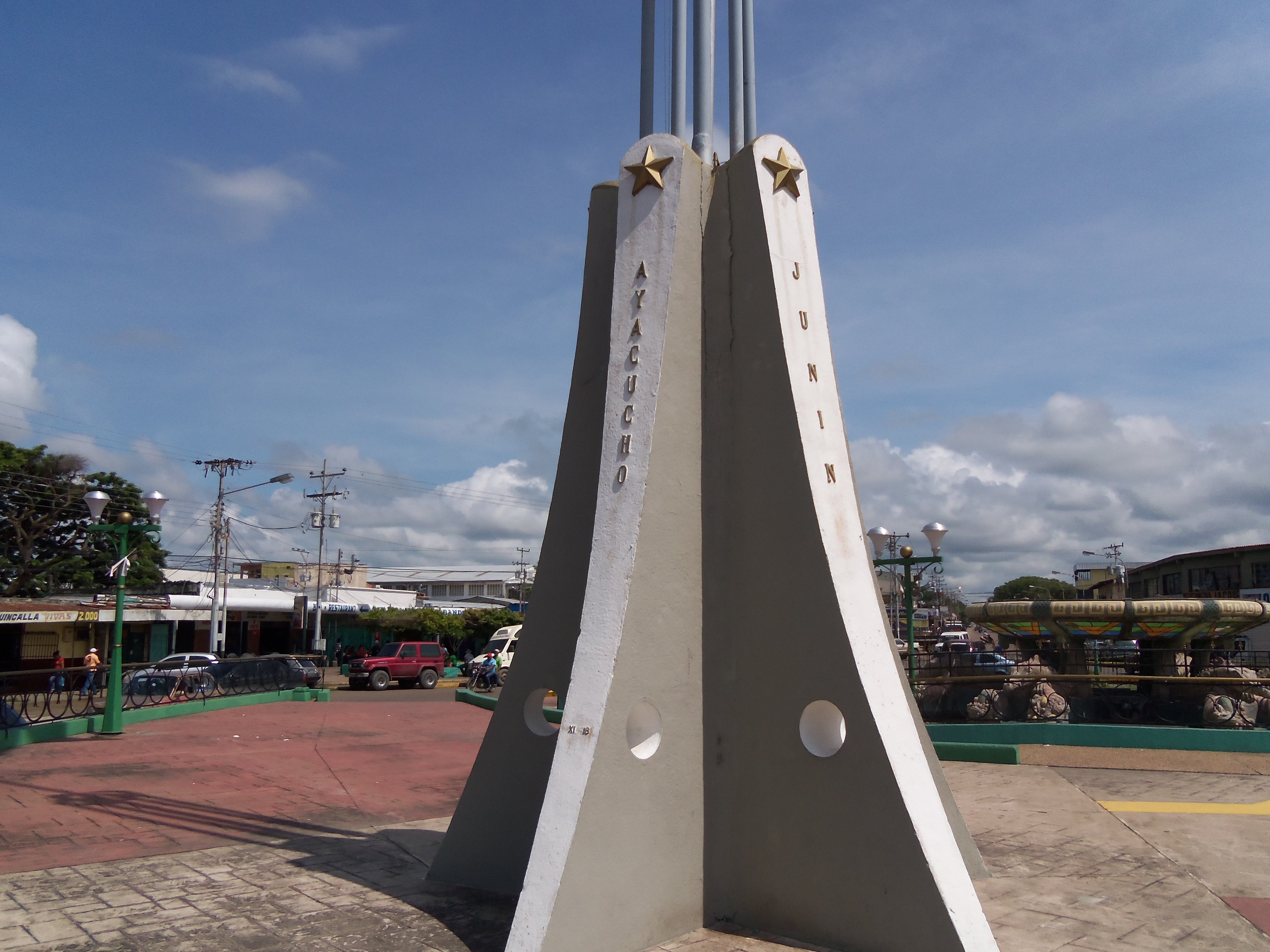
La Bandera Monument in San Fernando

== Demographics ==
The city is conformed by three urban nucleus: San Fernando de Apure, who covers all the metropolitan area in both shores of the Apure River, the satellite town of Biruaca to the west, which conforms another political jurisdiction, and to the east El Recreo parish. In agreement with the 2001 Venezuelan census, the urban area of San Fernando was conformed by 175.056 inhabitants, having Biruaca an intercensal rate of the 69,4% relative growth, and San Fernando the 36,1%. San Fernando lifestyle varies according to zone, wealth and age. Many young people of the metropolitan area characterize themselves to assume an urban style with fort influence of nonown cultures of the locality, reflecting in first term North America lifestyle, and soon expressions of the north region of Venezuela (mainly, Caracas lifestyle). The adult population of the city is charged of a mixed style, that goes from traditional llanero customs, to the nonown. In certain groups of the greater adult population a traditional lifestyle is present, with typical characteristics of the region. Towards in the peripheral zones of the city, can be appreciated very rustic customs and traditions, with little impact of nonown cultures.

== Colleges and universities ==
Universities in San Fernando include Simón Rodríguez University and Ezequiel Zamora Experimental National University of the Western Plains.

Other universities:

- Bicentennial University of Aragua
- Universidad José María Vargas
- University of Carabobo
- National Open University
- Libertador Pedagogical Experimental University
- National Experimental University of the Armed Forces

== See also ==
- List of cities in Venezuela
