= Tinaco =

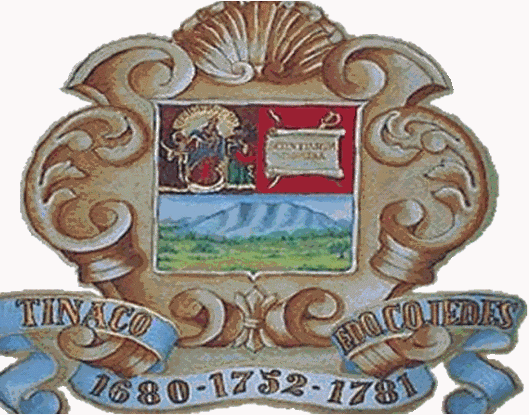
- Coat of arms

- Coordinates: 09°42′N 68°26′W

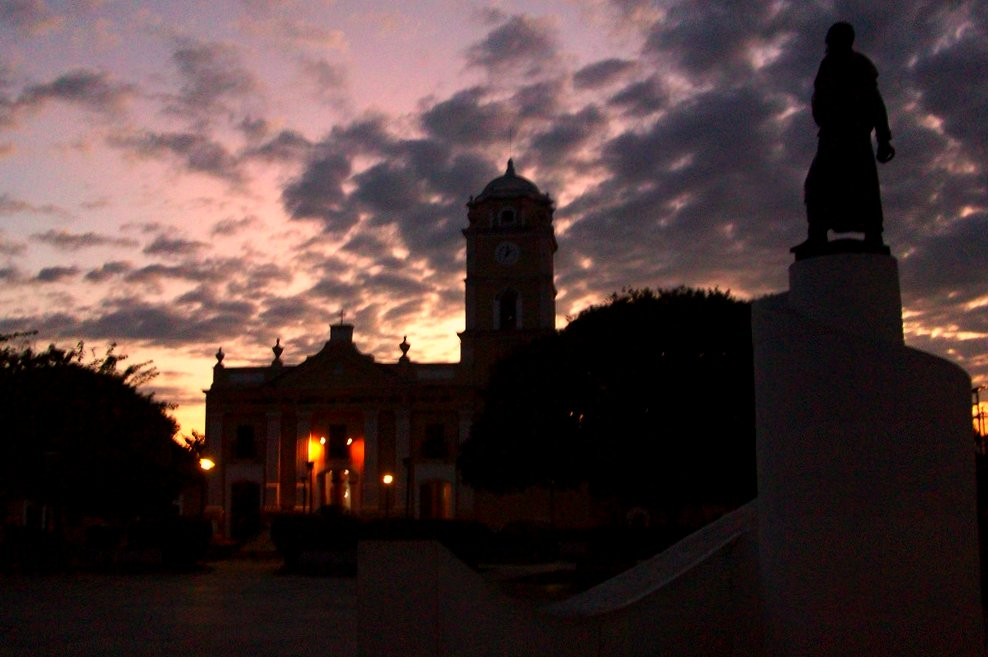
Tinaco, Cojedes State

Tinaco or El Tinaco is a small town located in the northern part of the Cojedes State in Venezuela. Population: 25,000. Although it doesn't have any air fields, it can be reached by car through a relatively wide two-lane road on a one-hour drive from Valencia, the capital of the Carabobo State. It is also a 20-minute drive away from San Carlos, the capital of the Cojedes State.

The main economic activity in Tinaco is agriculture, mostly cattle-raising. The weather is hot and humid almost all-year around, with heavy rains from July to December.

The current mayor is Francisco Ojeda and the currently most prominent citizen is Luis Rodríguez, the San Diego Padres infielder. The Tinaco Zip Code is 2206 and the Area Code is 258.

== See also ==
- List of cities and towns in Venezuela
