= East-West Railway, Venezuela =

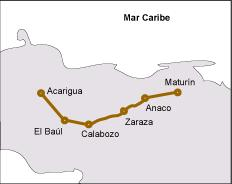
East-West Railway, Venezuelan railway system

The East-West Railway, Venezuela is a project to connect the east and the west of Venezuela by a route running south of the Venezuelan Coastal Range. Transporting both cargo and passengers, it would help to unite the country, strengthening links between cities the railway passes through, by connecting the East, West, Central West and Central South forming an interconnecting matrix of transport links.

In the 1990s the State Railways Institution had plans for many new sections of railway (see map in that article), including these -

== Section: Maturín - Anaco - Zaraza - Valle de la Pascua - Calabozo ==
(Length: 470 km) This section supports agricultural development, cattle and industrial areas, as well as bringing important changes to the economy, populous areas, allowing better use to take advantage of the network of main roads and layout of land. Also, it meets requirements of both cargo and passenger transport.

== Section: Turén - El Baúl - Calabozo ==
(Length: 210 km) The construction and operation of the railway section to find another route to provide development to influential areas next to the rivers Orinoco and Apure, through the identification, promotion and organisation of a series of productive and social activities. The aim is to occupy more land and to bring about further trade.

== Tinaco-Anaco railway ==
As part of a National Rail Development Plan, most of the East-West railway was incorporated in a planned standard gauge 290 mi (470 km) Tinaco-Anaco railway, inaugurated with Chinese funding in 2009. About a fifth of the work had been done by 2012. However, it appears construction stalled in 2013, though the route remains on the State Railways Institution's map of railways under construction.
