= Lima Blanco Municipality =

Lima Blanco Municipality Municipio Lima Blanco
- Municipality
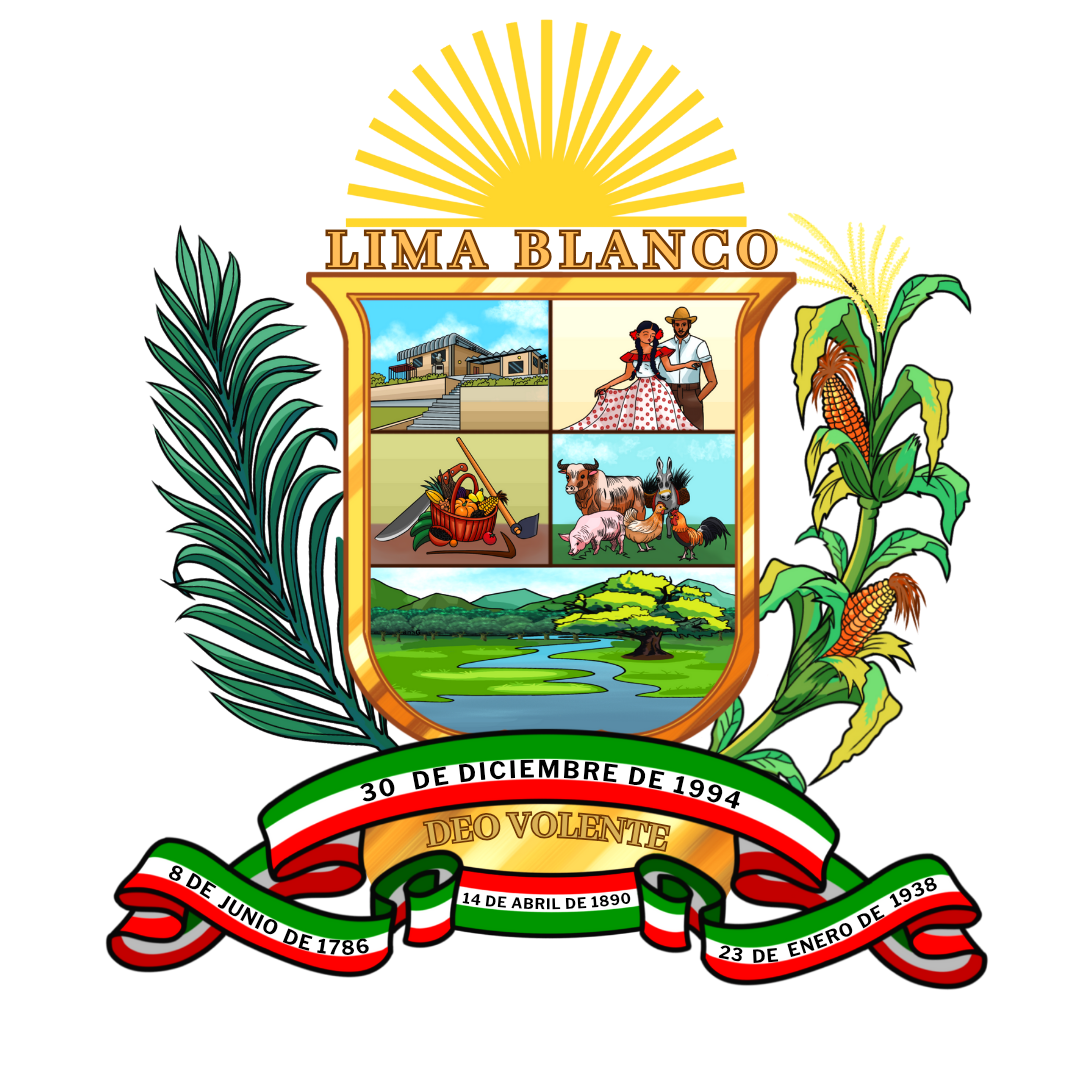
- Flag Coat of arms

- Location in Cojedes

- Location in Venezuela
- Coordinates: 9°48′17″N 68°23′58″W
- Country: Venezuela
- State: Cojedes

Government
  - Mayor: José Solórzano (VVC)

Area
  - Total: 150.6 km^{2} (58.1 sq mi)

Population (2011)
  - Total: 9,454
  - Density: 62.78/km^{2} (162.6/sq mi)
- Time zone: UTC−4 (VET)
- Area code(s): 0258
- Website: Official website

The Lima Blanco Municipality is one of the nine municipalities (municipios) that make up the Venezuelan state of Cojedes and, according to the 2011 census by the National Institute of Statistics of Venezuela, the municipality has a population of 9,454. The town of Macapo is the shire town of the Lima Blanco Municipality.

== Demographics ==
The Lima Blanco Municipality, according to a 2007 population estimate by the National Institute of Statistics of Venezuela, had a population of 9,161 (up from 7,965 in 2000). This amounted to 3.1% of the state's population. The municipality's population density is 72.13 inhabitants per square kilometre (186.8/sq mi).

== Government ==
The mayor of the Lima Blanco Municipality is José Orangel Sánchez Fernández, elected on October 31, 2004, with 36% of the vote. He replaced Moraima Machado shortly after the elections. The municipality is divided into two parishes; Macapo and La Aguadita (previous to December 30, 1994, the Lima Blanco Municipality contained only a single parish).
