= Cojedes, Cojedes =

Cojedes
- Location in Venezuela
- Coordinates: 9°37′N 68°55′W
- Country: Venezuela
- State: Cojedes
- Municipality: Anzoátegui

Government
  - Mayor: Víctor Gil Blanco (VVC)

Population (2001)
  - Total: 14,044
- Time zone: UTC-4:30 (VST)
  - Summer (DST): UTC-4:30 (not observed)
- Area code: 0258
- Website: anzoategui-cojedes.gob.ve
- The area and population figures are for the municipality

Cojedes (Spanish pronunciation: [koˈxeðes]) is a town in the Venezuelan state of Cojedes. This town is the shire town of the Anzoátegui Municipality and, according to the 2001 Venezuelan census, the municipality has a population of 14,044.

== Demographics ==
The Anzoátegui Municipality, according to the 2001 Venezuelan census, has a population of 14,044 (up from 11,106 in 1990). This amounts to 5.5% of Cojedes's population.

== Government ==
Cojedes is the shire town of the Anzoátegui Municipality in Cojedes. The mayor of the Anzoátegui Municipality is Luis Linares, reelected in 2004 with 44% of the vote. The last municipal election was held in October 2004.

== Notable people ==
Ivian Sarcos, a beauty queen who won the Miss World 2011 and Miss World Venezuela 2010 titles, is a native of Cojedes.

== See also ==
- List of cities and towns in Venezuela
