= Girardot Municipality, Cojedes =

Girardot Municipality Municipio Girardot
- Municipality
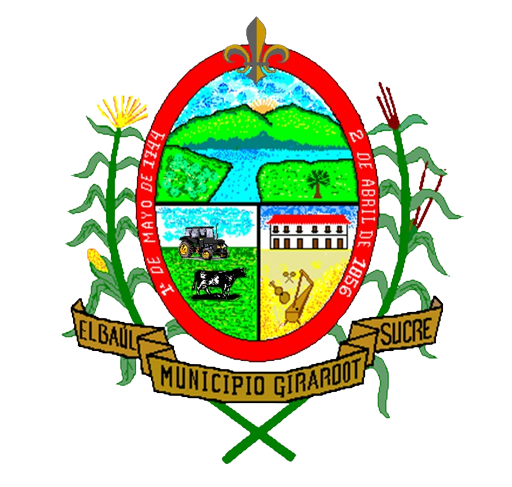
- Coat of arms

- Location in Cojedes

- Location in Venezuela
- Coordinates: 8°49′36″N 68°20′36″W
- Country: Venezuela
- State: Cojedes
- Municipal seat: El Baúl[*]

Government
  - Mayor: Gustavo Guillén Brizuela (MUD)

Area
  - Total: 2,982.6 km^{2} (1,151.6 sq mi)

Population (2011)
  - Total: 11,906
  - Density: 3.9918/km^{2} (10.339/sq mi)
- Time zone: UTC−4 (VET)
- Area code(s): 0258

The Girardot Municipality is one of the nine municipalities (municipios) that makes up the Venezuelan state of Cojedes and, according to the 2011 census by the National Institute of Statistics of Venezuela, the municipality has a population of 11,906. The town of El Baúl is the municipal seat of the Girardot Municipality.

== Demographics ==
The Girardot Municipality, according to a 2007 population estimate by the National Institute of Statistics of Venezuela, has a population of 11,579 (up from 10,387 in 2000). This amounts to 3.8% of the state's population. The municipality's population density is 3.34 inhabitants per square kilometre (8.7/sq mi).

== Government ==
The mayor of the Girardot Municipality is Gustavo Ramón Guillén Brizuela, re-elected on October 31, 2004, with 30% of the vote. The municipality is divided into two parishes; El Baúl and Sucre.
