= Tinaquillo Municipality =

Tinaquillo Municipality Municipio Tinaquillo
- Municipality
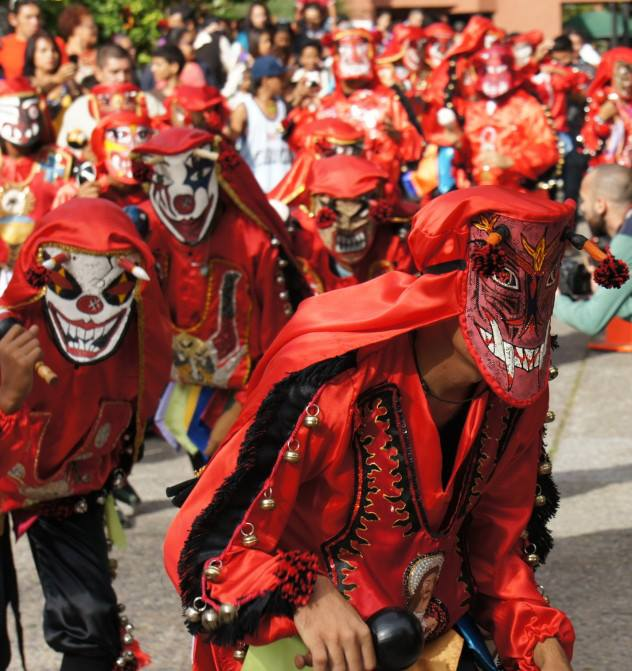

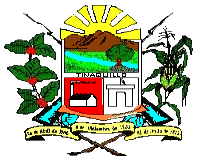
- Flag Coat of arms

- Location in Cojedes

- Location in Venezuela
- Coordinates: 9°54′34″N 68°17′52″W
- Country: Venezuela
- State: Cojedes
- Municipal seat: Tinaquillo

Government
  - Mayor: Lizardo Rojas Feo (VVC)

Area
  - Total: 684.6 km^{2} (264.3 sq mi)

Population (2011)
  - Total: 97,687
  - Density: 142.7/km^{2} (369.6/sq mi)
- Time zone: UTC−4 (VET)
- Area code(s): 0258
- Website: Official website

The Tinaquillo Municipality (was known as Falcón Municipality before 2011) is one of the nine municipalities (municipios) that makes up the Venezuelan state of Cojedes and, according to a according to the 2011 census by the National Institute of Statistics of Venezuela, the municipality has a population of 97.687. The town of Tinaquillo is the municipal seat of the Tinaquillo Municipality.

== Demographics ==
The Tinaquillo Municipality, according to a 2007 population estimate by the National Institute of Statistics of Venezuela, has a population of 90,773 (up from 74,872 in 2000). This amounts to 30.2% of the state's population. The municipality's population density is 127.13 inhabitants per square kilometre (329.3/sq mi).

== Government ==
The mayor of the Tinaquillo Municipality is José Gonzalo Mujica Herrera, elected on October 31, 2004 with 42% of the vote. He replaced Dimas Ramos shortly after the elections. The municipality is divided into one parish; Tinaquillo.
