= Cojedes (state) =

- State
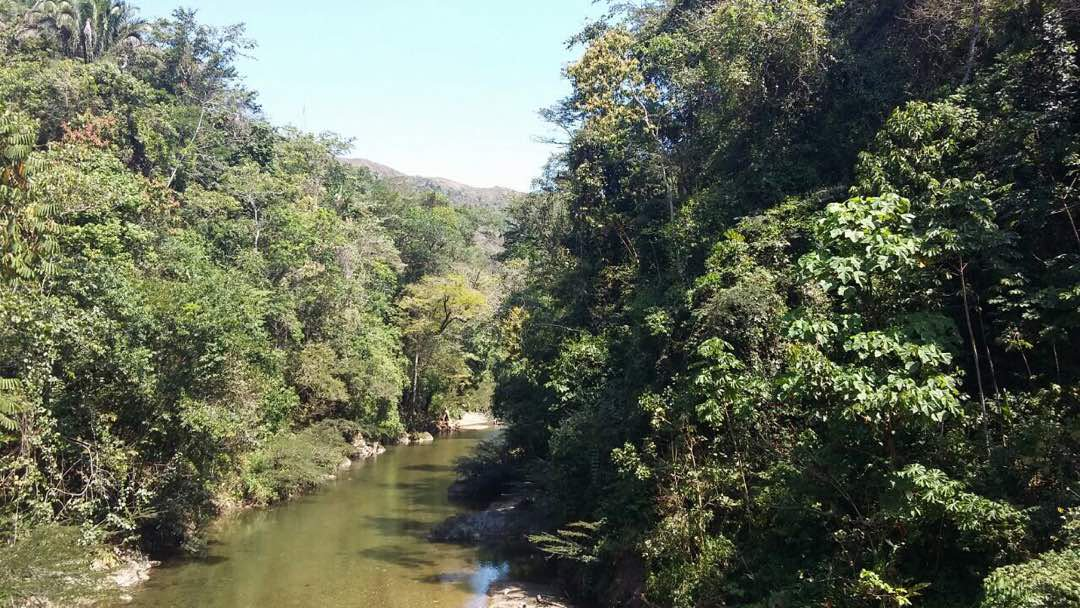
- Tirgua National Park

- Flag Coat of arms
- Motto: Ad sum English: I am here
- Anthem: Himno del Estado Cojedes
- Location within Venezuela
- Coordinates: 9.36°N 68.32°W
- Country: Venezuela
- Created: 1864
- Capital: San Carlos

Government
  - Body: Legislative Council
  - Governor: Alberto Galíndez

Area
  - Total: 14,800 km^{2} (5,700 sq mi)
  - Rank: 13th
- 1.62% of Venezuela

Population (2011 census)
  - Total: 323,165
  - Rank: 22nd
- 1.14% of Venezuela
- Time zone: UTC−4 (VET)
- ISO 3166 code: VE-H
- Emblematic tree: Apamate (Tabebuia rosea)
- HDI (2019): 0.688 medium · 17th of 24
- Website: www.cojedes.gob.ve

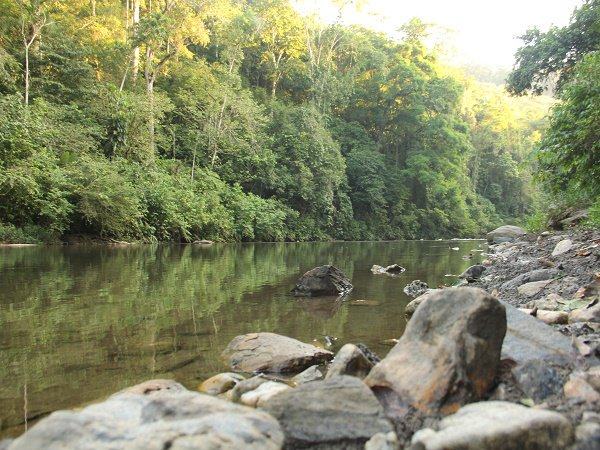
Tirgua National Park

Cojedes State (Spanish: Estado Cojedes, IPA: [esˈtaðo koˈxeðes]) is one of the 23 states of Venezuela. Located in the Central Region of Venezuela, its capital is San Carlos.

Cojedes State covers a total surface area of 14,800 km^{2} (5,700 sq mi) and, in 2011, had a census population of 323,165.

== Etymology ==
The name Cojedes, has its origin in the Cariban languages, which means: people of ceramics or people of ceramists. Name that also possesses one of the most important rivers of this federal entity of the plain, (Cojedes River) The same river that is born with the name of Rio Turbio; it passes through Barquisimeto and rises in the northern slope of the Portuguesa mountain range; when it reaches the plain of Barquisimeto it receives the flow of Rio Claro and so goes until it enters the territory of Cojedes, where it is joined by the Tucuragua and the Nirgua.

== History ==
=== Spanish colonization of Cojedes ===
The historical background of the state dates back to the mid-18th century. The city of San Carlos was founded in 1760 by the missionaries Fray Gabriel de San Lucas and Fray Salvador de Cadiz, with the name of San Carlos de Austria. By Royal Decree, dated in San Lorenzo de El Escorial, on September 28, 1676, King Charles II of Spain approved the formation of "Towns of Spaniards for the protection of Indians", ordering "that near the populated Missions and that from now on "Towns of Spaniards" be populated and founded up to 30 or 40 neighbours, of good life and example to serve to restrain in their escapes, to hold in their drunkenness and to suppress in their riots the Indians, and to accompany the said Spaniards to the missionaries for the reduction of the Gentile Indians".

By that same Royal Decree, the Missionaries of the Province of Caracas were granted the pertinent attributions to found a Spanish village on the banks of the Tirgua River, which would serve as a permanent seat and refuge for the Indians who were gathered in the Missions and nearby towns, with the aim of imposing them in community life.

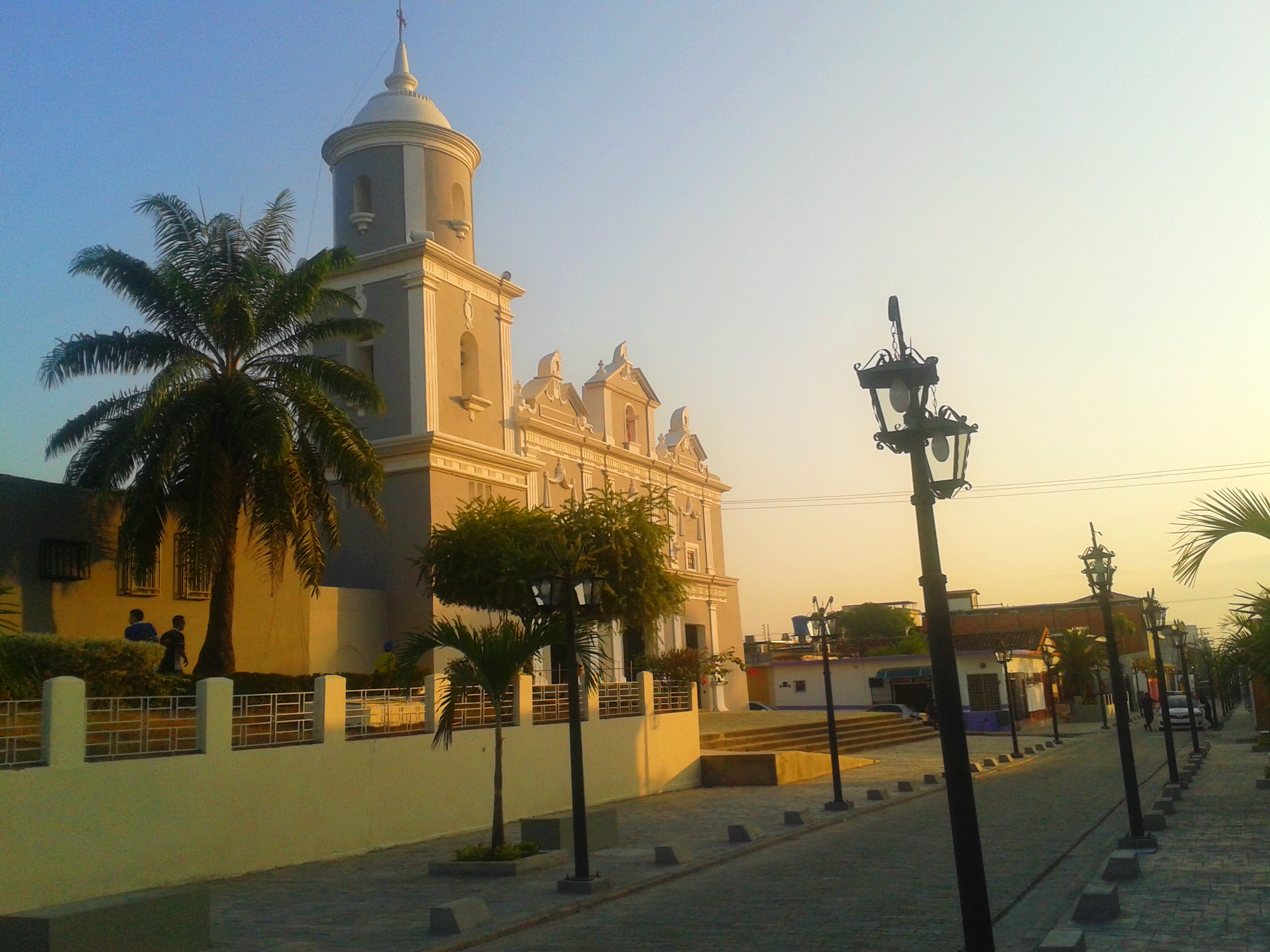
Church of St. John the Baptist in San Carlos, Cojedes

By virtue of this order, the Capuchin friar Pedro de Berja, founded on June 7, 1678, the city of "San Carlos de Austria", on the banks of the Tirgua River, near the Indian village of San Francisco, "with a lot of work to be done because this region was very depopulated, since from Valencia to Barquisimeto it was calculated 60 leagues and 70 from Valencia to Guanare, and the whole territory was deserted".

Other important towns founded by that time were El Pao (1661); Nuestra Señora de la Chiquinquirá de El Tinaco, founded by Fray Pablo de Orichuela (1760); Santa Clara de Caramacate, by Fray Cirilo Bautista de Sevilla (1750), which were under the jurisdiction and administration of the Province of Caracas, with the category of Cantons.

=== 19th century ===
The current territory of Cojedes was part of the province of Carabobo until March 3, 1855, when the Legislative Assembly created the province of Cojedes with capital in San Carlos, with the cantons of San Carlos, Tinaco and Pao.

The assassination of General Ezequiel Zamora, on January 10, 1860, occurred in front of the San Juan Church, where a stray bullet took his life. Around this fact there is a file of official documents that rest in the Miraflores Historical Archive under the title "The Historical Truth about the death and burial of General Ezequiel Zamora" prepared personally by the then Provisional President of Venezuela, General Cipriano Castro, who dedicated it to the National Academy of History (1904). The story of General Castro is accompanied by a series of testimonies of people who even accompanied General Zamora at the time of his death and later in the various burials.

On March 28, 1864, Cojedes ceased to be a province and became one of the founding states of the United States of Venezuela, to comply with the provisions of the federal Constitution in force for that year.6 In 1866 it merged with Carabobo into a single territorial entity, thus lasting until 1872 when they separated again.

In 1879, it became part of the State of the South, which also included Carabobo, Portuguesa, Zamora and the Nirgua department of the State of Yaracuy.

=== 20th century ===
In 1901 it regained its statehood, however this was lost in 1904 when it became part of the state of Zamora, until August 4, 1909, when it acquired its autonomy again. In 1989 the first direct universal and secret regional elections for governor were held and the then called Cojedes State Legislative Assembly.

== Geography ==
Cojedes State is located in the central-western part of the country and owes its name to the river of the same name, which means "where everything happens". It has a territorial extension of 14,800 square kilometers, which represents 1.62% of the national territory. It is the fifteenth largest in the country. Its climate is warm.

It belongs to the geographical system of the Central Plains together with the state of Guárico.

=== Vegetation ===
It is made up of large extensions of plains populated by forests and savannahs that dominate the landscape, where there are also extensive herds of cattle, one of the main economic resources of the state.

The regional tree is the apamate, which is one of the most beautiful, useful and most cultivated trees of the Venezuelan flora. In some regions of the country it is also known as "roble colorado" (Zulia) and "orumo" (Falcón). This tree can measure up to 30 m and its habitat is the deciduous forest.

The state of Cojedes borders on the following states:

- To the north with the states Yaracuy, Carabobo and Lara.
- To the east with the State of Guarico.
- To the south with the State of Barinas.
- To the west with the states of Portuguesa and Lara

=== Flora ===
It is made up of the relevant natural attractions such as deciduous and semi-deciduous forests. There are clusiaceae, mimosaceae, myrtaceae and tiliaceae in the tree stratum. On the other hand, the palm occupies large extensions of the understory.

=== Fauna ===
Among the mammals that can be found in the territory of the state are the howler and capuchin monkeys, the cunaguaro, the jaguar and the tapir. Snakes such as boa, rattlesnake, and coral, among others, can be found. You can also find birds such as the scarlet macaw (Ara macao), several species of parakeets and parrots, herons, pigeons, doves, and more.

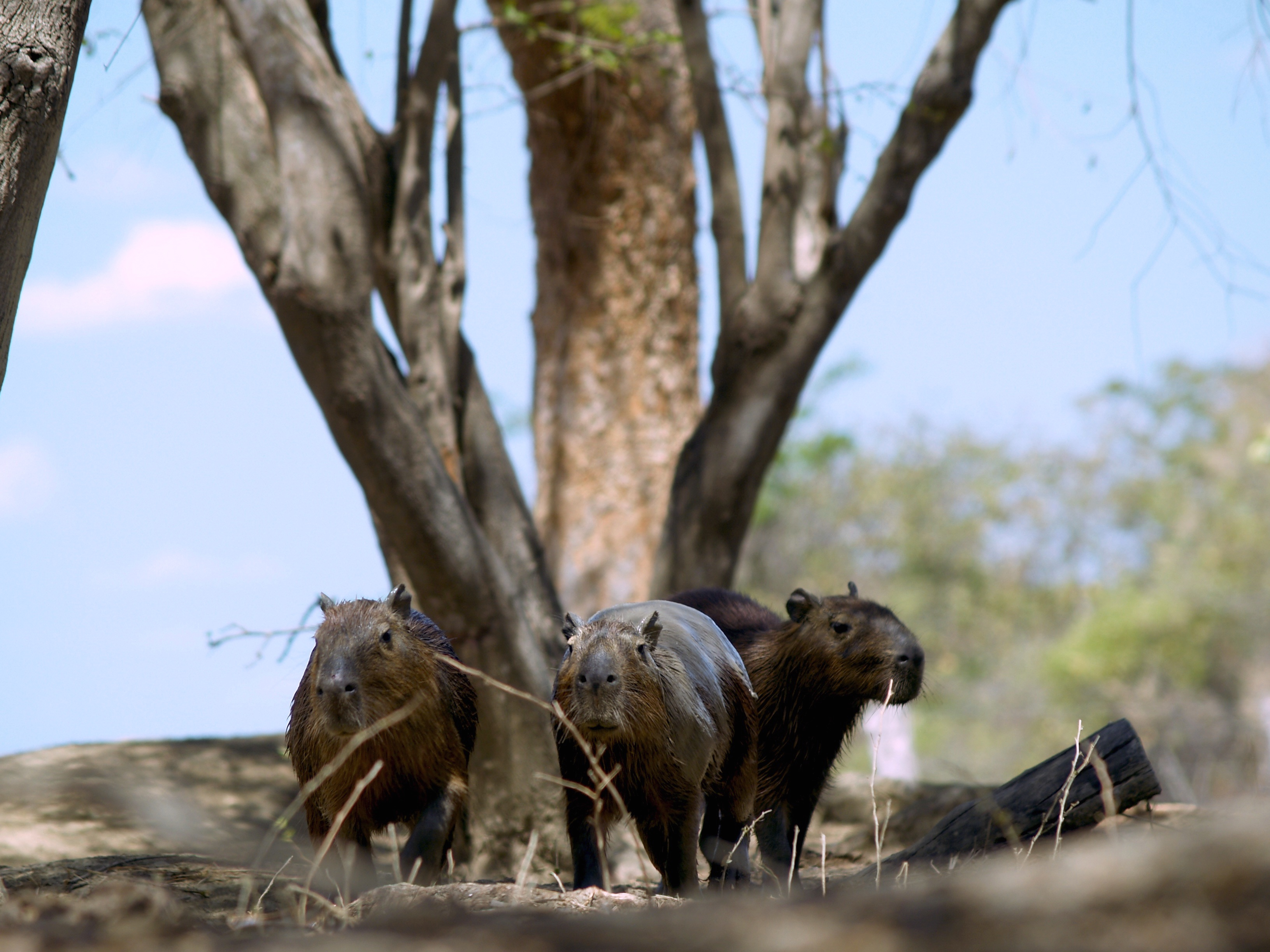
Family of Chigüires or Capybaras in the State of Cojedes

=== Hydrography ===
The state of Cojedes has important water sources, such as the Pao dam, located in the Pao municipality, which has more than 1,500 hectares and supplies water to the states of Aragua and Carabobo. But important rivers also flow in this plain entity.

=== Main Rivers ===
- Cojedes River, with 340 km, tributary of the Portuguesa, and the Pao.
- San Carlos River.
- Tirgua River
- Tinaco River.
- Macapo River.
- Tamanaco River.
- Among others.

=== Climate ===
Average annual temperature 26-28 °C. The region has a tropical climate. Compared to winter, summers have much more rain. According to Köppen and Geiger climate is classified as Aw.

=== Precipitations ===
Like the rest of the country, it does not have four seasons but two periods of rain and drought. Average annual rainfall: 1 400 mm

- Rainy Period: May to October
- Dry Period: November to April

=== Physiography ===
The state can be subdivided into 4 zones: a) Mountains b) Piedmont c) Middle Plains d) Lowlands

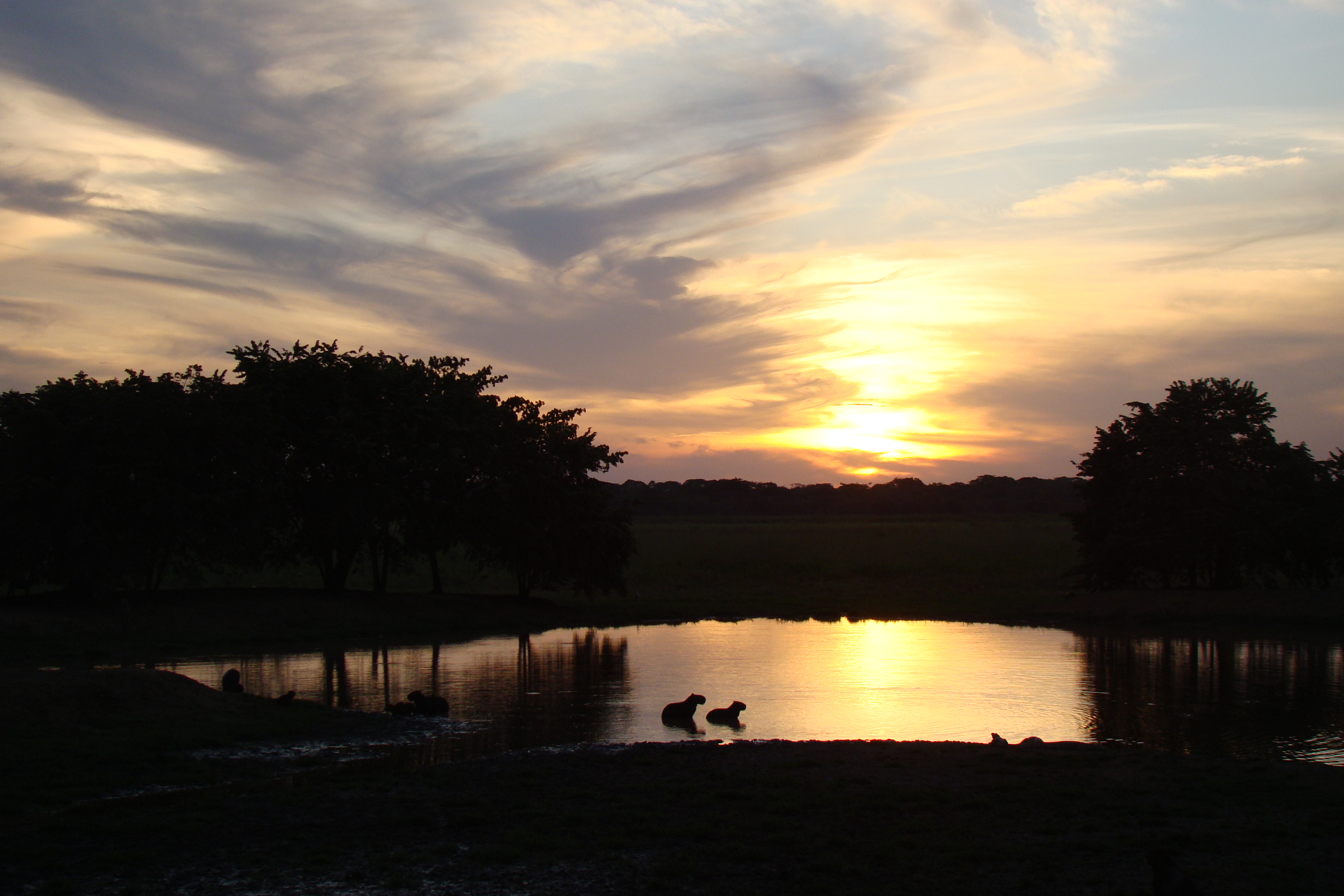
Hato Piñero, Girardot Municipality, Cojedes

== Politics and government ==
This state is autonomous and equal in political terms, it organizes its administration and public powers through a Constitution of the Cojedes State, dictated by the Legislative Council.

=== Executive power ===
It is composed of the Governor of Cojedes State and a group of State Secretaries who are appointed by him to assist him in the management of the government. The Governor is elected by the people by direct and secret vote for a period of four years and with the possibility of being re-elected continuously, being in charge of the state administration. The current governor is Margaud Godoy of the PSUV.

Like the other 23 federal entities of Venezuela, the State maintains its own police force, which is supported and complemented by the National Police and the Venezuelan National Guard.

=== Legislative power ===
The state legislature is the responsibility of the Legislative Council of the State of Cojedes, a unicameral body, elected by the people through direct and secret vote every four years, and may be re-elected for two consecutive periods, under a system of proportional representation of the population of the state and its municipalities. The state of Cojedes has 9 deputies.

== Municipalities and municipal seats ==
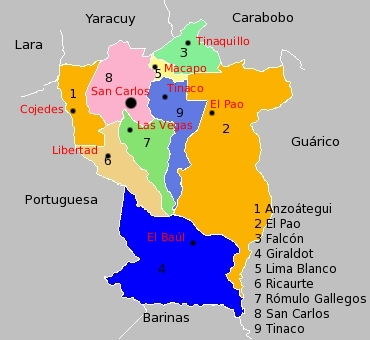

1. Anzoátegui (Cojedes)
2. Tinaquillo (Tinaquillo)
3. Girardot (El Baúl)
4. Lima Blanco (Macapo)
5. Pao de San Juan Bautista (El Pao)
6. Ricaurte (Libertad)
7. Rómulo Gallegos (Las Vegas)
8. Ezequiel Zamora (San Carlos)
9. Tinaco (Tinaco)

== Economy ==
The economic base of the entity is oriented to extensive cattle raising. The livestock sector is dominated by cattle and pig farming. One fifth of the territory of Lugo is grazed by herds of different types. For centuries, livestock was the only alternative for occupying the space. The economy is completed by the production of milk, cheese, rice, tobacco, sesame, cotton, corn, yucca and forestry.

Its wood production is based on the irrational extraction of fine species, ultimately oriented to hard and soft woods. The industry, in constant expansion, produces spare parts for motors, electrical material, textile yarns and furniture among other products.

According to the MAC 89/91 Agricultural Statistical Yearbook, the main products grown in the state are: corn, yam, sorghum, quinchoncho, cassava, mango and other fruits. In the livestock sector, cattle and pig farming dominate with 502,690 and 166,242 units respectively, and 1,358,811 poultry.

Lumber production, initially based on the irrational extraction of fine species, has lately been oriented towards the so-called hard and soft woods, diminishing the productive capacity of the forests.

=== Main products ===
- Agricultural: Cattle, milk, rice, tobacco, sesame, cotton, corn, yucca, wood, Rice, sugar cane, coffee, yam, sorghum and cassava.
- Industrial: Automotive parts, yarn, furniture, electrical materials.
- Breeding: Poultry, cattle, goats and pigs.
- Fishing: Poor white, striped catfish, cajaro, coporo, palometa, sierra, tongo, among others.

== Demographics ==
Historical population
Year	Pop.	±% p.a.
1873	85,678	—
1881	83,792	−0.28%
1891	87,935	+0.48%
1920	81,850	−0.25%
1926	82,152	+0.06%
1936	48,091	−5.21%
1941	49,769	+0.69%
1950	52,111	+0.51%
1961	72,652	+3.07%
1971	94,351	+2.65%
1981	133,991	+3.57%
1990	182,066	+3.47%
2001	253,105	+3.04%
2011	323,165	+2.47%
Source: "XIV CENSO NACIONAL DE POBLACIÓN Y VIVIENDA - Resultados por Entidad Federal y Municipio del Estado Cojedes" (PDF). Instituto Nacional de Estadística.

=== Race and ethnicity ===
According to the 2011 Census, the racial composition of the population was:

Racial composition	Population	%
Mestizo	—N/a	59.2
White	115,437	35.6
Black	13,619	4.2
Other race	—N/a	1.0

== Tourism ==
The colonial architecture and the landscapes of the plains stand out in the region, ideal for observing country animals or local species in their natural habitat.

=== Outstanding buildings ===
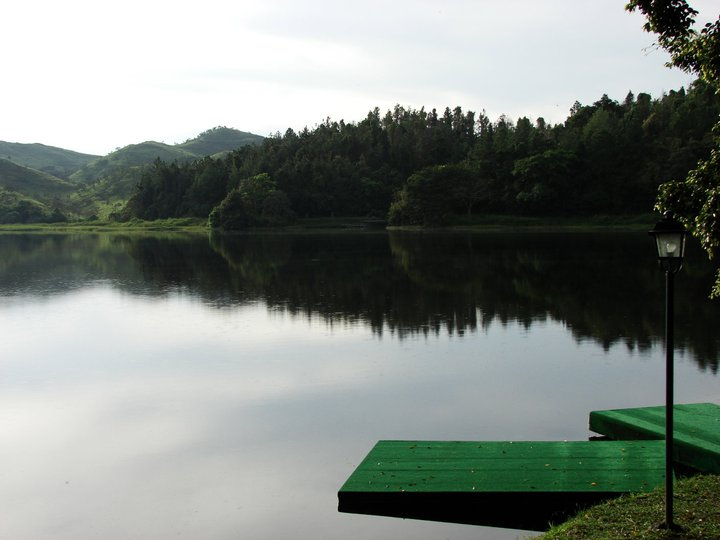
Lagunazo tourist camp in Tinaquillo, Cojedes

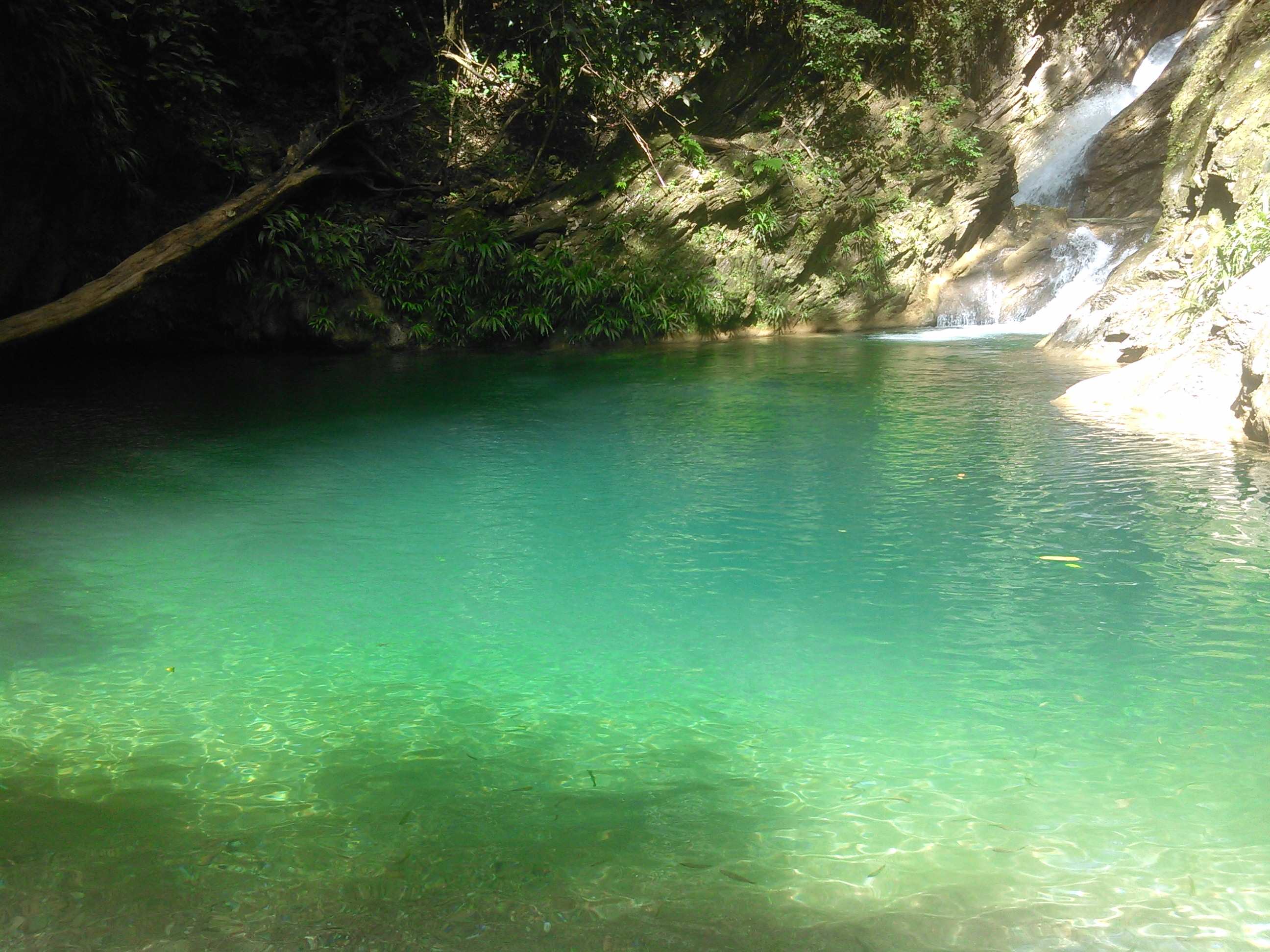
Pozo Azul

- La Blanquera House-Museum.
- Church of the Immaculate Conception (Cathedral of San Carlos).
- Church of Our Lady of Help of Tinaquillo
- Ruins of the Beaterio or El Pao School of Education.
- Monument of the Divine Shepherdess, Patroness of the State in the Redoma de Libertad Municipality Ricaurte.
- Divine Shepherdess Sanctuary in Libertad de Cojedes.
- The San Carlos racetrack.
- Monument to the Mango of San Carlos
- "Paula Correa Rodríguez" National Reference Laboratory located in the municipality of Tinaco, is the first phytosanitary and zoosanitary diagnostic laboratory in South America with national and international reference.

=== Natural Heritage ===
- San Carlos river mouth
- Thermal waters the Aguadita.
- Thermal Waters Las Galeras de El Pao
- Boca Toma Spa.
- Hato Piñero.
- General Manuel Manrique National Park.

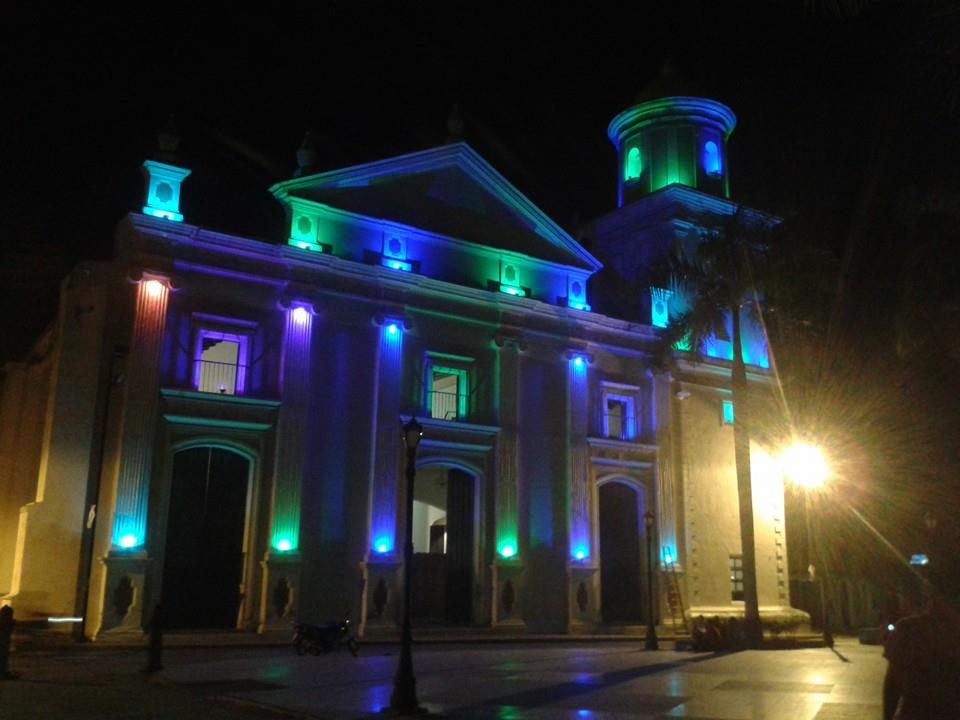
San Carlos Cathedral

== Culture ==
=== Traditions ===
- San Pascual Bailón, who defines himself as the Patron of Cojedes' Freedom. It is celebrated on May 17 every year.
- Patron Saint's Day of the Divine Shepherdess, Patron Saint of Cojedes, with the appearance of the Jobal, town of Libertad de Cojedes. It is celebrated on September 8 every year.
- Toros Coleados: It is a common pastime on Sundays and holidays. The stage is a sleeve of one hundred or more meters long by about ten meters wide, closed by a fence. The riders compete to grab the tail of the bull in order to knock it down or "tail it".
- Mango Fair .
- Cock fights: They take place in a small circular amphitheatre, usually rustic, with a palm or zinc roof. One bets by the roosters and one gives to beginning to the weight of the roosters and the control of the spurs. A fighting judge makes decisions according to the established rules.
- Devil Dancers of Tinaquillo and San Juan in San Carlos. It is celebrated on December 28 every year. It is celebrated in the town of Tinaquillo. Its costume consists of a red monkey and a black cape that reaches the waist, in addition to the mask.
- Locainas, celebrated for the Day of the Holy Innocents, or as they commonly call it, day of the madmen.
- Feast of San Isidro Labrador, patron of the municipality Lima Blanco celebrated on May 15

=== Handicrafts ===
It is characterized by the manufacture of musical instruments: harp, cuatro and maracas, mainly in El Baúl and Tinaquillo. Towards the northern part of the state, in the town of La Sierra, tin violins are made, and hammocks and

From leather you get ropes, straps, saddles. There are espadrille factories.

The peasant also works the wood to produce canoes for navigation, rafts, etc.

The plumages (bracelets and earrings) and Yanomami ornaments, the Arawak group ornaments and the masks and ornaments of the piaroas, are the most difficult pieces to obtain and therefore have a unique value.

=== Gastronomy ===
As it is a plain state, it is common to consume meat from hunting such as: deer, capybara (chigüire), paca (lapa), etc.; as well as river fish such as morocoto, striped catfish, etc. However, the most typical dish of this state is usually the so-called "altered" pabellón criollo, which consists of replacing the traditional white rice in the dish with spaghetti and may or may not be topped with a fried egg.

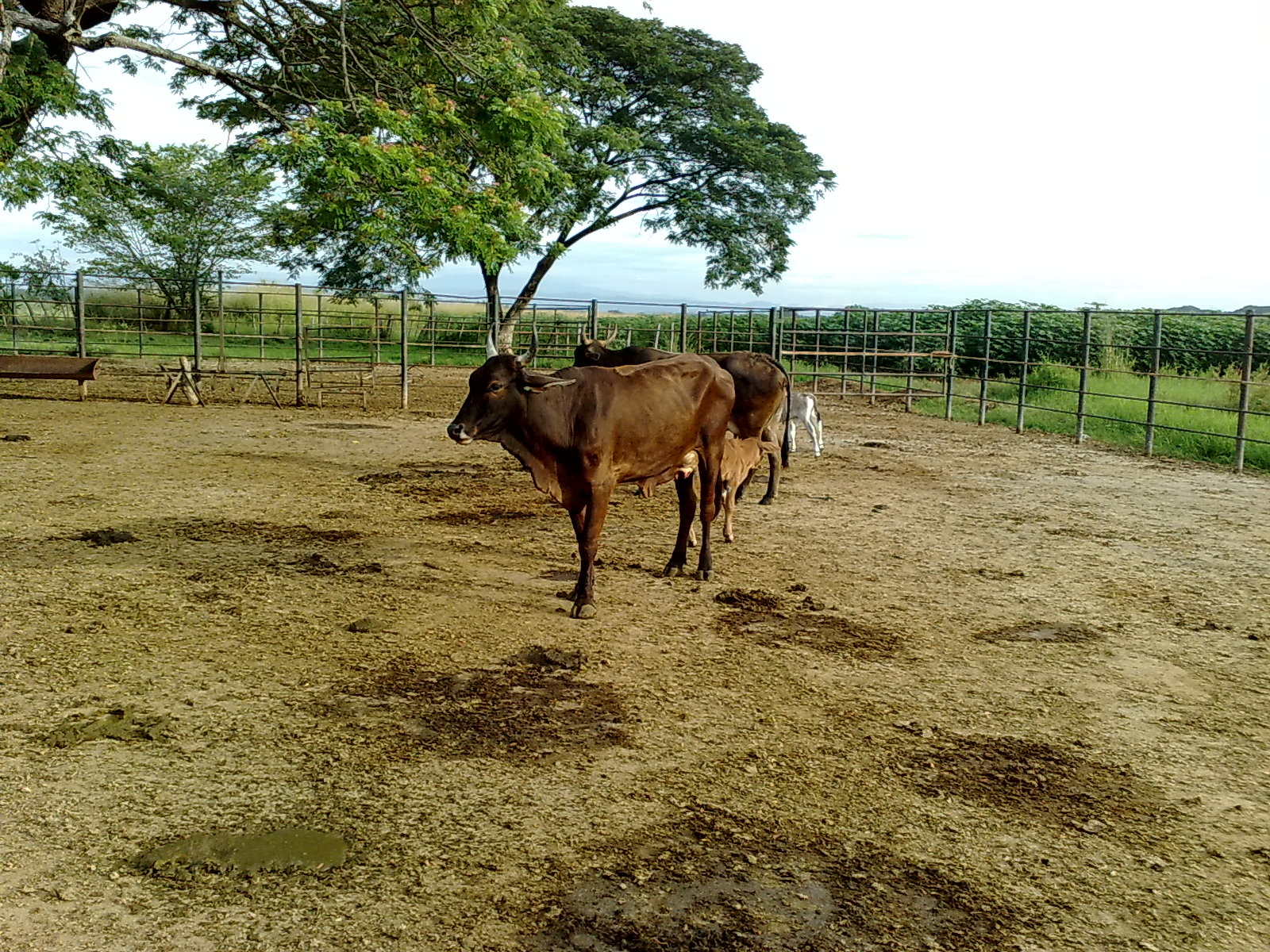
Cattle in Cojedes

other local dishes include

- Morrocoy cake.
- Boiled river fish.
- Creole grill.
- Guarapita: liquor with fruit juice and sugar.
- Chigüire mechado: a capybara with tapiramo and rice.
- Tostón: cooked green banana.
- Majarete: a base of corn and coconut.
- Buñuelo: yucca dessert accompanied by honey.
- Pan de tunja: wheat flour cake.
- Biscochuelo: flour and egg bread wrapped in sugar.

== Sport ==
Various sports are practiced in the state, in 2003 the Universidad Iberoamericana del Deporte (now called Universidad deportiva del sur) was inaugurated. Among the facilities that can be found in Cojedes are

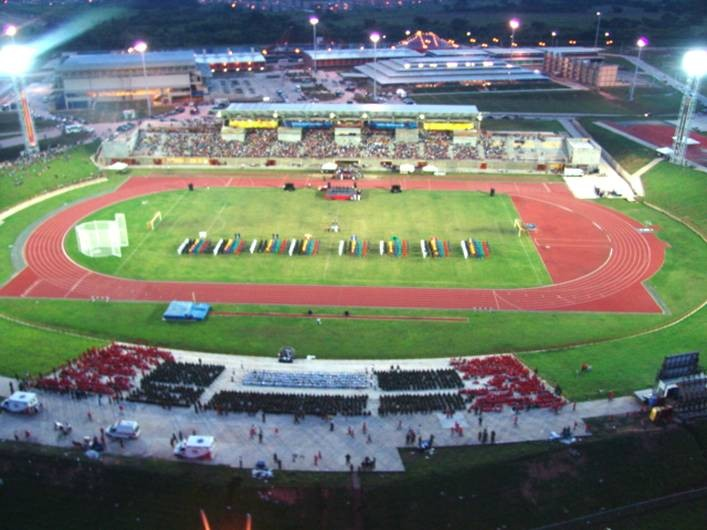
Football stadium in the Universidad deportiva del Sur, San Carlos, Cojedes

- Tulio Jose Lazo Stadium
- Alfonso Rios Stadium is usually used for baseball and softball practice.
- Gustavo "Patón" Martínez Stadium, Tinaquillo (Baseball)
- Guillermo Barreto Mendez Park
- Sports City Gymnasium (Basketball, Volleyball)
- "José Tadeo Monagas" Gymnasium of the Vencedores de Cojedes Sports Complex (volleyball, soccer among others)
- Manuel Manrique's indoor court, in the municipality of Ezequiel Zamora (indoor soccer)

== See also ==
- States of Venezuela
