= San Carlos, Cojedes =

San Carlos de Austria
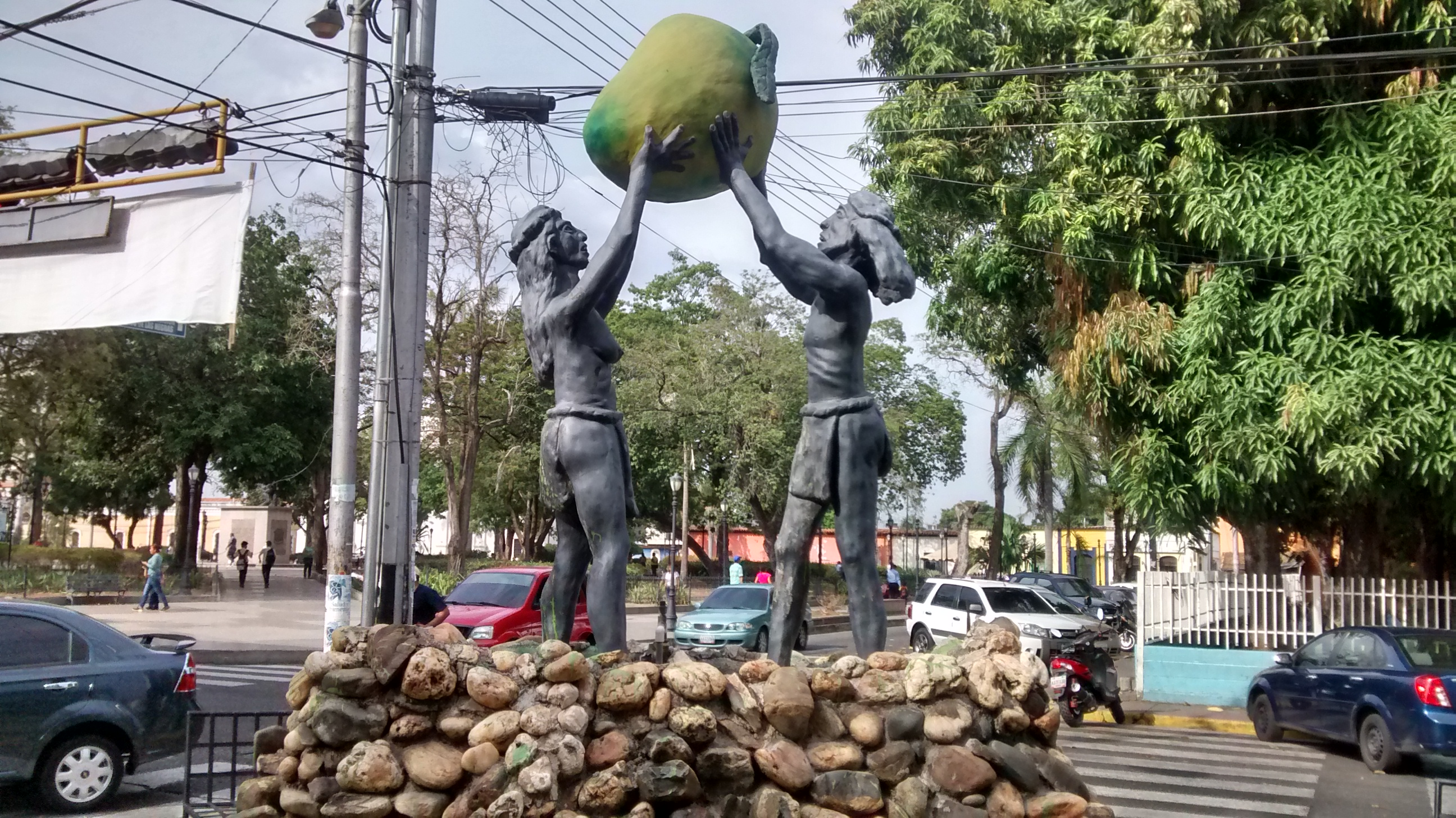
- Monument in Honor of the Indigenous People

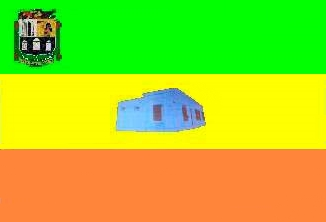
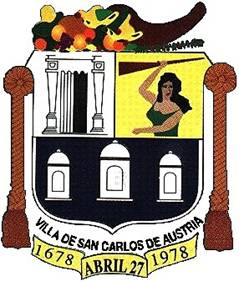
- Flag Coat of arms

- San Carlos Municipality in Cojedes State

- Location within Venezuela
- Coordinates: 09°39′0″N 68°35′0″W
- Country: Venezuela
- State: Cojedes
- Municipality: Ezequiel Zamora Municipality
- Founded: April 27, 1678

Government
  - Mayor: Luis Mireles Ruíz (MUD)
- Elevation: 152 m (499 ft)

Population (2001)
  - Total: 83,957
  - Demonym: sancarleño
- Time zone: UTC−4 (VST)
- Postal code: 2201
- Area code: 0258
- Climate: Aw
- Website: sancarlos-cojedes.gov.ve
- The area and population figures are for the municipality

San Carlos (Spanish pronunciation: [saŋ ˈkaɾlos]) is the capital of the Venezuelan state of Cojedes. This city is also the municipal seat of the Ezequiel Zamora Municipality and, according to the 2001 Venezuelan census, the municipality has a population of 83,957.

== History ==
Father Capuchino Fray Pedro de Berja founded the city of San Carlos de Austria on April 27, 1678.

== Demographics ==
The San Carlos Municipality, according to the 2001 Venezuelan census, has a population of 83,957 (up from 62,140 in 1990). This amounts to 33.2% of Cojedes's population.

== Government ==
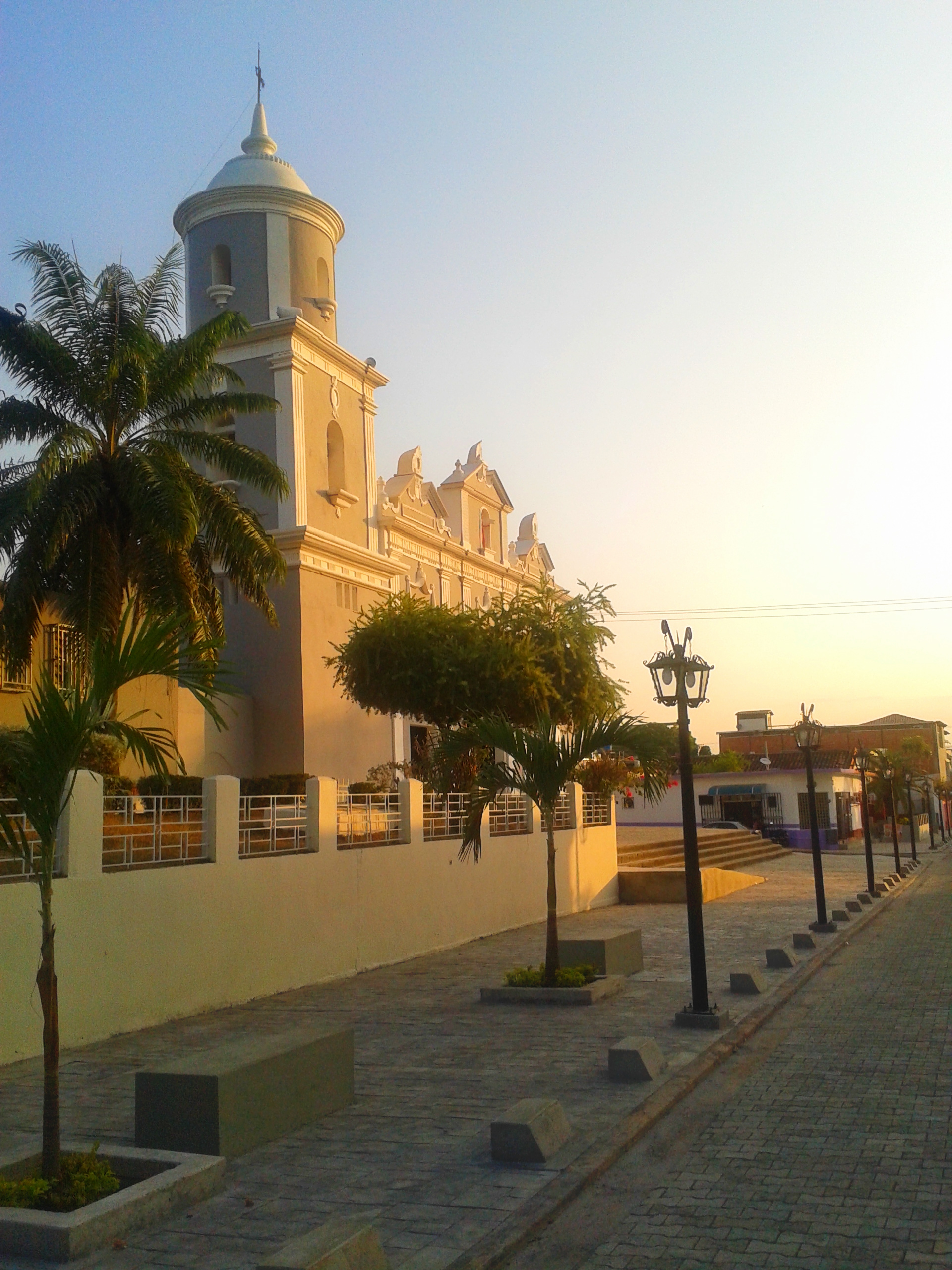
San Juan Bautista Church in San Carlos

San Carlos is the shire town of the San Carlos Municipality in Cojedes. The mayor of the San Carlos Municipality is Luis Alexander Mireles Ruiz. The last municipal election was held in July 2025.

== Sites of interest ==
=== Historical sites ===
- La Blanquera, a historical colonial-baroque style house founded by a wealthy family of Conquistadores in the 18th-century
- Catedral de San Carlos
- Iglesia Santo Domingo
- Iglesia San Juan Bautista

=== Squares and parks ===
- Plaza Bolívar

== See also ==
- List of cities and towns in Venezuela
