= Calabozo =

- City
- Villa de Todos los Santos de Calabozo
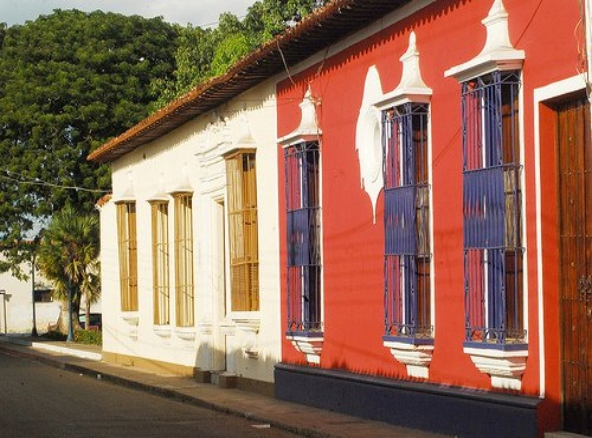
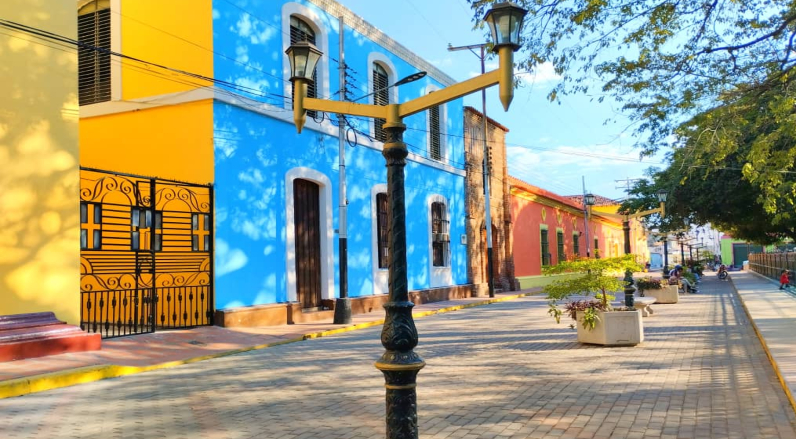
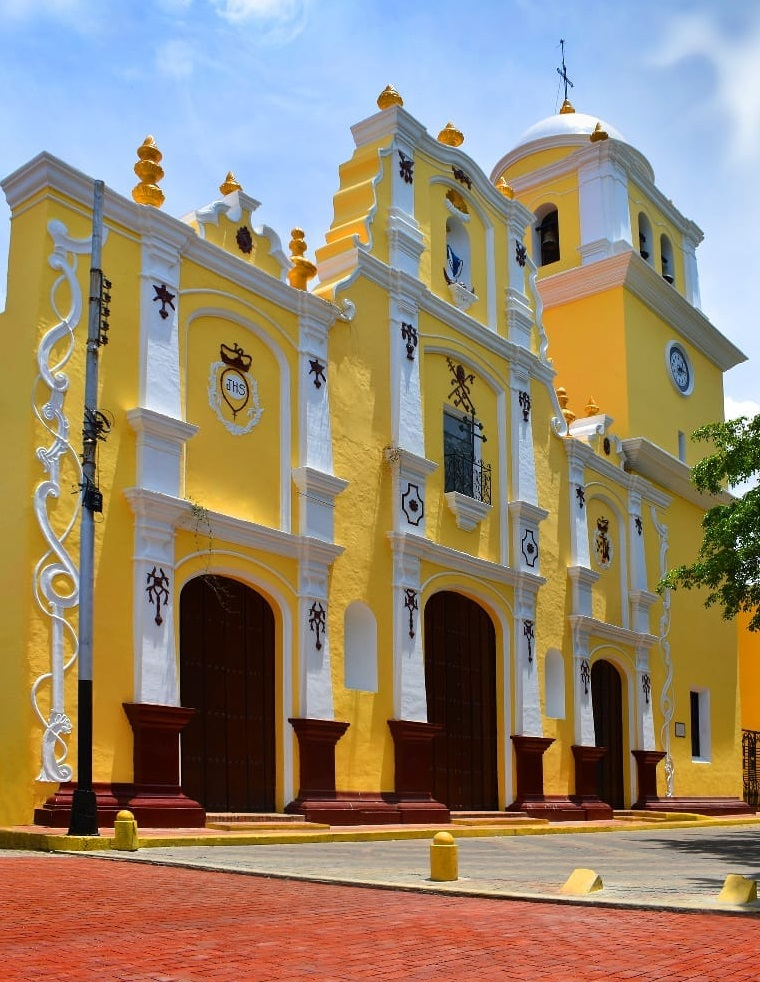
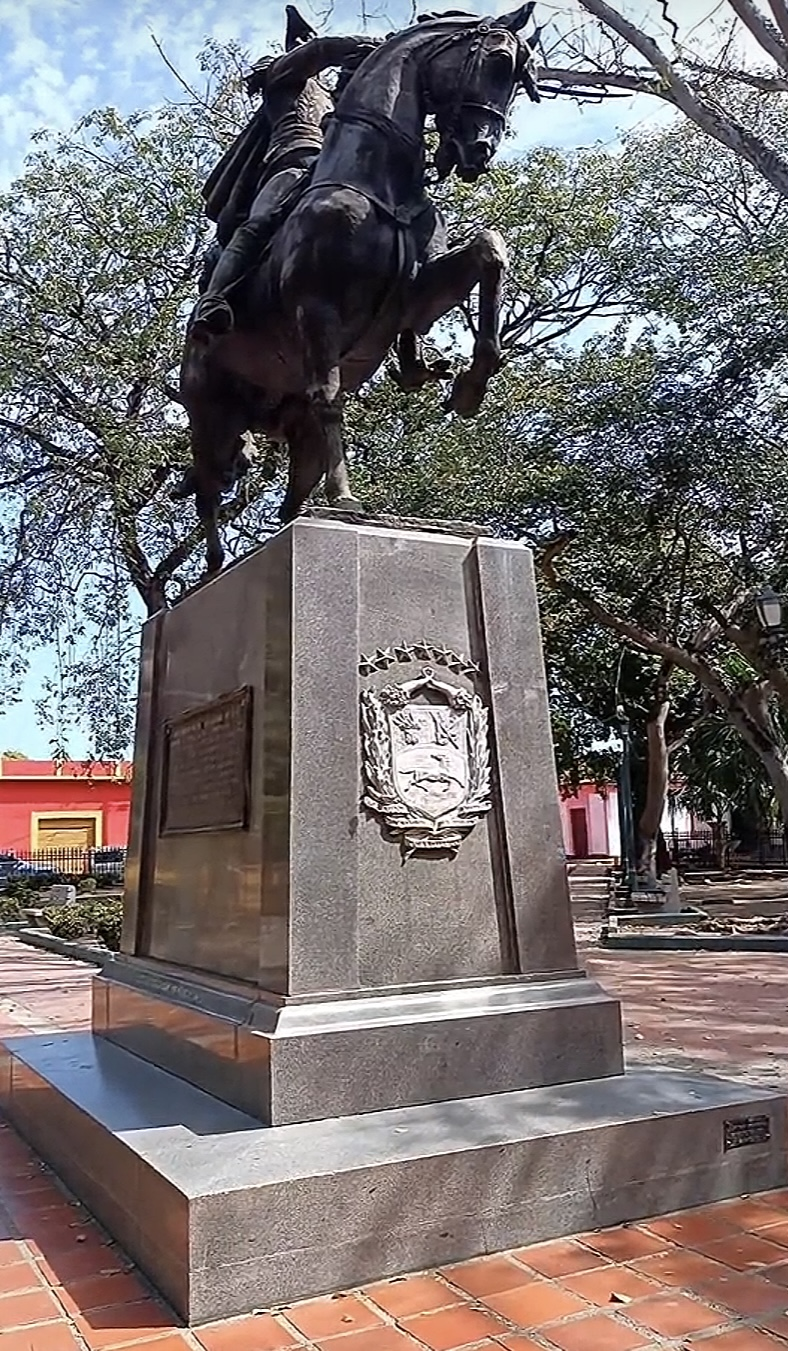
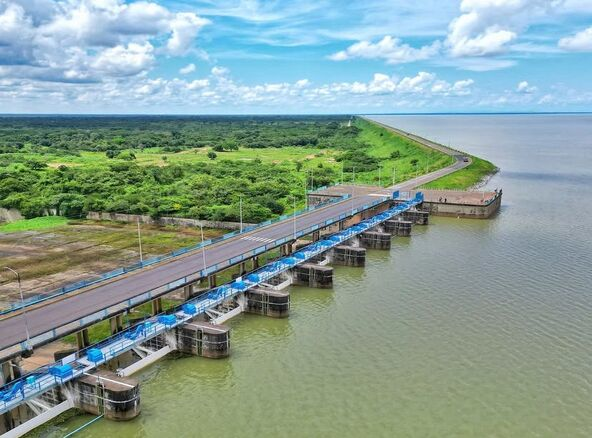
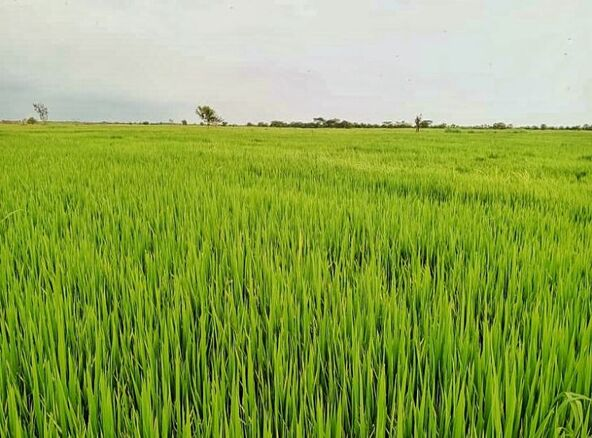
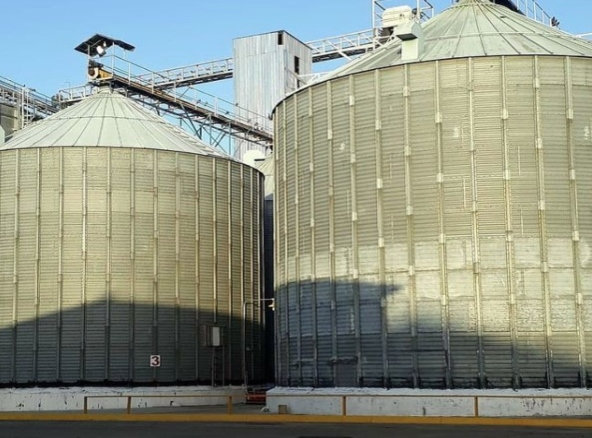
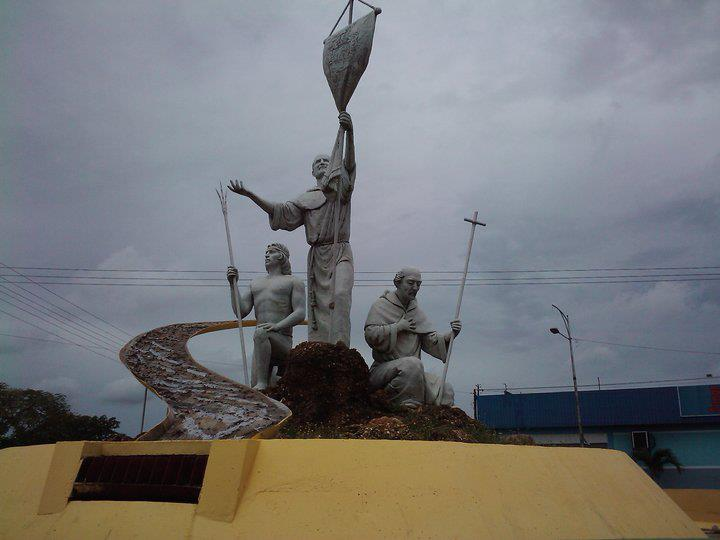
- From left to right and top to bottom: 1) Colonial architecture, 2) Typical street, 3) Catedral de Todos los Santos 4) Bolívar Square 5) Generoso Campilongo Dam 6) Rice fields, 7) Rice silos, 8) Founders' Monument

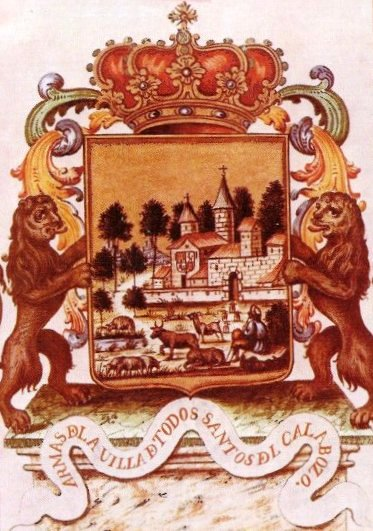
- Flag Coat of arms
- Nickname: The Agro-industrial Capital
- Location in Venezuela
- Coordinates: 8°56′N 67°26′W
- Country: Venezuela
- State: Guárico
- Municipality: Francisco de Miranda
- Founded: 1 February 1724
- Founder: Bartolomé de San Miguel and Fray Salvador de Cádiz

Government
  - Mayor: Janny Álvarez Mirabal (2025–2028)

Area
  - City: 51 km^{2} (20 sq mi)
- Elevation: 105 m (344 ft)

Population (2026 (projection))
  - City: 190,622
  - Density: 3,738/km^{2} (9,680/sq mi)
  - Urban: 94%
- Time zone: UTC−4 (VET)
- Postal code: 2312
- Area code: +58 246
- Climate: Aw

Calabozo, officially Villa de Todos los Santos de Calabozo, is a city in Venezuela located in the central Guárico state, in the Central Llanos region. It serves as the capital of the Francisco de Miranda Municipality and is the most populous urban center in Guárico, with a projected population of 190,622 inhabitants for 2026.

The city is situated on an extensive alluvial plain associated with the Guárico River basin, whose hydraulic development profoundly transformed the territory from the 1950s onward. The construction of the Guárico River Irrigation System and the Generoso Campilongo Dam enabled the conversion of extensive savanna areas into irrigated farmland, consolidating Calabozo as Venezuela's main rice production center and a nationally significant agro-industrial hub.

From a historical perspective, Calabozo has a unique urban trajectory within the Venezuelan Llanos. Its origins date back to the expansion of Capuchin missions during the 18th century and its consolidation as a Spanish town in 1724, with subsequent royal confirmation in 1774. During the colonial period, the town developed a livestock-based economy that made it a political and commercial center of the central plains. Later, Calabozo actively participated in the Venezuelan War of Independence and served as the first capital of Guárico state following its creation in 1848.

The city also holds a prominent place in Venezuela's scientific history. In 1800, it was visited by the German naturalist Alexander von Humboldt, who documented the electrical experiments of the self-taught inventor Carlos del Pozo y Sucre. Decades later, the German physician Carl Sachs conducted research in the region on the electric fish of the Llanos, the results of which were published in the journal Nature.

Calabozo's architectural heritage reflects the continuity between the colonial town and the contemporary city. The historic center, declared a Zone of Historical Value in 1979, preserves a collection of religious, civic, and domestic buildings from the 18th, 19th, and early 20th centuries, among which the Metropolitan Cathedral of All Saints stands out. The city's cultural identity is closely linked to Llanero traditions, livestock farming, agriculture, literature—especially the work of poet Francisco Lazo Martí—and Venezuelan music.

== Toponymy ==
The origin of the toponym "Calabozo" has not been definitively established and has given rise to various historical interpretations, none of which have conclusive documentary support.

The most widespread explanation in local tradition relates the name to the shape adopted by the Guárico River in the section surrounding the settlement. The curved course of the river was supposedly compared to the shape of an ancient agricultural instrument called a calabozo, a type of plow or farming tool. However, this theory lacks documentary verification.

Another interpretation, also popular, links the name to the existence of confinement sites for indigenous people during the early periods of conquest and colonization. This explanation, however, is not supported by available historical sources.

From an academic perspective, a possible indigenous origin for the toponym has been proposed, related to terms recorded in 18th-century missionary documentation. The existence of these different interpretations means that the definitive origin of the name remains subject to research into colonial documentation.

During the colonial period, the settlement received different denominations related to its formation process. References appear to the missionary towns of Santísima Trinidad de Calabozo and Nuestra Señora de los Ángeles de Calabozo, while the Spanish settlement was ultimately consolidated under the name Villa de Todos los Santos de Calabozo, confirmed by royal decree in 1774.

== History ==
=== Pre-Hispanic Background ===
The territory where Calabozo is located was part of the region occupied by various indigenous groups inhabiting the central Venezuelan Llanos before the arrival of Europeans. The indigenous peoples of this area maintained forms of social and economic organization adapted to the conditions of the savannas, gallery forests, and watercourses. The economy of these communities was based on hunting, fishing, gathering, and incipient agriculture, taking advantage of the flood periods of rivers for cultivation on alluvial lands.

Available information about these groups is limited, and current knowledge comes mainly from archaeological records and the chronicles of missionaries and travelers who explored the region from the 18th century onward.

=== Foundation and Colonial Period (1724–1810) ===
Calabozo's history is closely linked to the expansion of Andalusian Capuchin missions into the Venezuelan Llanos during the early decades of the 18th century. In this region, there were numerous indigenous communities maintaining different forms of territorial and economic organization, and the missionaries sought to concentrate them in reduction settlements to facilitate their evangelization and control.

In 1723, the Andalusian Capuchin missionaries Bartolomé de San Miguel and Fray Salvador de Cádiz organized missionary settlements near the territory where the Spanish town would later be consolidated. Historical documentation mentions the concentration of several indigenous groups from the banks of the Orinoco River and other areas of the Llanos: Guaiqueríes, Mapoyes, Tamanacos, Otomacos, Abaricotos, and Güires.

The establishment of the Spanish population was accompanied by conflicts related to land ownership and use. The interests of landowners established in the region, dedicated to cattle raising, came into conflict with the expansion of the new missionary settlements, generating controversies that lasted for decades.

On November 26, 1723, the provincial governor authorized, at the request of the missionaries, the creation of a Spanish town near the mission towns. The corresponding ecclesiastical authorization was granted later. On February 1, 1724, the founding act associated with the establishment of the town took place, with the raising and blessing of a cross at the site destined for the new settlement.

In 1726, the governor intervened again in the territorial organization of the town, ordering the distribution of plots among the residents and establishing lands for its sustenance. A royal decree of February 15, 1738, confirmed the foundation, while territorial controversies with the missions continued over the following decades. In 1751, the Council of the Indies recognized certain territorial rights for both the town and the missions of Santísima Trinidad and Nuestra Señora de los Ángeles. Finally, the title of town was confirmed by royal decree of April 20, 1774, formally consolidating the denomination of Villa de Todos los Santos de Calabozo.

During the second half of the 18th century, Calabozo became an important center for the livestock economy of the Llanos. The town's position, at the crossroads of routes connecting extensive cattle-raising territories, favored its role as a collection and marketing center for livestock products, especially cattle, mules, and horses. These products were marketed toward Caracas and other centers of the Captaincy General of Venezuela.

In 1776, the town's first council was organized, composed of ordinary mayors, brotherhood mayors, royal standard-bearer, chief constable, and council members, which consolidated its administrative status.

The pastoral visit of Bishop Mariano Martí in 1780 constitutes one of the most important sources for understanding the population's characteristics during the colonial period. According to the description made during that visit, Calabozo had approximately 428 houses and 3,448 inhabitants. Martí's visit was accompanied by the creation of a school, indicating the incipient development of educational institutions in the town.

=== Humboldt and Science in Calabozo (1800) ===
One of the most singular episodes in Calabozo's history occurred in 1800, when the German naturalist Alexander von Humboldt visited the city during his journey through the equinoctial regions of the New Continent. Humboldt, accompanied by the French botanist Aimé Bonpland, stayed several days in the area and recorded observations on the geography, population, economy, and natural conditions of the Llanos.

The aspect that most caught the naturalist's attention was the existence of scientific instruments built locally by Carlos del Pozo y Sucre, a Venezuelan inventor who had developed electrical devices without having received formal scientific training comparable to that of European centers. Humboldt documented these experiments and mentioned del Pozo in his work Journey to the Equinoctial Regions of the New Continent, giving him international projection.

This episode has been interpreted by historiography as an example of self-taught scientific capacity in colonial Venezuela and as a precedent for interest in electrical research in the country.

=== Venezuelan War of Independence (1810–1823) ===
On July 31, 1811, the local council expressed its adherence to the independence movement, in the context of Venezuela's declaration of independence. Calabozo's geographical position, in the center of the Llanos and at the crossroads of strategic routes, quickly made the city a disputed point during the Venezuelan War of Independence.

During the conflict, the city changed hands several times, being disputed by royalist and republican forces. José Tomás Boves, who had been confined in Calabozo since 1808, made the city one of his main centers of operations during the most violent phase of the war in the Llanos.

==== Battle of Calabozo (1818) ====
On February 12, 1818, during the Central Campaign, Simón Bolívar and José Antonio Páez led the patriot forces in a decisive action against the royalist army commanded by General Pablo Morillo.

The patriot army, composed of approximately 3,500 men, fell upon Calabozo, where the royalist army was concentrated. The cavalry commanded by José Antonio Páez defeated Morillo's forces, who evacuated Calabozo two days later and moved to El Sombrero. The battle had important strategic consequences for the independence campaign, although it was not decisive for the outcome of the war.

=== Republican Period (1830–1934) ===
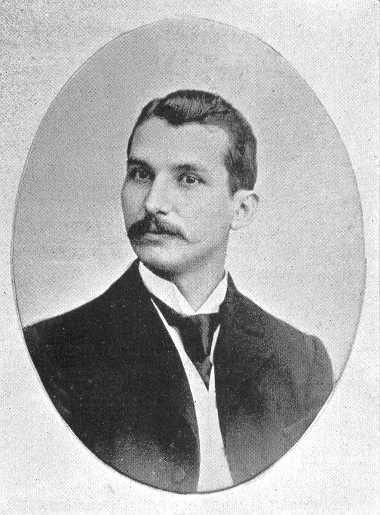
Francisco Lazo Martí, poet from Calabozo.

After independence, Calabozo retained its importance as an urban and economic center of the Llanos. In 1839, the National College of Calabozo was established, one of the first secondary education institutions in the region, and in 1842 the city had its first printing press.

On February 4, 1848, José Antonio Páez rose up in Calabozo against the government of José Gregorio Monagas, within the framework of the civil war. This episode reflects the persistence of political and military disputes that characterized 19th-century Venezuela and the strategic importance of the city as a stage for conflicts.

In 1863, the city became the seat of the homonymous bishopric, with Salustiano Crespo as its first bishop, which elevated its ecclesiastical status. In 1864, General Zoilo Medrano took Calabozo and established himself as the first president of Guárico state, in the context of the Federal War.

Between 1877 and 1878, the German physician Carl Sachs resided in the city and conducted studies on the Gymnotus electricus (electric eel or trembler), a species of electric fish characteristic of the Llanos. The results of his research were published in the scientific journal Nature.

Calabozo was the first capital of Guárico State in 1848, when the federal entity was created. However, in 1934, during the government of Juan Vicente Gómez, the capital was transferred to San Juan de los Morros, which meant a loss of political relevance for the city, although it did not affect its economic growth.

=== 20th Century and Present (1935–present) ===
In 1956, the Generoso Campilongo Dam was built, a hydraulic engineering work that transformed the local economy by allowing irrigation of extensive areas for rice and other agricultural products. The Guárico River irrigation system, designed to serve approximately 60,000 hectares, made Calabozo Venezuela's main rice production center and consolidated its agro-industrial profile.

The city's demographic and economic growth during the second half of the 20th century was sustained. The population went from 4,712 inhabitants in 1950 to more than 130,000 in 2011, and is projected to reach 190,622 inhabitants in 2026. This growth was driven by migration from rural areas and the installation of agricultural product processing industries.

In 1979, Calabozo's historic center was declared a Zone of Historical Value by the Cultural Heritage Institute of Venezuela, recognizing the importance of its colonial and republican buildings.

In 2018, the city was the scene of a series of lootings that affected several local businesses, in the context of the economic and social crisis that the country has been experiencing since 2013.

In 2025, Mayor Janny Álvarez Mirabal assumed office, heading the municipal administration for the 2025–2028 period.

== Symbols ==
=== Coat of Arms ===
The coat of arms of Calabozo was created following the city's recognition as a "Villa" by the Council of the Indies in the 18th century. Its design presents symbolic elements associated with a walled Spanish city, including buildings, towers, a church, vegetation, and livestock, accompanied by a royal crown and two lions as exterior ornaments. The formal heraldic description of the coat of arms is documented in municipal archives and city chronicles.

The presence of the church and livestock on the coat of arms reflects the two pillars of Calabozo's economy and society during the colonial period: the Catholic religion, promoted by the missions, and livestock farming, the basis of the region's wealth. The royal crown and lions, for their part, are common elements in the heraldry of cities founded under the Spanish crown.

=== Anthem ===
Calabozo's anthem, known as "Villa Heroica," was composed with lyrics by Rafael Delgado and music by Rafael Santamaría. The composition refers to the city's historical origin, its missionary tradition, the events of the War of Independence, and Llanero identity. The anthem is performed at official events and civic celebrations of the city.

The title "Villa Heroica" alludes to Calabozo's role in the War of Independence, especially the battle of 1818, and the resistance of its inhabitants during the conflicts of the 19th century.

=== Motto ===
The city's motto, "Ven de nuevo a tus pampas" ("Come back to your plains"), evokes Llanero identity and pride in roots and territory. Its origin and official adoption are not precisely documented, but it is part of the oral tradition and popular culture of Calabozo.

== Geography ==
=== Location ===
Calabozo is located south of San Juan de los Morros, the capital of Guárico state, in the Central Llanos region. It is situated at 105 meters above sea level, in a region of plains crossed by the Guárico River. It is approximately 260 kilometers southwest of Caracas, the country's capital.

Approximate geographic coordinates: 8°55′N 67°25′W.

=== Relief ===
Calabozo's relief is predominantly flat, with some gentle undulations toward the east. Altitude varies between 72 and 139 meters above sea level, with an average of 105 meters. There are low areas susceptible to flooding during periods of overflow of the Guárico River, especially during the rainy season. The terrain corresponds to the formation of the Central High Plains, characterized by its gentle slope and alluvial soils.

=== Climate ===
According to the Köppen climate classification, Calabozo has a tropical savanna climate (Aw), with an average annual temperature of 27.5 °C. Two well-defined periods are distinguished: a dry season extending from November to May, and a rainy season from May to October. The hottest months are March, April, and September, while the coolest correspond to December and January.

Average annual precipitation is approximately 1,476 mm, concentrated between April and October, with peaks in May and July. Average annual relative humidity is around 70%.

Climate data for Calabozo, Venezuela (1991–2020)
Month	Jan	Feb	Mar	Apr	May	Jun	Jul	Aug	Sep	Oct	Nov	Dec	Year
Record high °F	102.0	103.6	105.6	103.8	103.8	98.4	96.6	97.0	98.2	98.4	102.0	101.7	105.6
Mean daily maximum °F	96.3	97.7	100.2	97.3	93.6	90.5	89.4	89.4	90.9	95.5	97.3	95.0	93.7
Daily mean °F	84.7	86.2	88.3	87.8	85.5	82.9	82.0	81.9	82.8	85.3	86.4	84.6	84.9
Mean daily minimum °F	73.2	74.7	76.5	78.3	77.2	75.4	74.5	74.3	74.7	74.8	75.2	74.1	75.2
Record low °F	51.3	55.9	55.4	68.0	70.3	67.1	68.0	68.0	68.5	68.4	61.2	65.5	51.3
Average precipitation inches	0.31	0.33	0.35	3.39	7.28	9.94	10.24	9.20	7.17	6.05	3.02	0.75	58.03
Record high °C	38.9	39.8	40.9	39.9	39.9	36.9	35.9	36.1	36.8	36.9	38.9	38.7	40.9
Mean daily maximum °C	35.7	36.5	37.9	36.3	34.2	32.5	31.9	31.9	32.7	35.3	36.3	35.0	34.3
Daily mean °C	29.3	30.1	31.3	31.0	29.7	28.3	27.8	27.7	28.2	29.6	30.2	29.2	29.4
Mean daily minimum °C	22.9	23.7	24.7	25.7	25.1	24.1	23.6	23.5	23.7	23.8	24.0	23.4	24.0
Record low °C	10.7	13.3	13.0	20.0	21.3	19.5	20.0	20.0	20.3	20.2	16.2	18.6	10.7
Average precipitation mm	7.8	8.5	8.8	86.2	184.8	252.6	260.0	233.8	182.2	153.7	76.6	19.0	1,474
Average precipitation days (≥ 1.0 mm)	1.4	1.0	1.1	5.2	12.0	16.1	17.2	16.9	12.7	10.7	5.6	2.3	102.2
Source: NOAA

=== Hydrography ===
Calabozo is located in the hydrographic basin of the Orinoco River, specifically in the sub-basin of the Guárico River, which is the main watercourse in the region. The Guárico River crosses the municipality from west to east and is dammed at the Generoso Campilongo Dam, destined for agricultural irrigation. The second most important watercourse is the Orituco River, which flows east of the urban area.

The average annual precipitation of 1,476 mm, concentrated between April and October, feeds the watercourses and maintains the reservoir levels. The irrigation system derived from the dam allows cultivation of approximately 60,000 hectares, which has made the region an important agricultural center.

== Ecology ==
=== Flora ===
The vegetation surrounding Calabozo corresponds to the Llanero savanna ecosystem, with formations of scattered grasses, interrupted by mogotes (rocky elevations) and gallery forests along the watercourses.

Among the characteristic vegetation formations are:

- Morichales: areas where the moriche palm (Mauritia flexuosa) predominates, a species typical of the floodable areas of the Llanos, providing food and shelter for various animal species.
- Gallery forests: strips of arboreal vegetation bordering watercourses, with species such as samán (Samanea saman), cedar (Cedrela odorata), and apamate (Tabebuia rosea).
- Grass savannas: extensive areas covered by grasses of the genera Trachypogon, Axonopus, and Paspalum, which form the basis of cattle feed.
- Esteros: low areas that flood seasonally, with vegetation adapted to flooded conditions.

=== Fauna ===
The region's fauna includes various representative species of the Venezuelan Llanos, many of which are found in the nearby Aguaro-Guariquito National Park:

Reptiles:

- Orinoco crocodile (Crocodylus intermedius), an endangered species.
- Galápagos (Podocnemis spp.), freshwater turtles.
- Anaconda (Eunectes murinus), South America's largest snake.
- Babo (Caiman crocodilus), a widely distributed caiman species.
- Venomous snakes such as the rattlesnake (Crotalus durissus) and coral snake (Micrurus spp.).
- Tragavenados (Boa constrictor), a large constrictor snake.

Mammals:

- Capybara (Hydrochoerus hydrochaeris), the world's largest rodent.
- Common opossum (Didelphis marsupialis), a widely distributed marsupial.
- Lapa (Cuniculus paca), a nocturnal rodent.
- Ocelot (Leopardus pardalis), a medium-sized feline.
- White-tailed deer (Odocoileus gymnotis), a cervid characteristic of the savannas.
- Howler monkey (Alouatta spp.), a primate of the gallery forests.
- Tamandua (Tamandua tetradactyla), a medium-sized anteater.
- Armadillo (Dasypus spp.), a savanna armadillo.

Birds:

- Turpial (Icterus icterus), Venezuela's national bird.
- Cacique (Cacicus spp.), with showy plumage.
- Guacharaca (Ortalis ruficauda), a traditional game bird.
- Whistling ducks (Dendrocygna spp.), anatidae of the savannas.
- Hawks (family Accipitridae), diurnal raptors.
- Parakeets (Psittacara spp.), small parrots.
- Bluebirds (Thraupis spp.), brightly colored birds.
- Cardinalitos (Paroaria spp.), with red and black plumage.
- Canaries (Sicalis spp.), with yellow plumage.
- Great kiskadee (Pitangus sulphuratus).

Fish:

In the Generoso Campilongo Dam and the Guárico and Orituco rivers, species such as:

- Curvinas (Plagioscion spp.), freshwater fish.
- Catfish (family Pimelodidae), widely distributed.
- Pavones (Cichla spp.), introduced sport fish.
- Electric eel (Gymnotus electricus), the subject of Carl Sachs' study.

== Demographics ==
Calabozo experienced significant demographic growth during the 20th and 21st centuries, driven by agricultural expansion, the construction of the irrigation system, and the development of agro-industry, which generated new economic opportunities and favored migration from rural areas.

The city's demographic evolution has been as follows:

Population evolution of Calabozo
Year	Population	Source
1780	3,448	Pastoral visit of Mariano Martí
1950	4,712	Population census
1961	15,738	Population census
1981	38,360	Population census
1990	79,578	Population census
2001	100,559	Population census
2011	131,989	Population census
2026 (proj.)	190,622	INE

Calabozo is the main urban center of the Francisco de Miranda Municipality and the most populous in Guárico state, concentrating approximately 25% of the state's total population. The estimated population density is 3,738 inhabitants per square kilometer, and 94% of the population is considered urban.

The population of Calabozo is predominantly mestizo, with an ethnic composition characteristic of the Venezuelan Llanos, resulting from the mixing of indigenous peoples, Europeans (mainly Spanish), and Africans during the colonial period. During the 20th century, the city received migratory flows from other regions of Venezuela, especially from the Andean states and from the east of the country, attracted by agro-industrial development.

== Economy ==
=== Agriculture ===
Agriculture constitutes the basis of Calabozo's economy. The Guárico River irrigation system, fed by the Generoso Campilongo Dam, allows the cultivation of extensive areas in a region that would otherwise be limited by the seasonality of rainfall. The main crops are:

- Rice: Calabozo is Venezuela's main rice production center. The crop benefits from high-pH soils and anaerobic conditions that optimize cultivation. The region's rice production supplies both the domestic market and the local processing industry.
- Corn: an important crop for animal and human nutrition, both white and yellow corn.
- Legumes: beans and black beans, grown mainly on small and medium-sized farms.
- Tobacco: a traditional crop of the region, although its production has decreased in recent decades.
- Vegetables: tomatoes and bell peppers, grown under irrigation for the local and regional market.
- Cotton: an industrial crop, although its area has varied according to market conditions.
- Cassava: a traditional crop of small farms.

=== Livestock ===
Livestock has historically been one of the pillars of Calabozo's economy. Cattle farming predominates, fed on extensive areas of natural and improved pastures. Dairy production is relevant, and the region is recognized as one of the main cheese production centers in the Venezuelan Llanos.

Cattle farming is oriented toward both meat and milk production. The livestock herd of the Francisco de Miranda Municipality is one of the most important in Guárico state, and the city functions as a collection and marketing center for livestock products.

=== Agro-industry ===
Agro-industry is the predominant economic sector in Calabozo, focused on the transformation of agricultural and livestock products. Among the main agro-industrial activities are:

- Rice processing: the city has important processing plants and storage silos, which constitute one of the most visible features of its industrial landscape.
- Animal feed production: for animal feed, linked to livestock farming.
- Dairy product processing: cheeses, butter, and other derivatives.
- Preparation of preserves and processed foods: for the local and regional market.

Calabozo's agro-industry generates direct and indirect employment for a significant part of the population and attracts investments from other regions of the country.

=== Commerce and services ===
Calabozo functions as a service center for a wide region of the Central Llanos, including localities in the states of Guárico, Apure, and Cojedes. The commercial and service sector has grown in parallel with agro-industrial development, and the city has a diversified offering of commercial establishments, financial institutions, and professional services.

=== Gastronomy ===
Local gastronomy is part of the culinary tradition of the Venezuelan Llanos, characterized by the use of meats, river fish, grains, and tubers.

Among Calabozo's typical dishes are:

- Gallopinto: a dish based on rice and black beans, similar to pabellón criollo.
- Pisillo de pescado: shredded dried fish meat, usually catfish or curbina.
- Carne en vara: meat roasted on a stick, typical of Llanero grills.
- Queso de mano: fresh artisanal cow's milk cheese, characteristic of the Llanos.
- Hervido de res: beef soup with vegetables and tubers.
- Mondongo: soup based on beef tripe, with vegetables and spices.
- Pastel de morrocoy: preparation based on land turtle meat.
- Parrilla llanera: grilled meat, served with cassava, plantain, and salad.
- Pabellón criollo: Venezuela's national dish, with black beans, rice, shredded beef, and fried plantain.
- Paloapique: a typical Llanero dessert, based on panela and fruits.

Among sweets and preserves are:

- Jams from tropical fruits (papaya, guava, mango).
- Preserved fruits in syrup.
- Catalinas: typical sweet cookies.
- Panela with lemon: a traditional refreshing drink.

== Transport ==
=== Air transport ===
Calabozo Airport serves the city and its area of influence. It has a paved runway and offers regional air connections, mainly with Caracas and other cities in the Llanos. In 1960, the airport was the scene of the hijacking of Línea Aeropostal Venezolana Flight 304, an event that had national and international repercussions.

=== Land transport ===
Calabozo is connected to Caracas (260 km) via the Troncal 2, one of the main communication routes of the Central Llanos with the country's capital.

The main entrances to the city are:

- North: route to San Juan de los Morros (Dos Caminos).
- South: route to San Fernando de Apure.
- East-North: route to El Sombrero.
- West-South: route to Paso El Caballo, with connection to Cojedes state.

The Francisco de Miranda Avenue is one of the city's main thoroughfares and concentrates much of the commercial and service activity. Urban public transport consists of bus and van lines that connect the center with peripheral neighborhoods.

=== Fluvial transport ===
The Guárico River is navigable in some sections, although its use for fluvial transport is limited and mainly reduced to recreational and fishing activities.

== Education ==
Calabozo has educational institutions at all levels: initial, primary, secondary, and higher education. The educational offering includes public and private schools, and the city functions as an educational reference center for southern Guárico state.

=== Higher education ===
Among the higher education institutions present in Calabozo are:

- Universidad Nacional Experimental Rómulo Gallegos (UNERG) — Calabozo Campus: offers undergraduate programs in areas such as health sciences, agricultural sciences, and social sciences. It is one of the region's main universities and serves students from throughout Guárico state and neighboring states.
- Instituto Universitario Monseñor Arias Blanco: a private religious higher education institution, offering programs in education and humanities.
- Colegio Universitario de Administración y Mercadeo: a private institution specialized in training in administrative, accounting, and marketing sciences.
- Universidad Nacional Abierta (UNA): a public distance university, with a local campus in Calabozo, offering undergraduate programs in various areas.
- Instituto Politécnico Universitario de Tecnología de los Llanos: a technology training institution, with programs in technical and agro-industrial areas.
- Misión Sucre (Calabozo Campus): a national higher education program of the Venezuelan government, offering undergraduate programs in alliance with public universities.

== Sports ==
=== Football ===
Calabozo has two football teams:

- Guárico FC: participates in the Venezuelan Third Division, the third category of Venezuelan professional football.
- Arroceros de Calabozo: a historic club of the city, which trains and plays at the Alfredo Simonpietri Stadium, with a capacity of 2,500 spectators.

=== Sports infrastructure ===
The city has an Olympic center that includes:

- Multi-sport pavilion: for basketball, volleyball, and indoor track sports.
- Baseball stadium: for the practice of this sport, traditional in the region.
- Covered dome: for sporting and cultural events.

The Alfredo Simonpietri Stadium is the city's main sports venue and has hosted professional football matches and regional events.

=== Other disciplines ===
Traditional Llanero sports such as toros coleados (rodeo) and horse racing are also practiced in Calabozo, which form part of the region's cultural identity and are celebrated at local festivals.

== Heritage and points of interest ==
Calabozo's heritage is one of the city's most distinctive features.

The historic center preserves buildings that reflect different stages of urban evolution: colonial architecture, republican constructions, and buildings from the early decades of the 20th century.

=== Zone of Historical Value ===
Calabozo's historic center was declared a Zone of Historical Value on March 22, 1979, by the Cultural Heritage Institute of Venezuela. This declaration protects a set of buildings from the 18th, 19th, and early 20th centuries, which includes:

- The Metropolitan Cathedral of All Saints.
- The Church of Our Lady of the Angels (18th century).
- The Church of Our Lady of Carmen (1835-1846).
- Plaza Bolívar and its surrounding buildings.
- Old colonial and republican houses.
- The City Museum.
- The Francisco Lazo Martí Cultural House.

=== Metropolitan Cathedral of All Saints ===
Built between 1754 and 1790, the Metropolitan Cathedral of All Saints is considered an example of Baroque influence in Venezuelan religious architecture. Its main facade, in a neoclassical style with Baroque elements, faces Plaza Bolívar and is one of the city's most emblematic buildings. The cathedral houses religious images of historical value and has been the scene of important liturgical and civic events throughout Calabozo's history.

=== Bolívar Square ===
Located in front of the Metropolitan Cathedral, Plaza Bolívar occupies an entire block and constitutes the city's foundational nucleus. At its center stands a bronze equestrian statue of Simón Bolívar, created in the 19th century. The square is surrounded by historic buildings, including the Cathedral, the Municipal Palace, and old colonial houses, making it the heart of Calabozo's historic center.

=== Churches ===
- Church of Our Lady of Mercy: located in front of a square that houses a statue of José Antonio Páez. It is a colonial architectural building dating from the 18th century.
- Church of Our Lady of Carmen: declared a National Historical Monument in 1979. Its construction began in 1835 and it was consecrated in 1846, being an example of religious architecture from the republican period. It features a neoclassical facade and a Latin cross plan.
- Church of Our Lady of the Angels: the city's oldest church, with a colonial style and a single nave, dates from the 18th century. Originally part of the mission town of Our Lady of the Angels of Calabozo, its building has survived the city's urban transformations.

=== City Museum ===
The City Museum is located in an old colonial house in the historic center and was acquired by the municipality in 2004. It displays objects, documents, and archaeological pieces related to the city's history and the Llanos region. The collection includes pieces from the pre-Hispanic era, objects from the colony and independence, and testimonies of 20th-century agro-industrial development. It is one of the city's main cultural institutions.

=== Francisco Lazo Martí Cultural House ===
A corner building built in the 18th century, declared within the Zone of Historical Value in 1979. It houses exhibition halls, a theater, and spaces for cultural workshops, functioning as a center for promoting the arts and local culture. It bears the name of the Calabozo poet Francisco Lazo Martí, in homage to his contribution to Venezuelan literature.

=== Generoso Campilongo Dam ===
The dam, built in 1956, is one of Venezuela's main hydraulic engineering works. Named after its designer, engineer Generoso Campilongo, it supplies the region's irrigation system, allowing the cultivation of approximately 60,000 hectares. In addition to its agricultural function, the dam is a scenic attraction and a space for sport fishing and recreational activities. Its waters host species such as curvinas, catfish, and pavones, which attract sport fishermen.

=== Aguaro-Guariquito National Park ===
Created by Decree No. 1,686 of March 7, 1974, Aguaro-Guariquito National Park covers 569,000 hectares in southern Guárico state, in the Central Llanos region. It is the fifth largest national park in Venezuela and protects savanna, gallery forest, and morichal ecosystems, as well as a diverse fauna that includes endangered species such as the Orinoco crocodile and the jaguar. The park is located approximately 50 km south of the city and is a destination for ecotourism and scientific research.

== Notable people ==
Throughout its history, Calabozo has been the birthplace of prominent figures in politics, literature, science, and religion:

- Francisco Lazo Martí (1857–1909): poet and physician, one of the main representatives of 19th-century Venezuelan literature. Author of works such as Cantos de la llanura and Silva criolla, which exalt the landscape and culture of the Llanos. His poetry has been widely studied and recognized as part of the Venezuelan literary canon.
- Carlos del Pozo y Sucre (1746–1814): self-taught inventor and scientist, admired by Alexander von Humboldt for his electrical experiments. He represents an example of scientific capacity in colonial Venezuela and has been the subject of historical and biographical studies.
- Salustiano Crespo (1812–1875): first bishop of Calabozo, a relevant figure in the ecclesiastical history of Venezuela. He promoted the development of the diocese and left a legacy in the organization of the Catholic Church in the Llanos.
- Luis Sanojo (1834–1890): politician and jurist, a prominent figure of 19th-century Venezuela. He held important public positions and participated in the country's political life during the period of consolidation of the Venezuelan state.

== Parishes ==
The Francisco de Miranda Municipality, of which Calabozo is the capital, is made up of four civil parishes:

- Calabozo: the parish bearing the city's name, which includes the main urban area and its immediate surroundings.
- Guardatinajas: northwest of the city, an agricultural and livestock locality.
- El Rastro: to the southwest, with agricultural activities.
- El Calvario: east of the municipality, a population with livestock tradition.

These parishes constitute the smallest administrative divisions within the municipality.

== See also ==
- List of cities in Venezuela by population

== Bibliography ==
- Castillo Lara, Lucas Guillermo (1975). Villa de todos los santos de Calabozo: el derecho de existir bajo el sol. Caracas: Italgráfica. OCLC 253086938
- Humboldt, Alexander von (1826). Viaje a las regiones equinocciales del Nuevo Continente. Caracas: Monte Ávila Editores. ISBN 980-01-0070-2.
- Huber, Otto (1982). La vegetación de las sabanas llaneras de Venezuela. Caracas: Ediciones del Fondo Editorial Actas Venezolanas.
- Cartay, Rafael (2005). Diccionario de cocina venezolana. Caracas: Alfadil. ISBN 978-980-354-155-2.
- Instituto Nacional de Estadística (INE) (2024). Proyecciones de población, 2015-2030. Caracas.
