= Generoso Campilongo Dam =

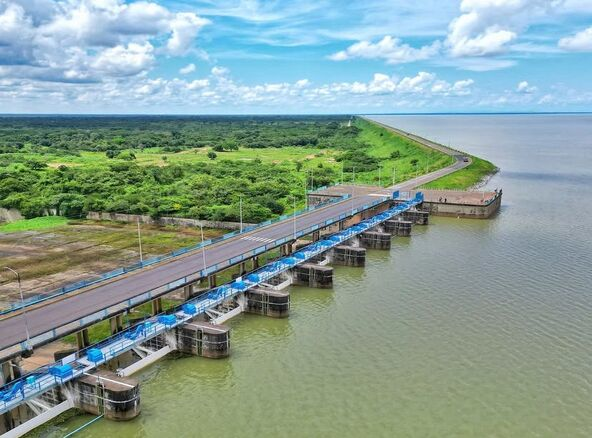
- View of the reservoir from the city of Calabozo.

- Location in Venezuela
- Official name: Embalse Ing. Generoso Campilongo
- Country: Venezuela
- Location: Guárico state
- Coordinates: 8.9435°N 67.4035°W
- Purpose: Irrigation, flood control
- Status: Operational
- Construction began: 1954
- Opening date: 1956
- Owner: Venezuelan State

Dam and spillways
- Type of dam: Earth-fill embankment
- Impounds: Guárico River
- Height: 30 m (98 ft)
- Length: 15 km (9.3 mi)
- Spillway type: Frontal, controlled with radial gates

Reservoir
- Creates: Generoso Campilongo Reservoir
- Total capacity: 1,840 hm^{3} (1,490,000 acre⋅ft)
- Surface area: 230 km^{2} (89 sq mi)

The Generoso Campilongo Dam (Spanish: Embalse Ing. Generoso Campilongo), originally and popularly known as the Guárico Dam (Spanish: Embalse del Guárico), is a large hydraulic infrastructure project located near the city of Calabozo, in Guárico state, Venezuela. Its current name honors the Italian-born engineer Generoso Campilongo, who led the technical direction of its construction.

It is the central axis of the Guárico River Irrigation System, designed to transform the savannas of the low plains into an important agricultural production area (mainly rice) and to provide an effective flood control mechanism. Formally inaugurated in the late 1950s during the government of President Marcos Pérez Jiménez, it represents one of the country's most emblematic engineering works.

== History ==
During the first half of the 20th century, the central plains of Guárico state suffered from recurrent periods of severe drought that decimated crops and regional livestock, alternating with uncontrolled floods and overflows. To solve this problem, the Ministry of Public Works began topographic and agrological studies in January 1953 aimed at harnessing the flow of the Guárico River.

Through decrees issued in December 1953, the expropriation of more than 55,500 hectares destined for the reservoir and agricultural development zones was approved. The symbolic act of laying the first stone took place on February 2, 1954, marking the formal start of construction work.

"Land reform is destined for the social benefit of certain classes and the achievement of beneficial production resulting from the conjunction of more suitable lands with more suitable people, duly equipped with means for work."

— Marcos Pérez Jiménez

== Construction ==
The physical works progressed rapidly thanks to the massive deployment of heavy machinery during the dry seasons, moving millions of cubic meters of earth to build the compacted embankments and the containment dike (popularly known for its extensive closure section or "plug").

Construction officially concluded on November 3, 1956—in a record time of 33 months—with a total investment exceeding 408 million bolívars of the time, distributed among the dam, compensation for expropriation of estates, and the development of the irrigation canal network. The system became operational on December 19, 1956.

== Uses and agricultural settlements ==
Starting in 1957, the first controlled irrigation seasons began. Over the years, and in response to demographic pressure and the needs of farm workers, various peasant settlements were consolidated, organized into production cooperatives, most notably the founding of the Lecherito I (November 1959) and Lecherito II (1962) sectors, which became bastions of national rice production.

By Decree No. 1,979 of May 8, 1980, the dam officially adopted the name "Engineer Generoso Campilongo" Dam. Its canal network supplies irrigable hectares located in the basins of the Guárico and Tiznados rivers.

== Regional importance ==
The dam plays a critical hydrographic role in Guárico state. It regulates flows during the rainy season by opening its gates preventively to avoid overflows and catastrophic flooding, while during the dry months it guarantees water supply both for local populations and for prioritizing the irrigation of extensive agricultural crop modules.

== See also ==
- Calabozo
- Guárico River
- Marcos Pérez Jiménez
- List of dams and reservoirs in Venezuela
