= Francisco de Miranda Municipality, Guárico =

Francisco de Miranda Municipality Municipio Francisco de Miranda
- Municipality
- Municipality of Francisco de Miranda
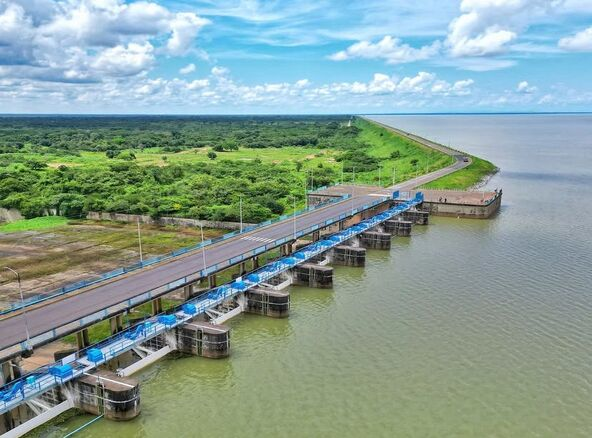
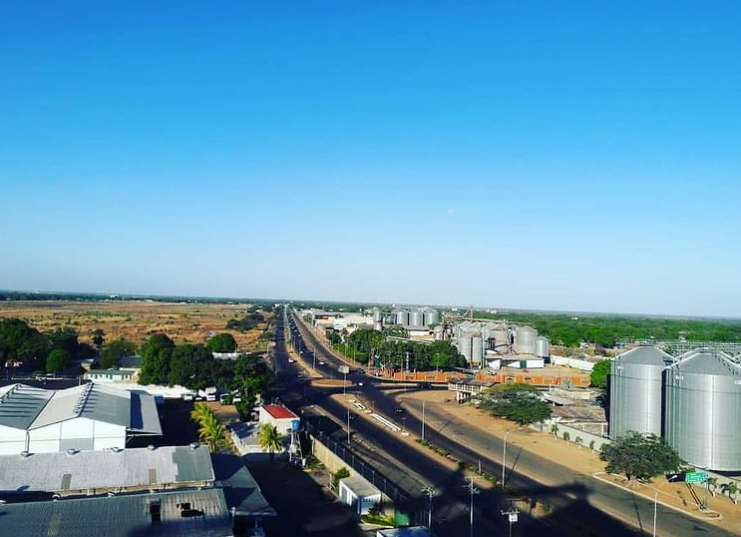
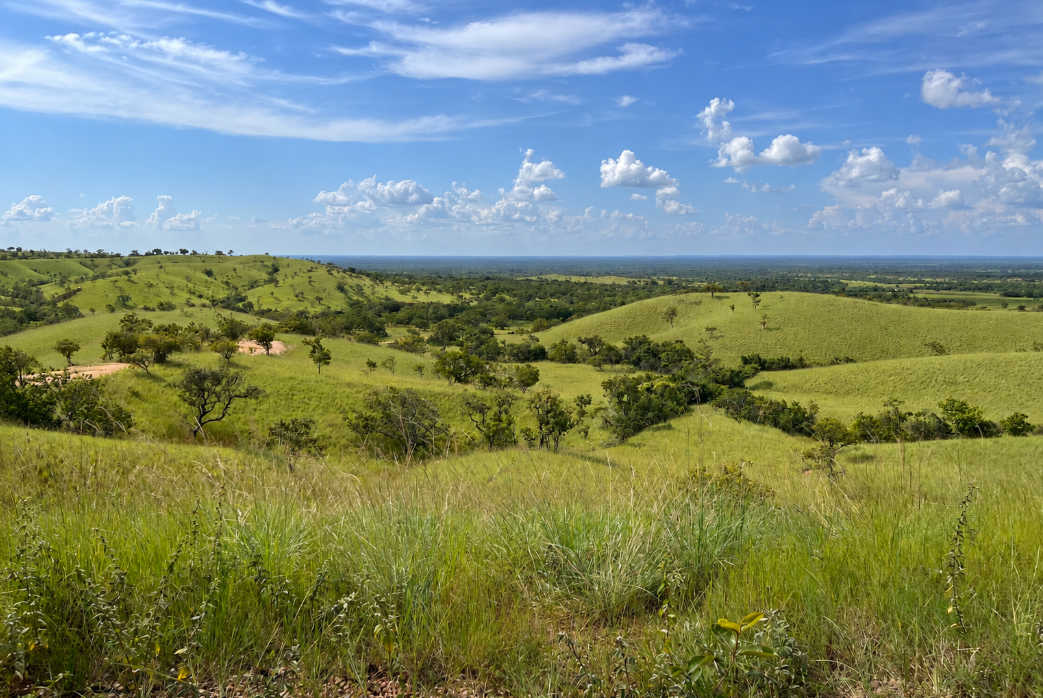
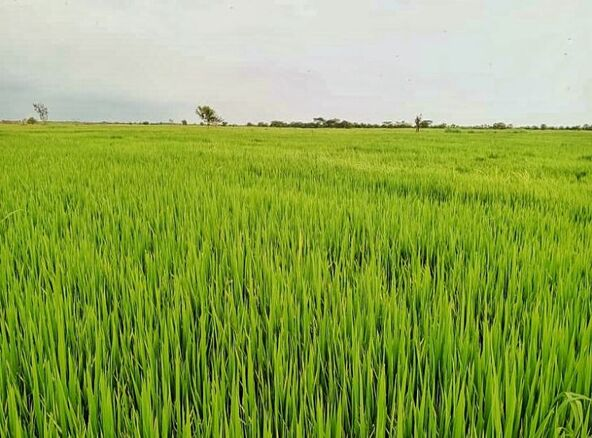
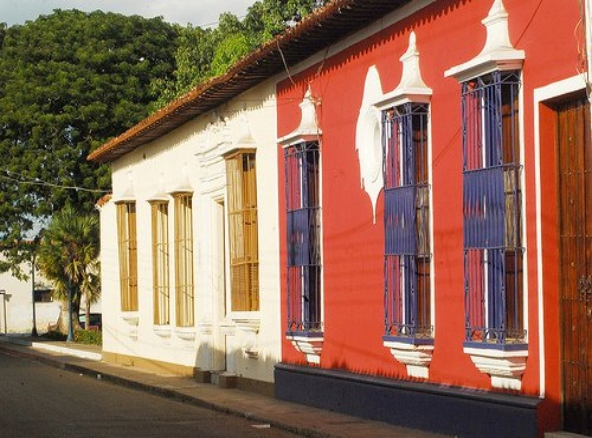
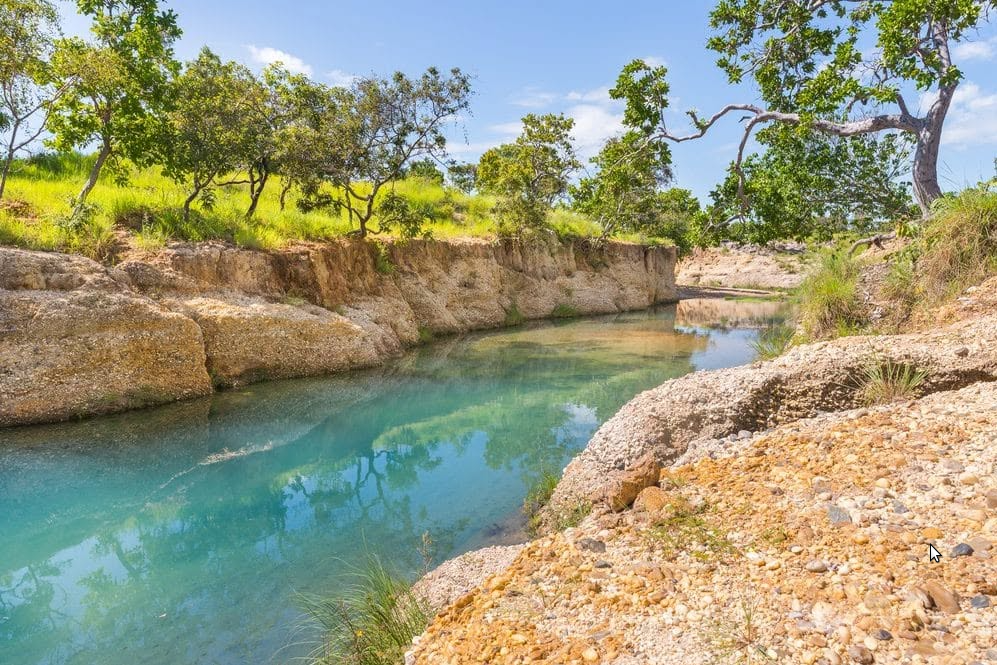
- From top left to bottom right: Generoso Campilongo Dam; Lomas de Los Aceites; Rice fields; Landscapes of Corozopando; Colonial center of Calabozo; Wells in Aguaro-Guariquito National Park

- Flag

- Location of Francisco de Miranda Municipality in Guárico
- Coordinates: 8°45′22″N 67°18′28″W
- Country: Venezuela
- State: Guárico
- Capital: Calabozo

Government
  - Mayor: Janny Álvarez Mirabal (PSUV)

Area
  - Total: 13,490 km^{2} (5,210 sq mi)
- Highest elevation: 230 m (750 ft)
- Lowest elevation: 34 m (112 ft)

Population (2026 (projection))
  - Total: 200,622
  - Density: 14.87/km^{2} (38.5/sq mi)
- Demonym: Mirandino/a
- Time zone: UTC−4 (VET)

Francisco de Miranda Municipality is one of the fifteen municipalities that make up the Guárico state, in Venezuela. Its capital is the city of Calabozo, the former capital of Guárico. With a surface area of 13,490 km² and a projected population of 200,622 inhabitants for 2026, it is the largest and most populous municipality in the state.

It is located in the Los Llanos geographical region, specifically in the Central High Plains. Its terrain is characterized by extensive plains with low elevation changes, with moderate elevations to the north and east. The municipality's highest point is Cerro Agua Blanca, at 230 meters above sea level, located in the Lomas de Los Aceites, within Aguaro-Guariquito National Park. The lowest point is the mouth of the Mocapra River, at approximately 34 meters above sea level.

The municipality's economy is closely linked to agriculture, livestock, and agro-industry. The production and processing of rice stand out, an activity favored by the Guárico River Irrigation System. The city of Calabozo constitutes the main urban, commercial, and service center of the municipality and one of the main economic hubs of the Venezuelan Llanos.

== Geography ==
Francisco de Miranda Municipality covers an extensive area in Guárico state and has a low population density over much of its territory. This characteristic has historically favored the development of extensive agricultural and livestock activities and the presence of large production units.

The climate is predominantly tropical savanna, characterized by a marked dry season and a rainy period. During the rainy season, low-lying areas in the south may experience periodic flooding associated with overflowing river channels and the natural dynamics of the plains.

In the northern area is the Guárico Dam, also known as the Generoso Campilongo Dam, one of the municipality's main hydraulic infrastructures. The dam performs functions related to water storage and regulation and the development of the region's agricultural irrigation system.

=== Limits ===
- North: Ortiz and Julián Mellado municipalities, and Aragua state.
- East: Juan José Rondón Municipality.
- West: Cojedes state and Barinas state.
- South: Camaguán and San Gerónimo de Guayabal municipalities.

=== Hydrography ===
The municipal territory is part of the extensive hydrographic network of the Llanos, and its waters belong to the Orinoco Basin. Among the main watercourses present in the municipality are:

- Guárico River
- Orituco River
- Tiznados River
- Guariquito River
- Mocapra River
- Chirgua River
- Pao River
- Portuguesa River
- San José River

=== Parish Organization ===
The municipality is administratively divided into four parishes:

Parish	Area (km²)	Population (2026)	Density (hab./km²)
El Calvario	4,556	1,600	0.35
El Rastro	361	3,210	8.89
Guardatinajas	3,289	5,190	1.58
Calabozo	5,284	190,622	36.07
Francisco de Miranda Municipality	13,490	200,622	14.87

The Calabozo parish concentrates the majority of the municipal population and constitutes the main urban and service nucleus. The parishes of Guardatinajas, El Rastro, and El Calvario have considerably smaller populations and a predominantly rural character.

Other towns and villages: Corozopando, Palo Seco, Palenque, Paso El Caballo, Santa María de Tiznados, and El Socorro de Portuguesa.

== Economy ==
The municipality's economy is based mainly on agriculture, livestock, and associated agro-industrial activities.

Agriculture is particularly important in areas benefited by the Guárico River Irrigation System, with rice cultivation standing out. The availability of hydraulic infrastructure has allowed the development of extensive agricultural areas and industries dedicated to processing agricultural products.

Extensive livestock farming also occupies an important part of the municipal territory, especially in rural areas with lower population density.

== Tourism ==
The municipality has various natural, historical, cultural, and architectural attractions:

- Historic Center of Calabozo
- Metropolitan Cathedral of Calabozo
- Guárico Dam
- Aguaro-Guariquito National Park
- Hato Masagüaral
- Hato La Fe, in Corozopando
- Santa Bárbara Church
- Esteros de El Samán
- Lomas de Los Aceites
- Guárico River Irrigation System
- Esteros de Camaguán Wildlife Reserve
- Médanos de Mata Sola
- Landscapes and characteristic ecosystems of the Venezuelan Llanos

Hato Masagüaral stands out for its importance in the conservation of Llanero fauna species, including the Orinoco crocodile, an emblematic species of Venezuelan river ecosystems.

== Politics and government ==
=== Mayors ===
Period	Mayor	Party	% of votes	Notes
1989–1992	Luis Santamaría	AD	50.89	First mayor elected by direct vote.
1992–1995	José Pilar Barbella Ramos	MAS	32.84	Second mayor elected by direct vote.
1995–1999	Octavio Viana Troconis	AD	—	Died in office on March 17, 1999.
1999–2000	Luis Torrealba	AD	—	Interim mayor, president of the Municipal Council.
2000–2004	Gabriel González	PPT	31.88	Fourth mayor elected by direct vote.
2004–2008	Teófilo Rodríguez Díaz	MVR	57.54	Fifth elected mayor.
2008–2013	Porfirio Fajardo	PSUV	66.52	Municipal term extended due to the reorganization of the electoral calendar.
2013–2017	Zobeida El Hinnaoui	PSUV	51.41	Seventh municipal administration.
2017–2021	Francisco Graterol	PSUV	73.74	Eighth elected mayor.
2021–2025	Donald Donaire	PSUV	58.97	Ninth elected mayor.
2025–2029	Janny Álvarez Mirabal	PSUV	—	Current mayor.

=== Municipal Council ===
==== Period 2021–2025 ====
Councilor	Political party / Alliance
Rafael Jiménez	PSUV
Ylmarys Osto	PSUV
Janny Álvarez	PSUV
Carlos Garrido	PSUV
Belki Hidalgo	PSUV
Gustavo Jiménez	PSUV
Yadira Ramírez	PSUV
Exon Arraiz	PSUV
Freylis González	PSUV

== See also ==
- Calabozo
- Embalse Guárico
- Aguaro-Guariquito National Park
- Guárico state
