= CLZ =

CLZ may refer to:

- Count leading zeros, a computer programming bit operation
- Calabozo Airport, Calabozo, Guárico, Venezuela
- Clonazepam, a medication used for seizure treatment
