= History of bioelectricity =

The history of bioelectricity dates back to ancient Egypt, where the shocks delivered by the electric catfish were used medicinally.

In the 18th century, the abilities of the torpedo ray and the electric eel were investigated by scientists including Hugh Williamson and John Walsh.

== Fish that give shocks ==
=== Ancient Egypt ===
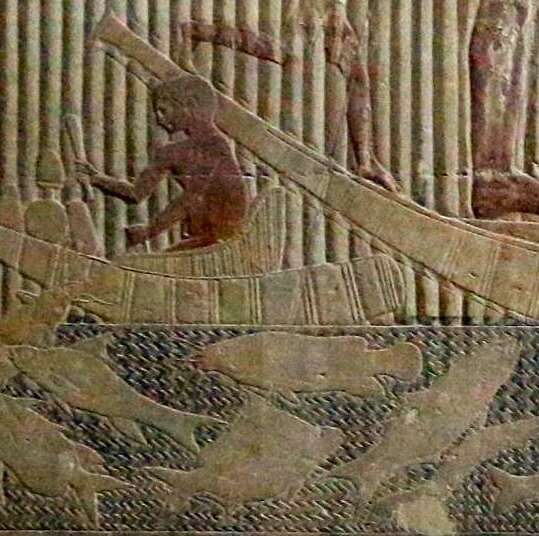
Electric catfish (centre) in Mastaba of Ti bas-relief, Saqqara, ancient Egypt

The electric catfish of the Nile was well known to the ancient Egyptians. The Egyptians reputedly used the electric shock from them when treating arthritic pain. They would use only smaller fish, as a large fish may generate an electric shock from 300 to 400 volts. The Egyptians depicted the fish in their mural paintings and elsewhere; the first known depiction of an electric catfish is on a slate palette of the predynastic Egyptian ruler Narmer about 3100 BC.

=== Ancient Greece and Rome ===
Electric fishes were known to Aristotle, Theophrastus, and Pliny the Elder among other classical authors. They did not always distinguish between the marine torpedo ray and the freshwater electric catfish.

Aristotle wrote that the Torpedo fish stunned its prey and was able to cause numbness even to human beings.

=== Eighteenth century ===
The naturalists Bertrand Bajon, a French military surgeon in French Guiana and the Jesuit Ramón M. Termeyer in the River Plate basin conducted early experiments on the numbing discharges of electric eels in the 1760s. In 1775, the "torpedo" (the electric ray) was studied by John Walsh; both fish were dissected by the surgeon and anatomist John Hunter. Hunter informed the Royal Society that "Gymnotus Electricus ... appears very much like an eel ... but it has none of the specific properties of that fish." He observed that there were "two pair of these [electric] organs, a larger [the main organ] and a smaller [Hunter's organ]; one being placed on each side", and that they occupied "perhaps ... more than one-third of the whole animal [by volume]". He described the structure of the organs (stacks of electrocytes) as "extremely simple and regular, consisting of two parts; viz. flat partitions or septa, and cross divisions between them." He measured the electrocytes as 1/17 of an inch thick (1.5 mm) in the main organ, and 1/56 of an inch thick (0.5 mm) in Hunter's organ.

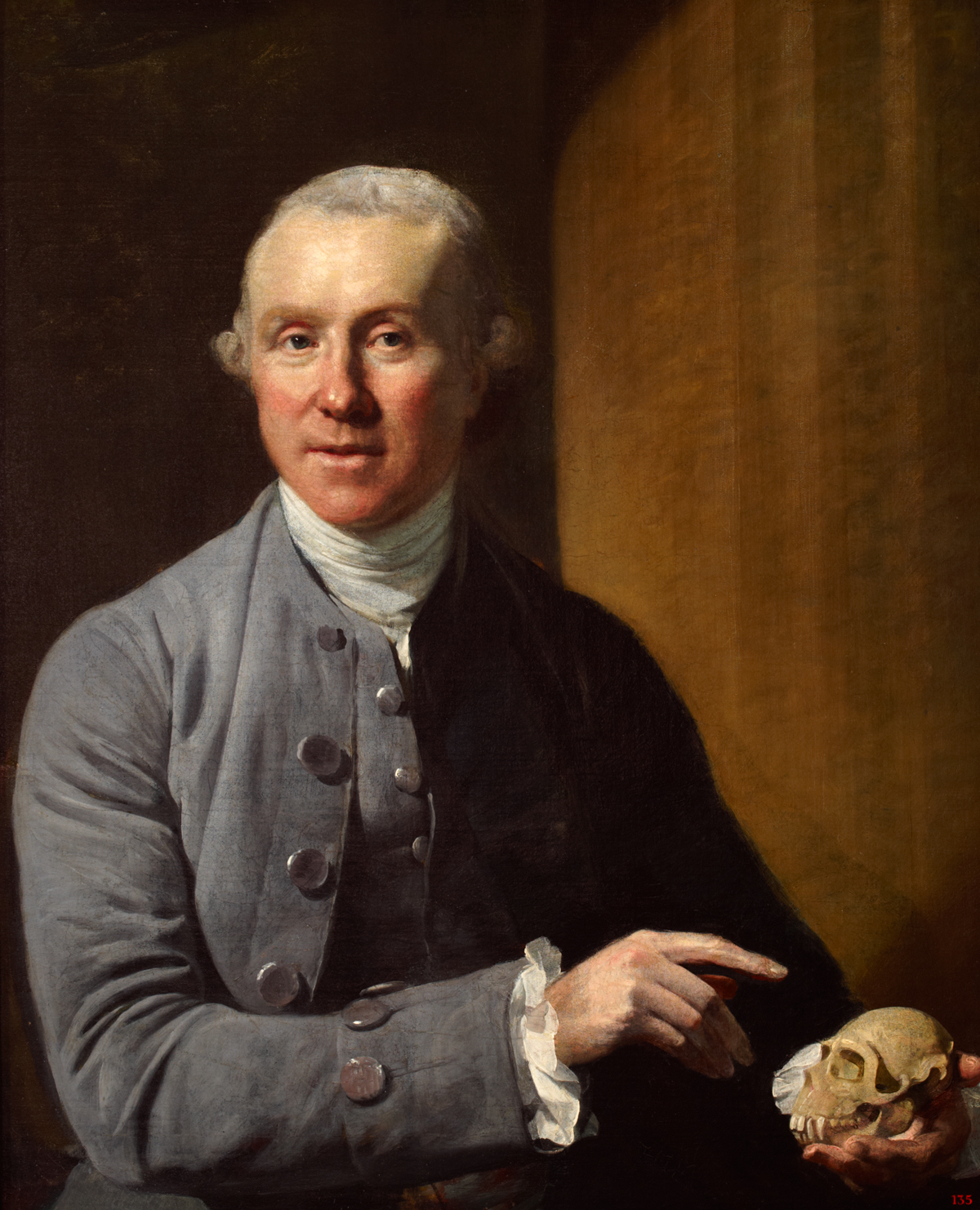
The surgeon John Hunter dissected an electric eel in 1775.

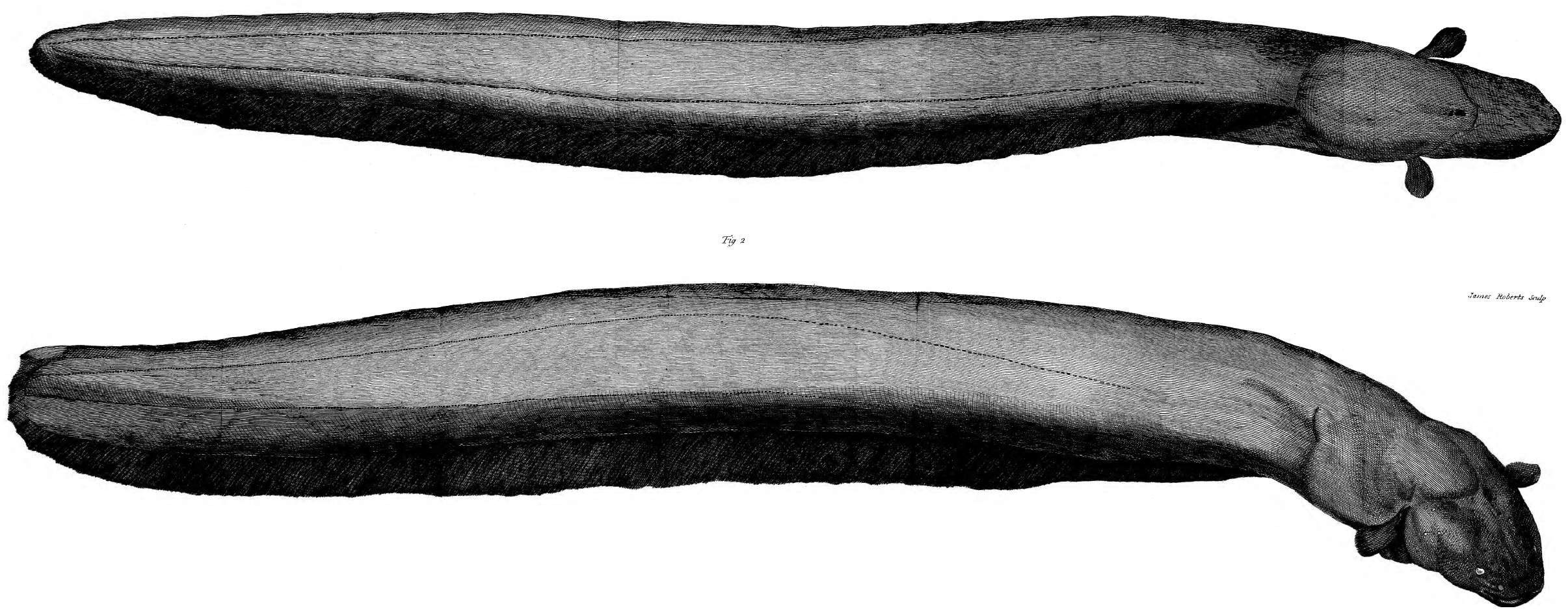
Hunter's "Gymnotus Electricus", underside and upperside, 1775.
The figure occupied four pages of his paper for the Royal Society.

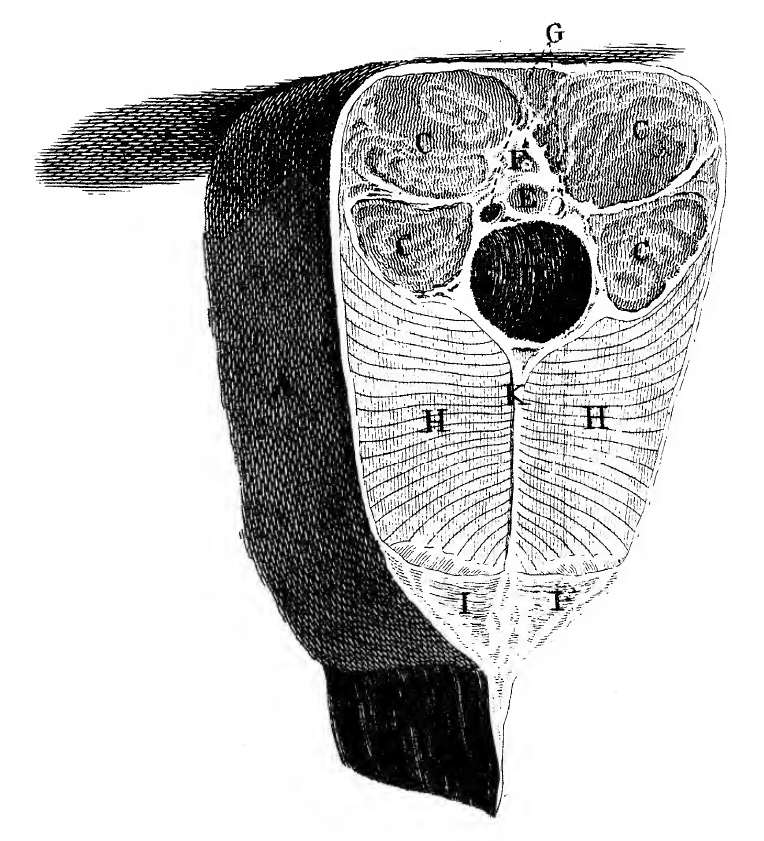
Cross-section:
C=Back muscles, H=main organ, I=Hunter's organ

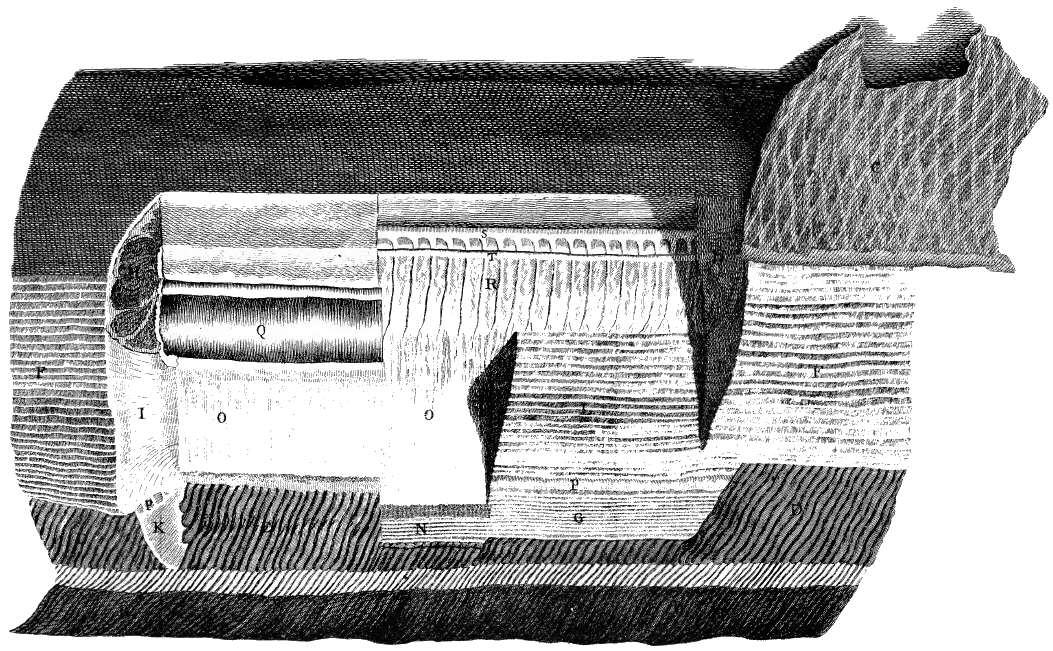
Dissection, showing the electric organs inside the body. At right, the skin is folded back to reveal the main organ above Hunter's organ.

Also in 1775, the American physician and politician Hugh Williamson, who had studied with Hunter, presented a paper "Experiments and observations on the Gymnotus Electricus, or electric eel" at the Royal Society. He reported a series of experiments, such as "7. In order to discover whether the eel killed those fish by an emission of the same [electrical] fluid with which he affected my hand when I had touched him, I put my hand into the water, at some distance from the eel; another cat-fish was thrown into the water; the eel swam up to it ... [and] gave it a shock, by which it instantly turned up its belly, and continued motionless; at that very instant I felt such a sensation in the joints of my fingers as in experiment 4." and "12. Instead of putting my hand into the water, at a distance from the eel, as in the last experiment, I touched its tail, so as not to offend it, while my assistant touched its head more roughly; we both received a severe shock."

=== Galvanism ===
The studies by Williamson, Walsh, and Hunter appear to have influenced the thinking of Luigi Galvani and Alessandro Volta – the founders of electrophysiology and electrochemistry.

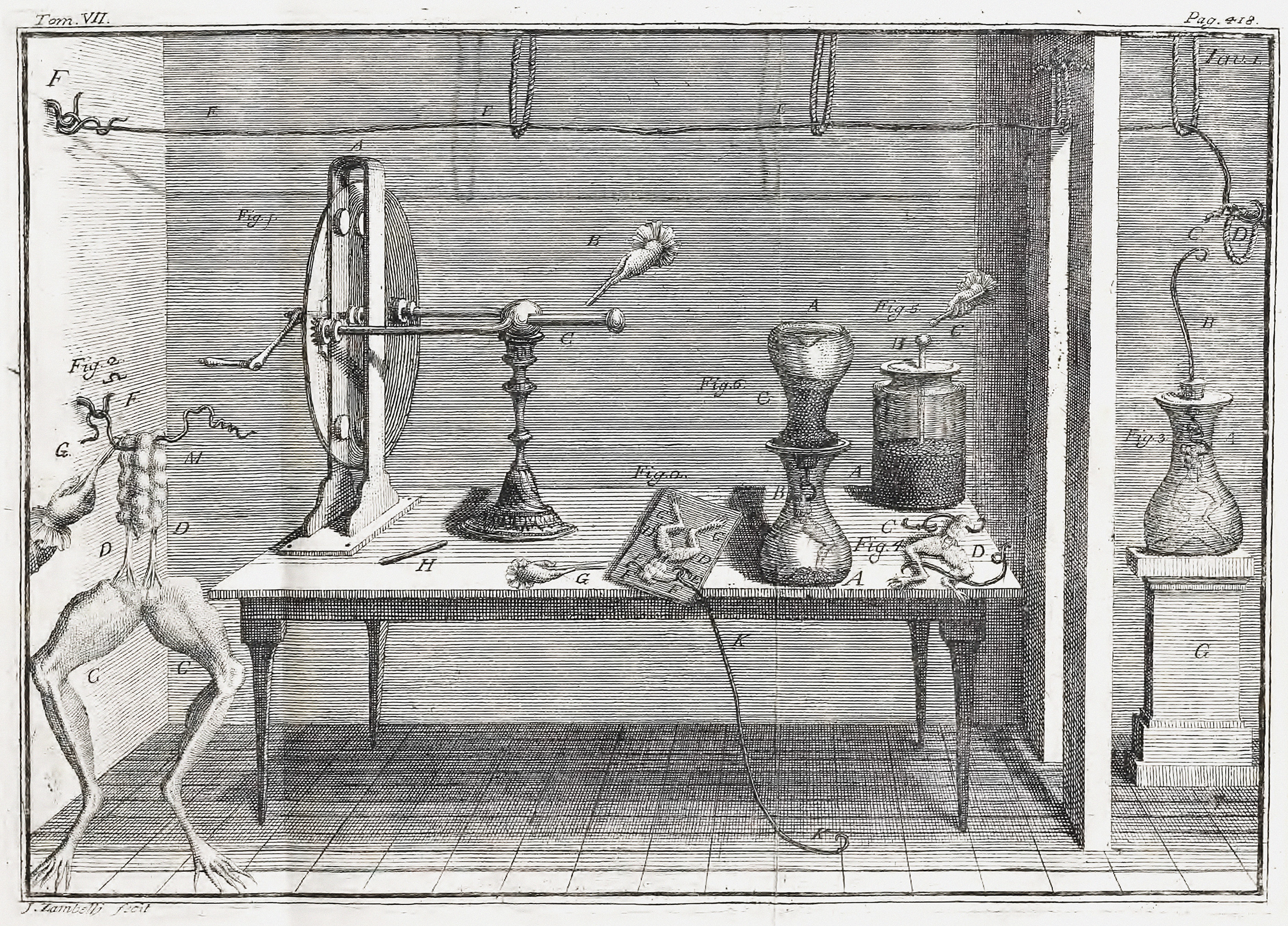
Luigi Galvani's laboratory, from De viribus electricitatis in motu musculari ("On the electric powers in muscle movement")

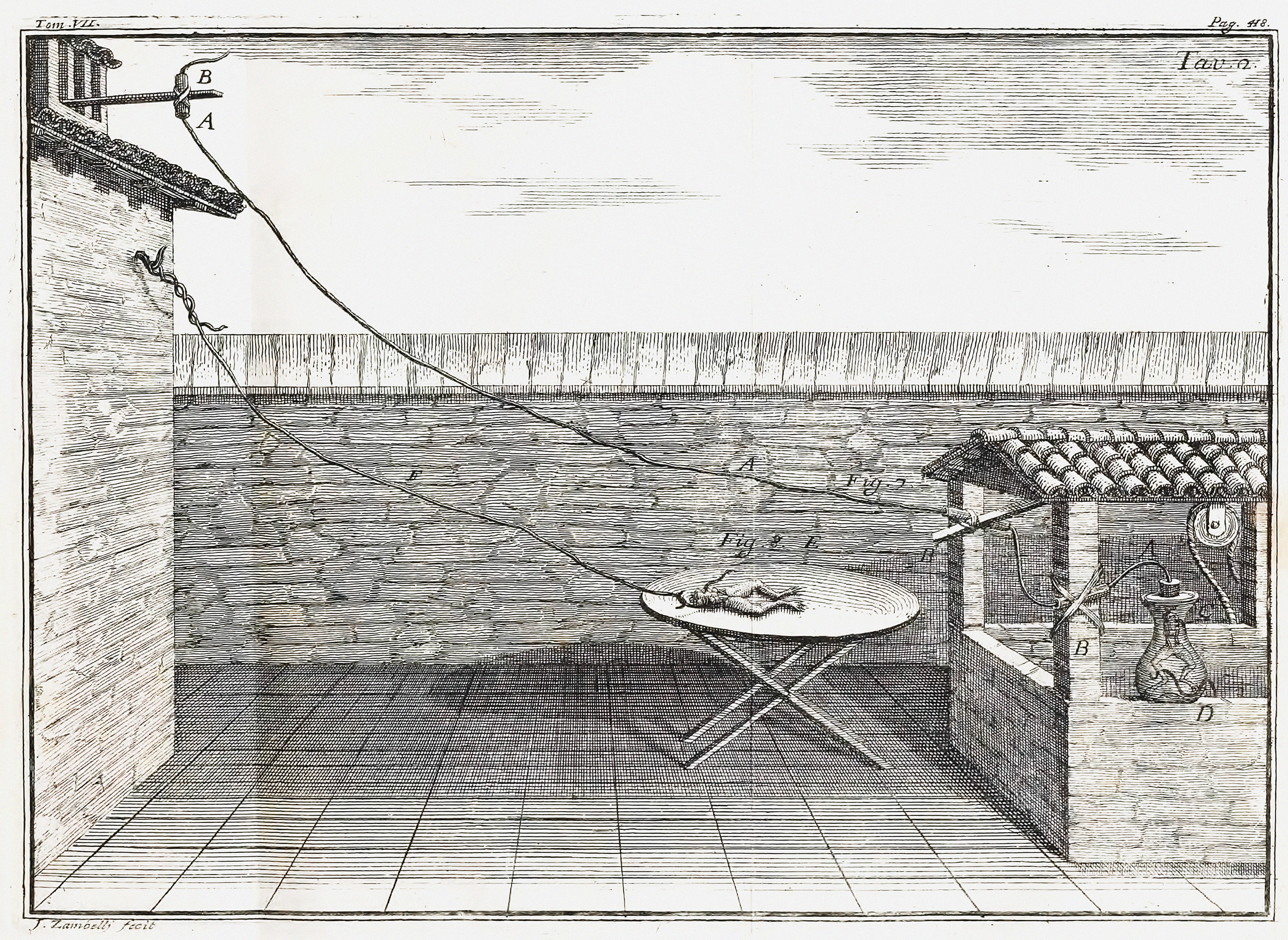
Late 1780s diagram of Galvani's experiment on frog legs

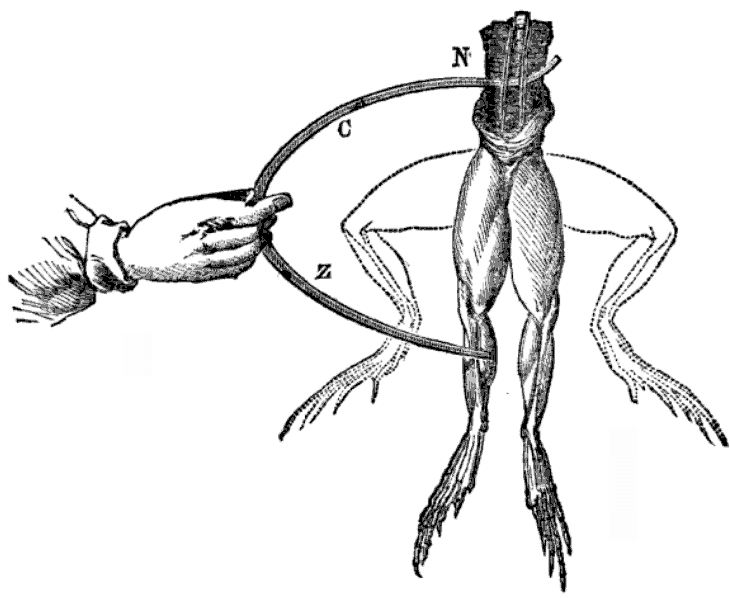
Electrodes touch a frog, and the legs twitch into the upward position

=== Nineteenth century ===
In 1800, Alexander von Humboldt joined a group of indigenous people who went fishing with horses, some thirty of which they chased into the water. The pounding of the horses' hooves, he noted, drove the electric eels, up to five feet (1.5 metres) long, out of the mud and prompted them to attack, rising out of the water and using their electricity to shock the horses. He saw two horses stunned by the shocks and then drowned. The electric eels, having given many shocks, "now require long rest and plenty of nourishment to replace the loss of galvanic power they have suffered", "swam timidly to the bank of the pond", and were easily caught using small harpoons on ropes.

In 1839, the chemist Michael Faraday extensively tested the electrical properties of an electric eel imported from Suriname. For a span of four months, he measured the electrical impulses produced by the animal by pressing shaped copper paddles and saddles against the specimen. Through this method, he determined and quantified the direction and magnitude of electric current, and proved that the animal's impulses were electrical by observing sparks and deflections on a galvanometer. He observed the electric eel increasing the shock by coiling about its prey, the prey fish "representing a diameter" across the coil. He likened the quantity of electric charge released by the fish to "the electricity of a Leyden battery of fifteen jars, containing 3500 square inches of glass coated on both sides, charged to its highest degree"

The German zoologist Carl Sachs was sent to Latin America by the physiologist Emil du Bois-Reymond, to study the electric eel; he took with him a galvanometer and electrodes to measure the fish's electric organ discharge, and used rubber gloves ("Kautschuck-Handschuhen") to enable him to catch the fish without being shocked, to the surprise of the local people. He published his research on the fish, including his discovery of what is now called Sachs' organ, in 1877.

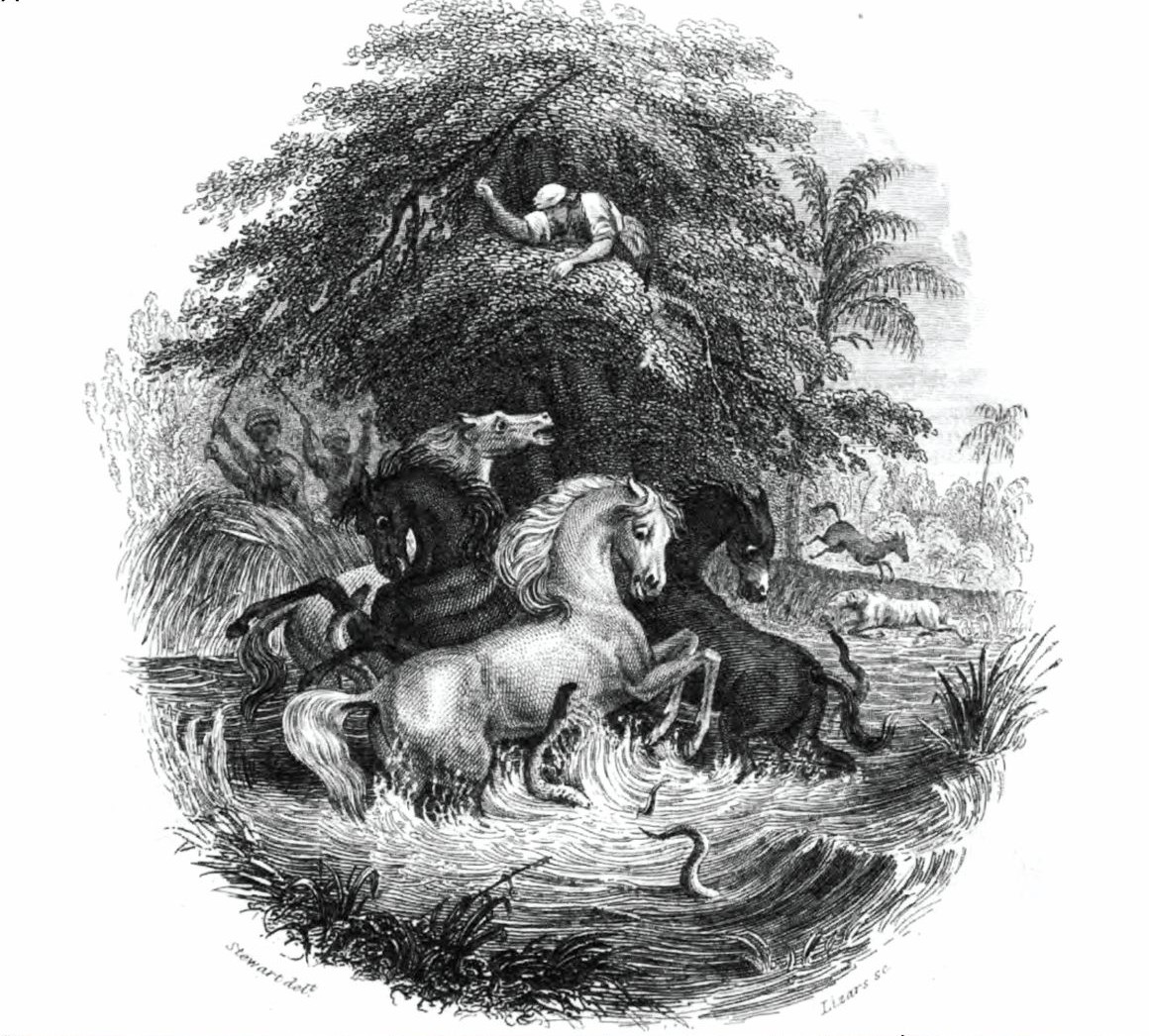
Artist's impression of Alexander von Humboldt's 1800 experience of hunting electric eels using a herd of horses, as told in his 1859 Journey to the Equinoctial Regions of the New Continent

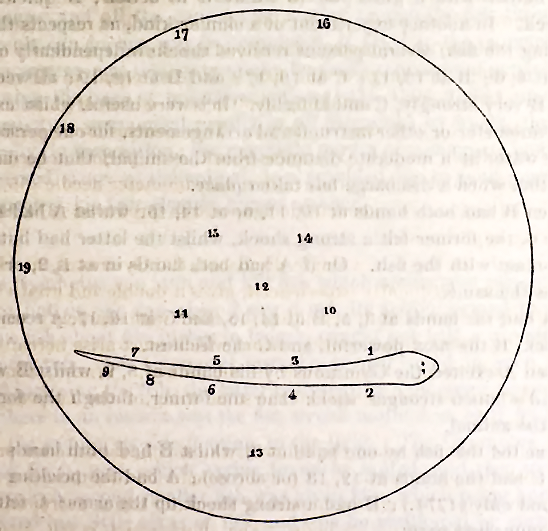
Michael Faraday's diagram of the setup for his "Experimental Researches in Electricity" on the electric eel, 1838. The fish is in a circular wooden tub in shallow water. He noted that the strongest shock was obtained when both hands or a pair of copper paddles were placed in the water, at positions 1 and 8, i.e. by the head and tail of the fish.

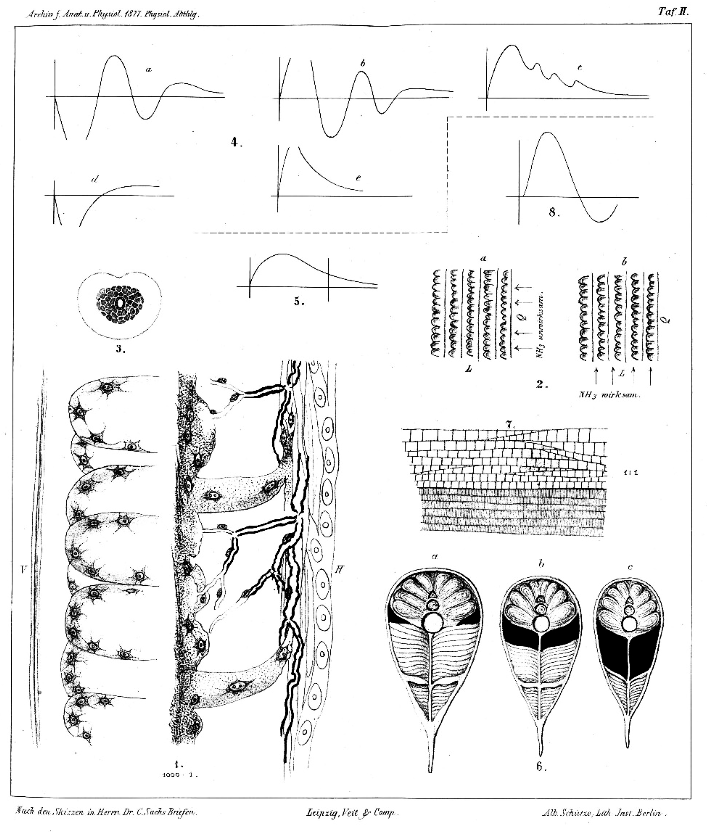
Carl Sachs's illustration of his discovery of Sachs's organ (shown in black at 6) in the electric eel, with electric discharge patterns (4, 5, 8), 1877

== Electroreception ==
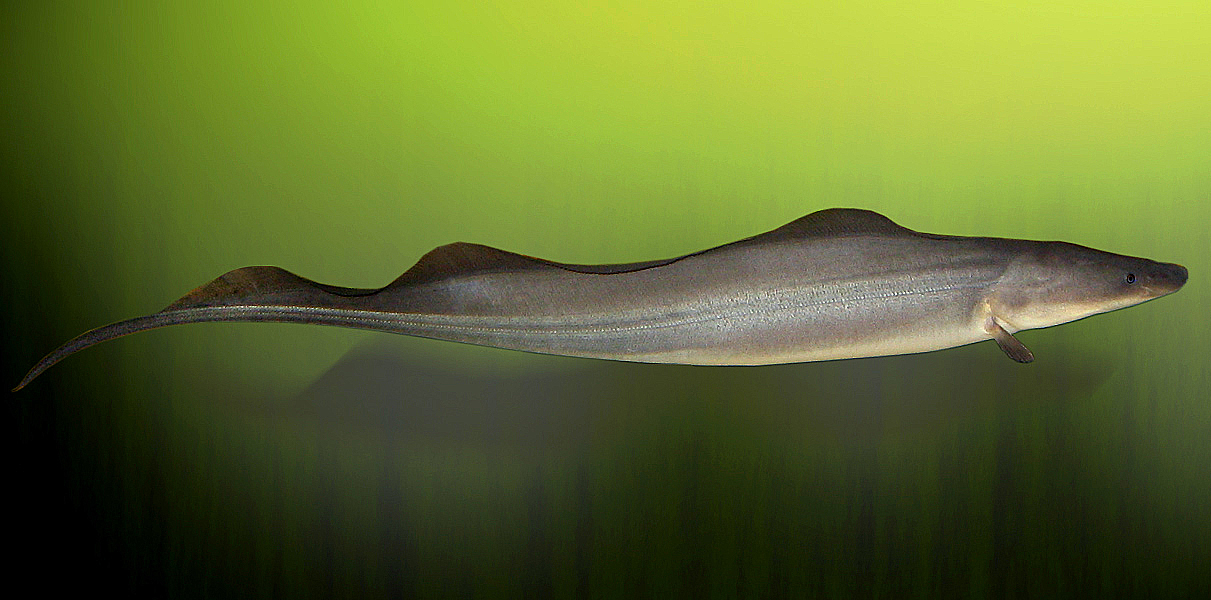
Hans Lissmann discovered electroreception in 1950 through his observations of Gymnarchus niloticus.

In 1678, while doing dissections of sharks, the Italian physician Stefano Lorenzini discovered organs on their heads, now called ampullae of Lorenzini. He published his findings in Osservazioni intorno alle torpedini. The electroreceptive function of these organs was established by R. W. Murray in 1960.

In 1921, the German anatomist Viktor Franz described the knollenorgans (tuberous organs) in the skin of the elephantfishes, again without knowledge of their function as electroreceptors.

In 1949, the Ukrainian-British zoologist Hans Lissmann noticed that the African knife fish (Gymnarchus niloticus) was able to swim backwards at the same speed and with the same dexterity around obstacles as when it swam forwards, avoiding collisions. He demonstrated in 1950 that the fish was producing a variable electric field, and that the fish reacted to any change in the electric field around it.
