= Electric organ (fish) =

Organ in electric fish

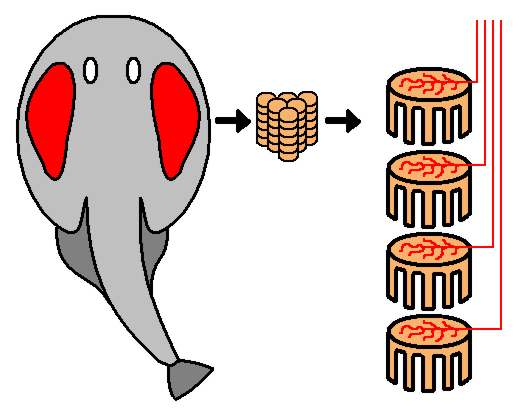
An electric ray (Torpediniformes) showing location of paired electric organs in the head, and electrocytes stacked within it

In biology, the electric organ is an organ that an electric fish uses to create an electric field. Electric organs are derived from modified muscle or in some cases nerve tissue, called electrocytes, and have evolved at least six times among the elasmobranchs and teleosts. These fish use their electric discharges for navigation, communication, mating, defence, and in strongly electric fish also for the incapacitation of prey.

The electric organs of two strongly electric fish, the torpedo ray and the electric eel, were first studied in the 1770s by John Walsh, Hugh Williamson, and John Hunter. Charles Darwin used them as an instance of convergent evolution in his 1859 On the Origin of Species. Modern study began with Hans Lissmann's 1951 study of electroreception and electrogenesis in Gymnarchus niloticus.

== Research history ==
Detailed descriptions of the powerful shocks that the electric catfish could give were written in ancient Egypt.

In the 1770s, the electric organs of the torpedo ray and electric eel were the subject of Royal Society papers by John Walsh, Hugh Williamson, and John Hunter, who discovered what is now called Hunter's organ. These appear to have influenced the thinking of Luigi Galvani and Alessandro Volta – the founders of electrophysiology and electrochemistry.

In the 19th century, Charles Darwin discussed the electric organs of the electric eel and the torpedo ray in his 1859 book On the Origin of Species as a likely example of convergent evolution: "But if the electric organs had been inherited from one ancient progenitor thus provided, we might have expected that all electric fishes would have been specially related to each other…I am inclined to believe that in nearly the same way as two men have sometimes independently hit on the very same invention, so natural selection, working for the good of each being and taking advantage of analogous variations, has sometimes modified in very nearly the same manner two parts in two organic beings". In 1877, Carl Sachs studied the fish, discovering what is now called Sachs' organ.

The electric eel's three electric organs – the main organ, Sachs's organ, and Hunter's organ – occupy much of its body, as was discovered in the 1770s. They can discharge weakly for electrolocation, as in other gymnotids, and strongly to stun prey.

Since the 20th century, electric organs have received extensive study, for example, in Hans Lissmann's pioneering 1951 paper on Gymnarchus and his review of their function and evolution in 1958. More recently, Torpedo californica electrocytes were used in the first sequencing of the acetylcholine receptor by Noda and colleagues in 1982, while Electrophorus electrocytes served in the first sequencing of the voltage-gated sodium channel by Noda and colleagues in 1984.

== Anatomy ==
=== Organ location ===
In most electric fish, the electric organs are oriented to fire along the length of the body, usually lying along the length of the tail and within the fish's musculature, as in the elephantnose fish and other Mormyridae. However, in two marine groups, the stargazers and the torpedo rays, the electric organs are oriented along the dorso-ventral (up-down) axis. In the torpedo ray, the organ is near the pectoral muscles and gills. The stargazer's electric organs lie behind the eyes. In the electric catfish, the organs are located just below the skin and encase most of the body like a sheath.

The elephantnose fish is a mormyrid with the electric organ in its tail.

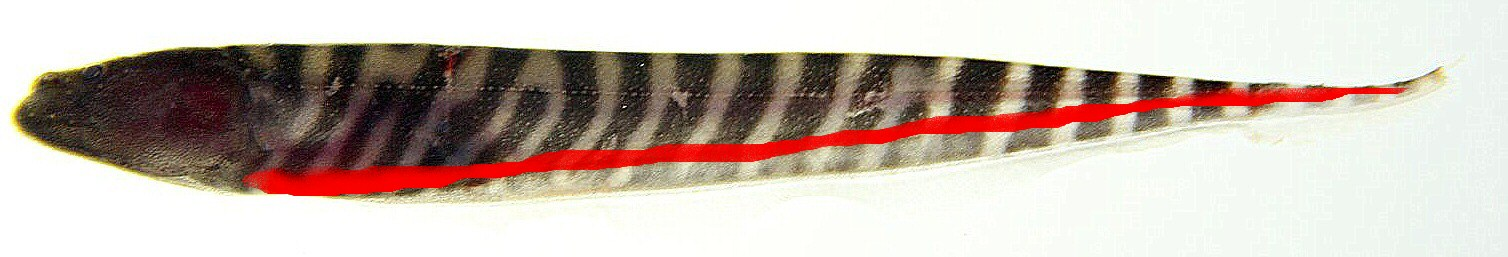
Location of electric organ in a Gymnotus species. The organ is not homologous with that of the Mormyridae.

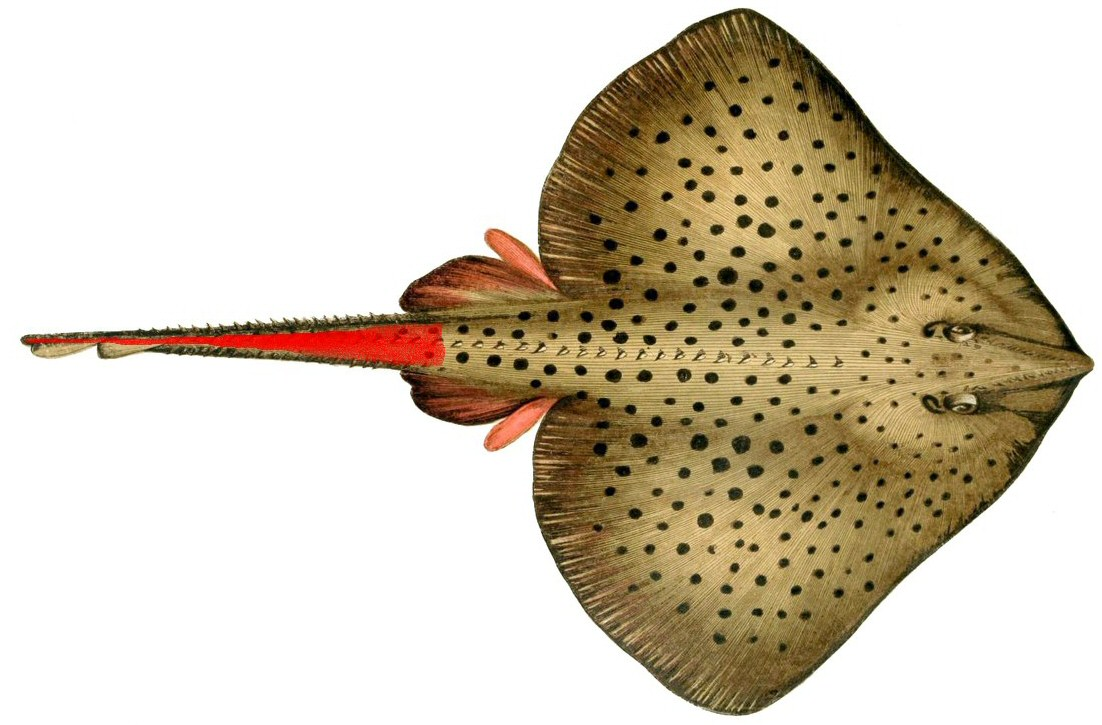
Skates (Raja montagui shown) have their electric organ in the tail.

An electric catfish's electric organ forms a sheath around much of the body.

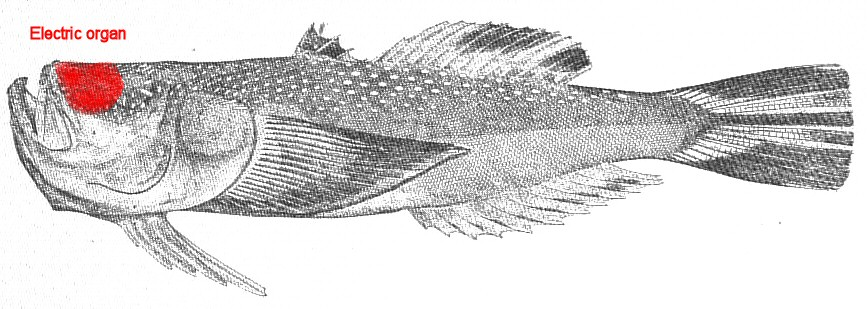
Stargazers like Astroscopus y-graecum have the electric organ in the head, arranged vertically.

=== Organ structure ===
Electric organs are composed of stacks of specialised cells that generate electricity. These are variously called electrocytes, electroplaques or electroplaxes. In some species they are cigar-shaped; in others, they are flat disk-like cells. Electric eels have stacks of several thousands of these cells, each cell producing 0.15 V. The cells function by pumping sodium and potassium ions across their cell membranes via transport proteins, consuming adenosine triphosphate (ATP) in the process. Postsynaptically, electrocytes work much like muscle cells, depolarising with an inflow of sodium ions, and repolarising afterwards with an outflow of potassium ions; but electrocytes are much larger and do not contract. They have nicotinic acetylcholine receptors.

The stack of electrocytes has long been compared to a voltaic pile, and may even have inspired the 1800 invention of the battery, since the analogy was already noted by Alessandro Volta.

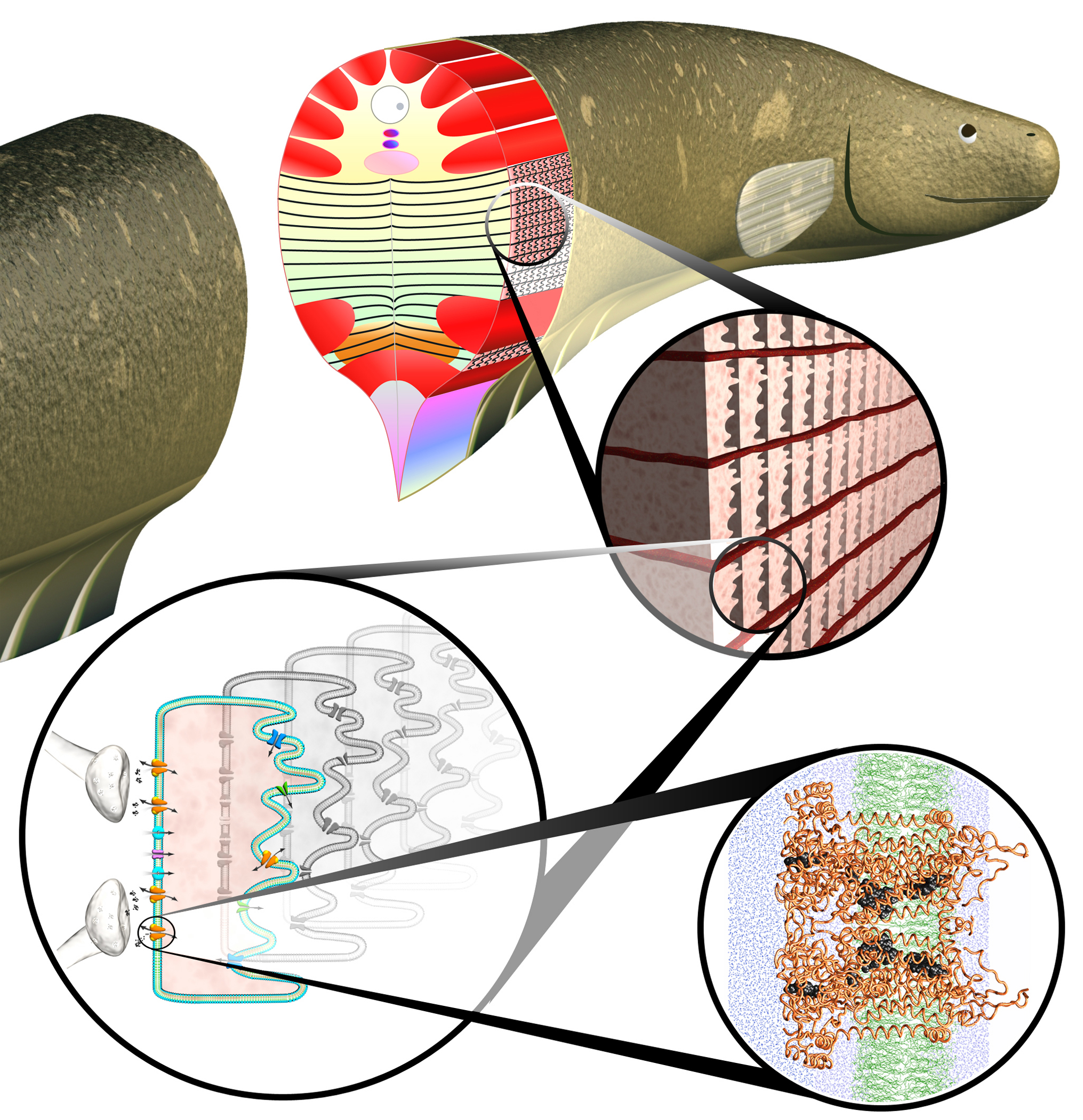
Electric eel anatomy: first detail shows electric organs, made of stacks of electrocytes. Second detail shows an individual cell with ion channels and pumps through the cell membrane; A nerve cell's terminal buttons are releasing neurotransmitters to trigger electrical activity. Final detail shows coiled protein chains of an ion channel.

== Evolution ==
Electric organs have evolved at least six times in various teleost and elasmobranch fish. Notably, they have convergently evolved in the African Mormyridae and South American Gymnotidae groups of electric fish. The two groups are distantly related, as they shared a common ancestor before the supercontinent Gondwana split into the American and African continents, leading to the divergence of the two groups. A whole-genome duplication event in the teleost lineage allowed for the neofunctionalization of the voltage-gated sodium channel gene Scn4aa which produces electric discharges. Early research pointed to convergence between lineages, but more recent genomic research is more nuanced. Comparative transcriptomics of the Mormyroidea, Siluriformes, and Gymnotiformes lineages conducted by Liu (2019) concluded that although there is no parallel evolution of entire transcriptomes of electric organs, there are a significant number of genes that exhibit parallel gene expression changes from muscle function to electric organ function at the level of pathways.

The electric organs of all electric fish are derived from skeletal muscle, an electrically excitable tissue, except in Apteronotus (Latin America), where the cells are derived from neural tissue. The original function of the electric organ has not been fully established in most cases; the organ of the African freshwater catfish genus Synodontis is however known to have evolved from sound-producing muscles.

Electrocytes evolved from an existing excitable tissue, skeletal muscle. Electrocytes are assembled into stacks to create larger voltages (and into multiple stacks to create larger currents, not shown). Electric fish may have diphasic discharges (as shown), or discharges of other kinds.

== Electric organ discharge ==
Electric organ discharges (EODs) need to vary with time for electrolocation, whether with pulses, as in the Mormyridae, or with waves, as in the Torpediniformes and Gymnarchus, the African knifefish. Many electric fishes also use EODs for communication, while strongly electric species use them for hunting or defence. Their electric signals are often simple and stereotyped, and the same on every occasion.

Electric organ discharge is controlled by the medullary command nucleus, a nucleus of pacemaker neurons in the brain. Electromotor neurons release acetylcholine to the electrocytes. The electrocytes fire an action potential using their voltage-gated sodium channels on one side, or in some species on both sides.

Electrolocation and discharge patterns of electric fishes
Group	Habitat	Electro- location	Discharge	Type	Waveform	Spike/wave duration	Voltage
Rajidae; Skates	Saltwater	Active	Weak	Pulse		200 ms	0.5 V
Mormyridae; Elephantfishes	Freshwater	Active	Weak	Pulse		1 ms	0.5 V
Gymnarchus; African knifefish	Freshwater	Active	Weak	Wave		3 ms	< 5 V
Gymnotus; Banded knifefish	Freshwater	Active	Weak	Pulse		2 ms	< 5 V
Eigenmannia; Glass knifefish	Freshwater	Active	Weak	Wave		5 ms	100 mV
Torpediniformes; Electric rays	Saltwater	Active	Weak, strong	Wave		10 ms	8 - 220 V
Electrophorus; Electric eels	Freshwater	Active	Strong	Pulse		2 ms	600 V
Malapteruridae; Electric catfishes	Freshwater	Active	Strong	Pulse		2 ms	350 V
Uranoscopidae; Stargazers	Saltwater	None	Strong	Pulse		10 ms	5 V

== In fiction ==
The ability to produce electricity is central to Naomi Alderman's 2016 science fiction novel The Power. In the book, women develop the ability to release electrical jolts from their fingers, powerful enough to stun or kill. The novel references the ability of fish such as the electric eel to give powerful shocks, the electricity being generated in a specially modified strip or skein of striated muscle across the girls' collarbones.

The poet and author Anna Keeler's short story "In the Arms of an Electric Eel" imagines a girl who, unlike an electric eel, does feel the electric shocks she generates. Agitated and depressed, she unintentionally burns herself to death with her own electricity.
