= Medullary command nucleus =

The medullary command nucleus (MCN), also called the pacemaker nucleus, is a group of nerve cells found in the bodies of weakly electric fish. It controls the function of electrocytes by regulating the frequency of electrical impulses. Signals originating in the MCN are transmitted to electrocytes, where changes in ion concentration cause electrical charges to be generated. The nucleus both sends and receives signals, thereby acting as a regulator and central processor for the electro sensors in the fish's body. Inputs into the MCN originate in the mesencephalic precommand nucleus, thalamic dorsal posterior nucleus, and toral ventroposterior nucleus. All of these nuclei have dense projections into the MCN, with the exception of the Toral Ventroposterior nucleus, which contain only a ventral edge projection.

== See also ==
- Electric organ
- Electric fish
