= Calabozo Airport =

Airport in Venezuela

Calabozo Airport Aeropuerto de Calabozo
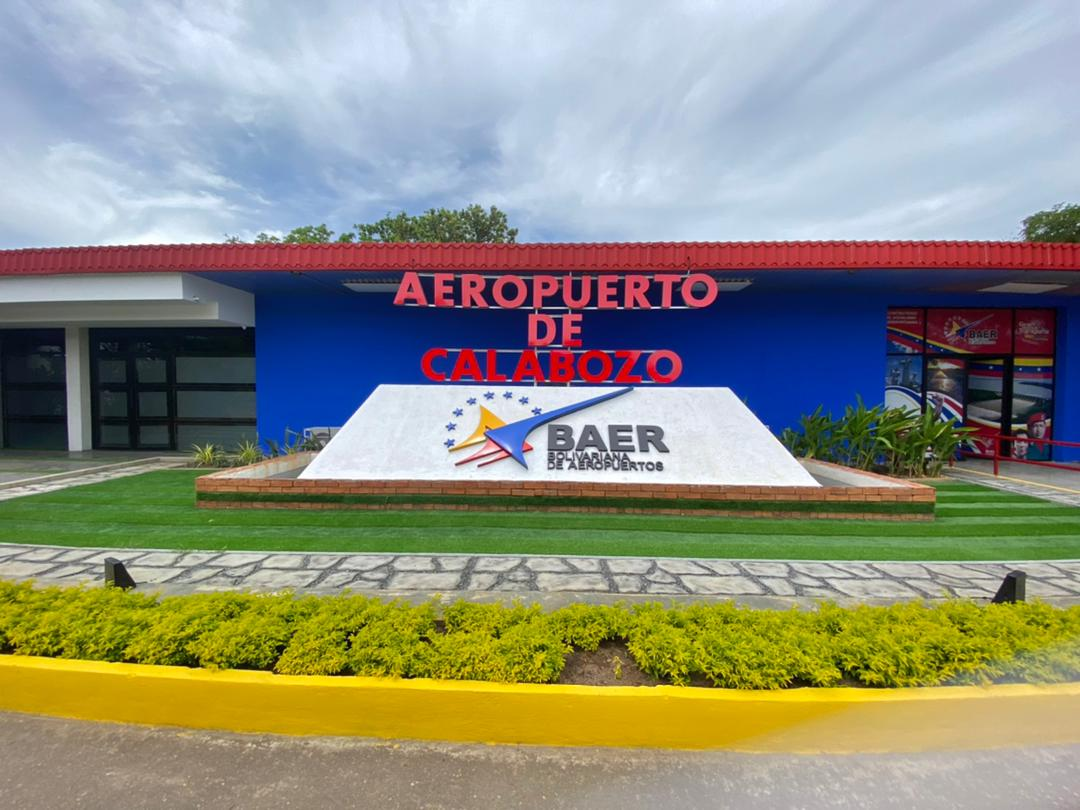
- IATA: CLZ; ICAO: SVCL

Summary
- Airport type: Public
- Operator: Government
- Serves: Calabozo, Venezuela
- Elevation AMSL: 328 ft / 100 m
- Coordinates: 8°55′30″N 67°25′00″W

Map
- Location of the airport in Venezuela

Runways
Direction	Length		Surface
Direction	m	ft	Surface
09/27	1,580	5,184	Asphalt
- Source: WAD GCM Google Maps

Calabozo Airport (Spanish: Aeropuerto de Calabozo) (IATA: CLZ, ICAO: SVCL) is an airport serving Calabozo, a town in Guárico state in Venezuela.

The Calabozo non-directional beacon (Ident: CZO) is located on the field.

== See also ==
- Transport in Venezuela
- List of airports in Venezuela
