= Aguaro-Guariquito National Park =

National park in Venezuela

Aguaro-Guariquito National Park Parque Nacional Aguaro-Guariquito
- IUCN category II (national park)
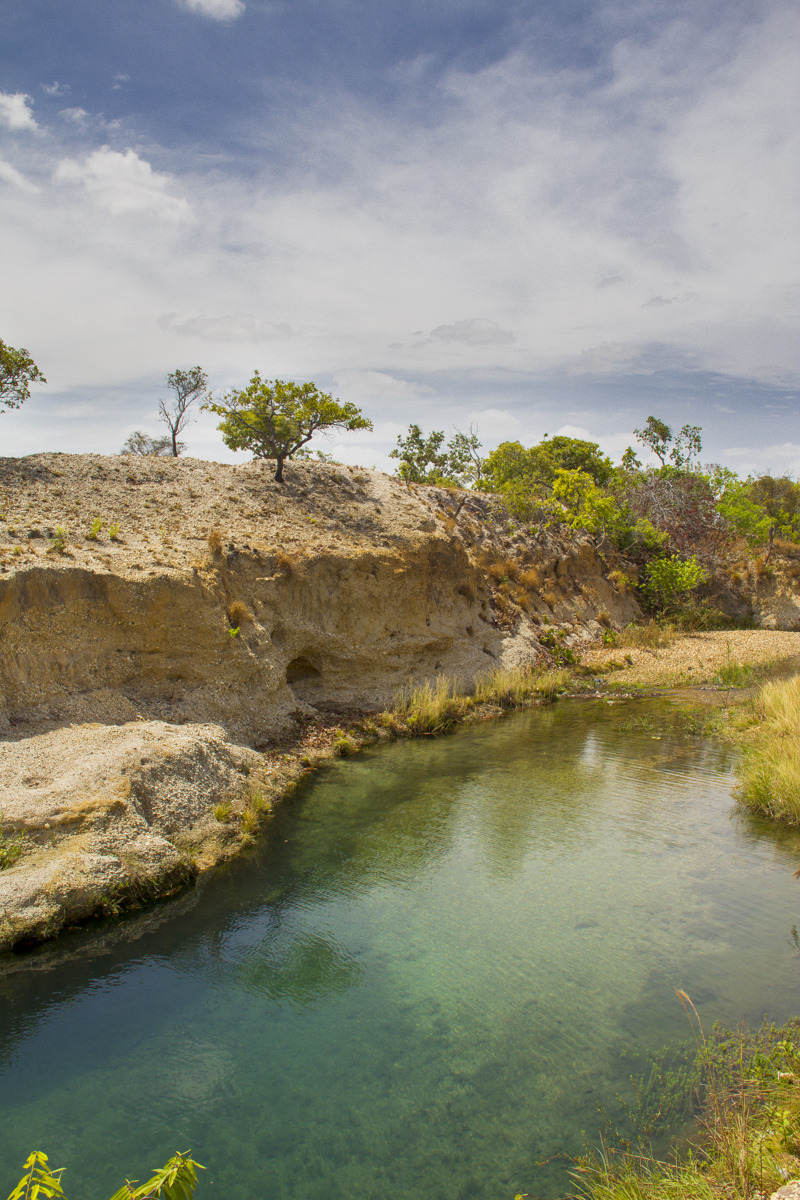

- Location within Venezuela
- Location: Venezuela
- Coordinates: 8°18′N 66°45′W
- Area: 5,857 km^{2} (2,261 sq mi)
- Established: March 7, 1974

The Aguaro-Guariquito National Park (Spanish: Parque nacional Aguaro-Guariquito), also rendered as Aguaro Guariquito National Park, is a protected area with the status of national park in the South American country of Venezuela. Located in the region of the Llanos, it extends over the municipalities of Francisco de Miranda and Jose Rondon (formerly Las Mercedes) in Guárico state.

It was established on March 7, 1974. It is spread over an area of 585,750 hectares (5857 km^{2}).

In 1974, the Venezuelan government, presided over by President Rafael Caldera, created the Aguaro-Guariquito National Park on an area of land located south of the Guárico State, in the jurisdiction of the municipalities Las Mercedes del Llano and Miranda. This large plain park comprises 569,000 ha.

It was therefore imperative that a sample of this natural formation be protected under the National Park regime, in order to preserve forever its original conditions for the benefit of present and future generations.

The climate is warm and presents two very marked seasons: the summer or drought, from November to March, the rainy or winter, which runs from April to October.

== Fauna ==
The Amazon river dolphin Inia geoffrensis can be found in the national park.

The national park is an Important Bird Area. Resident species include

- Rufous-vented chachalaca Ortalis ruficauda
- Yellow-knobbed curassow Crax daubentoni

== Gallery ==
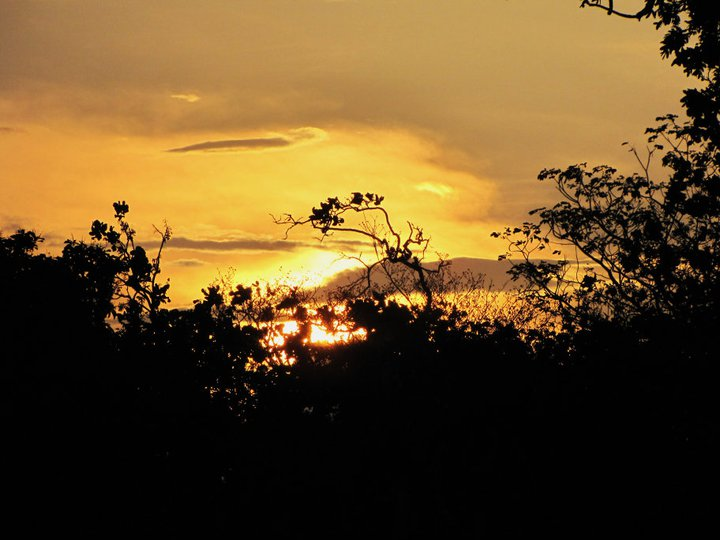

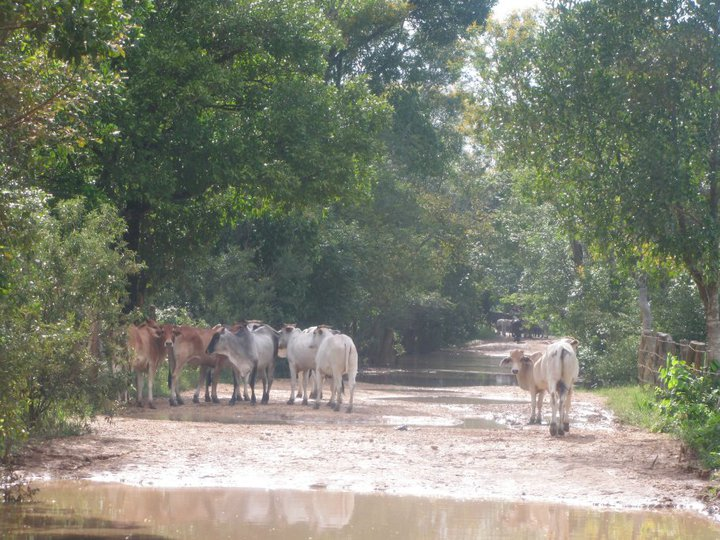

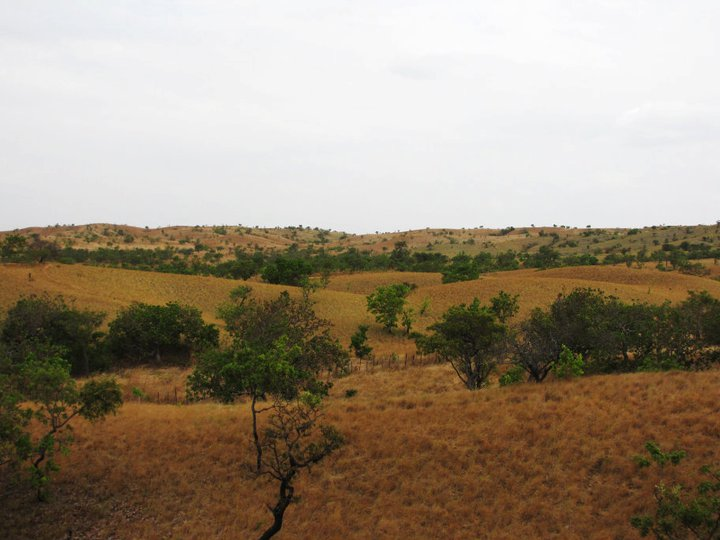

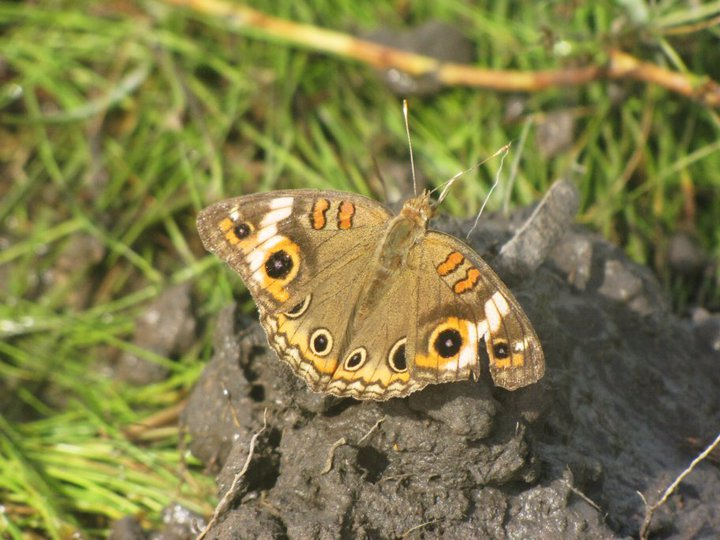

== See also ==
- List of national parks of Venezuela
- Los Roques National Park
