= Carl Sachs =

German zoologist

Carl Sachs (19 September 1853 – 18 August 1878) was a German zoologist, known for his discovery of what is now called Sachs' organ in the electric eel.

== Biography ==
Carl Sachs was born in Neisse (now in Poland). He was sent to Latin America by the physiologist Emil du Bois-Reymond, to study the electric eel (Electrophorus) in the same Llanos region where Humboldt had made his observations; he took with him a galvanometer and electrodes to measure the fish's electric organ discharge, and used rubber gloves ("Kautschuck-Handschuhen") to enable him to catch the fish without being shocked, to the surprise of the local people. He published his research on the fish, including his discovery of what is now called Sachs' organ, in 1877.

While in the Llanos, he used giant toads instead of the frogs that du Bois-Reymond's laboratory normally employed to detect electrical activity from electric fish. Sachs studied the electric eel's seeming immunity to its own shocks, and to electricity applied to it. He found that electric eel muscles, when removed from the fish, twitched in the usual way in response to an electric shock. He demonstrated that a discharge could be triggered by stimulating the nerve to the electric organs; and that such a discharge could be blocked with the arrow poison curare. He observed that electric eels gather in groups as water levels fall in the dry season.

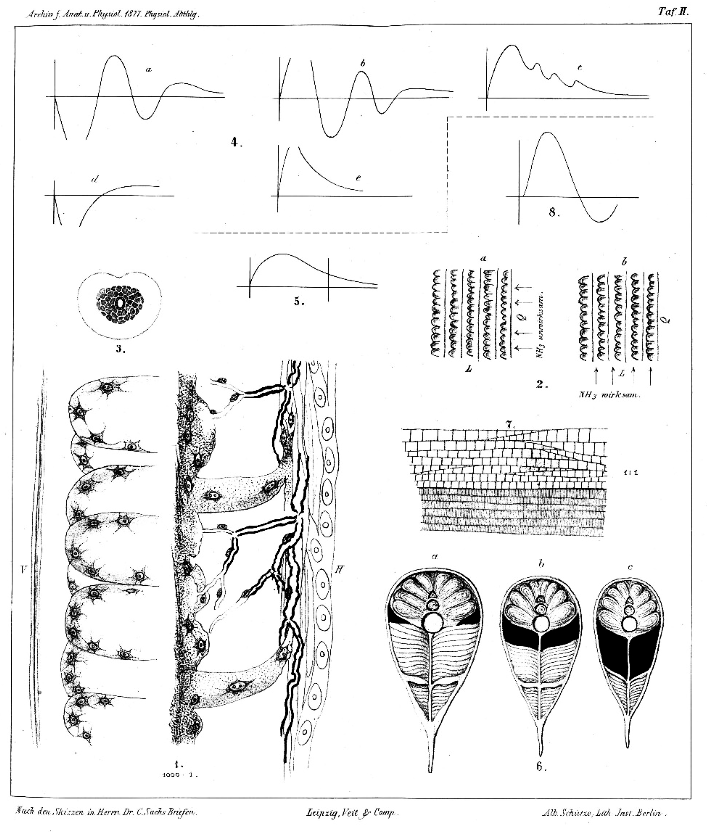
Sachs' illustration of what is now called Sachs's organ (in black at 6) in the electric eel, with electric organ discharge patterns (4, 5, 8), 1877

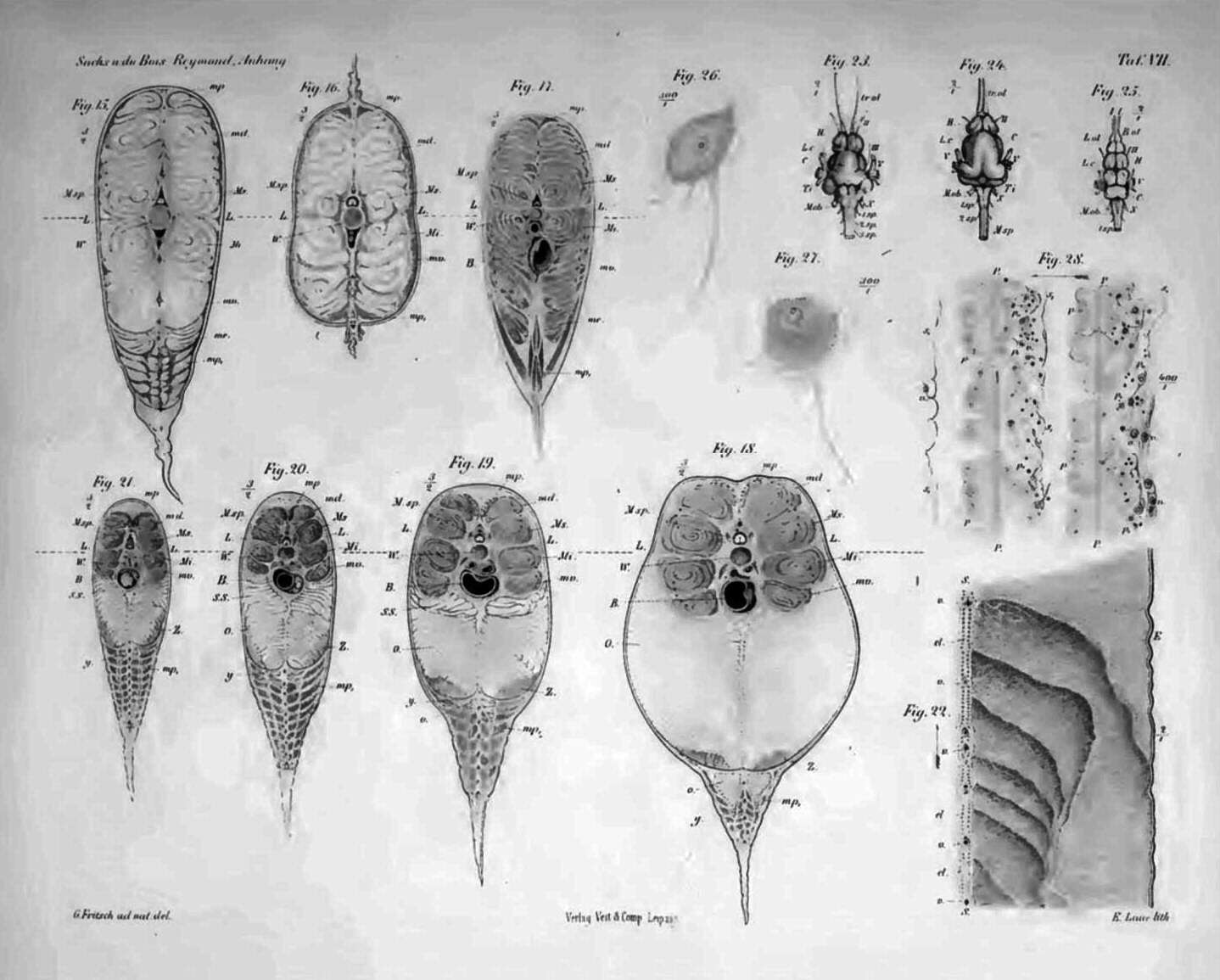
Sections and anatomy of electric eel, published posthumously by Sach's employer, Emil du Bois-Reymond, in 1881

Sachs produced an accurate anatomical description of "Sachs's organ", the smallest of the electric eel's three electric organs. He tried to bring six of the fish home on his return journey across the Atlantic, but one died on the voyage back to the port of Bremen, and the rest were harmed on the train journey to Berlin. Accordingly his researches on these specimens were limited to anatomy. The organ is now known to produce a low-voltage discharge used in electrolocation.

He was the first person to write descriptions of the electric organs of the weakly electric Gymnotus fishes, members of the same family as the electric eel.

Sachs died aged 25 in 1878, not long after returning to Europe, in an accident on Monte Cevedale, Italy.

Anatomy of electric eel's three electric organs. The main organ produces a powerful shock used in hunting; Sachs's organ produces small discharges used in electrolocation; and Hunter's organ produces middling discharges that may prepare the fish for the main organ discharge.

== Works ==
- Sachs, Carl (1877). "Beobachtungen und versuche am südamerikanischen zitteraale (Gymnotus electricus)" [Observations and research on the South American electric eel (Gymnotus electricus)]. Archives of Anatomy and Physiology (in German): 66–95.
- Sachs, Carl (1879). Aus den Llanos. Schilderungen einer naturwissenschaftlichen Reise nach Wenezuela [From Llanos: Depictions of a Scientific Journey to Venezuela] (in German). Leipzig: Veit.
- du Bois-Reymond, Emil H.; Fritsch, Gustav; Sachs, Carl (1881). Untersuchungen am Zitteraal: gymnotus electricus / Carl Sachs; nach seinem Tode bearbeitet von Emil Du Bois-Reymond; mit zwei Abhandlungen von Gustav Fritsch [Investigations of the Electric Eel: Gymnotus electricus. By Carl Sachs, written up after his death by Emil du Bois-Reymond; with two contributions by Gustav Fritsch] (in German). Leipzig: Veit.
