= Guárico River =

Coordinates: 7°52′52″N 67°25′43″W

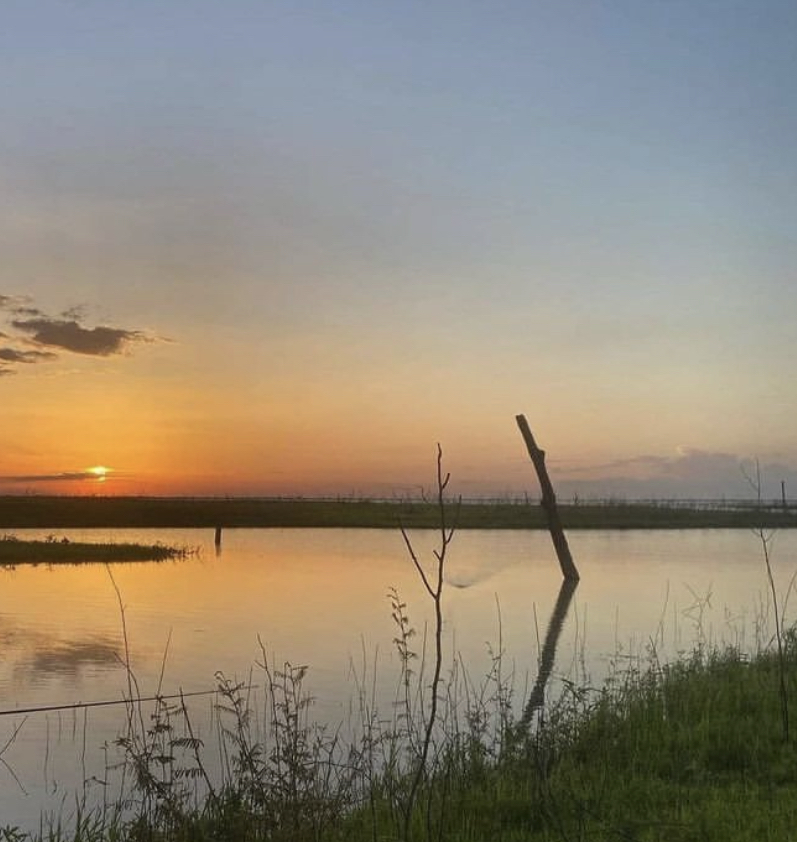

Location
- Country: Venezuela

Physical characteristics
- Mouth
  - location: Apure River
  - elevation: 770 m (2,530 ft)
- Length: 525 km (326 mi)
- Basin size: Orinoco

Guárico River is a river in Venezuela.
