= Delta Amacuro Federal Territory =

Venezuelan federal territory (1884–1991)

Delta Amacuro Federal Territory Territorio Federal Delta Amacuro
- Federal Territory of Venezuela
- 1884–1991
- Location of the Delta Amacuro Federal Territory (red) in Venezuela.
- Capital: Pedernales (1884–1887); Tucupita (1887–1991)
- Area
  - 1884: 65,649 km^{2} (25,347 sq mi)
- Population
  - 1884: 7,222
  - Type: Federal Territory of Venezuela
- History
  - Established: 27 April 1884
  - Statehood: 3 August 1991
Preceded by	Succeeded by
Bolívar State	Delta Amacuro

The Delta Federal Territory, later Delta Amacuro, is the name by which the current Delta Amacuro State of Venezuela was known until 1991.

== History ==
The origins of the Delta Amacuro Federal Territory date back to the Piacoa canton of the Guayana Province, which covered an area similar to the current state; The Orinoco Delta was segregated from Guyana State on 27 April 1884, and a territory called Delta Federal Territory was formed with capital in the city of Pedernales; the capital was transferred to Tucupita (founded in 1848) on 14 November 1887; the limits for the federal territory were the following:

To the north and east, the Gulf of Paria and the Atlantic Ocean; to the west the dividing line between what were the State of Guayana and Maturín; to the south the Yuruary Territory, and to the southeast English Guiana.

On 21 October 1893, General Manuel Guzmán Álvarez decreed the elimination of the "Delta Federal Territory", incorporating its area into the Bolívar State. On 26 April 1901, General Cipriano Castro, provisional president of the United States of Venezuela, decreed the recreation of the territory with the name "Delta Amacuro Federal Territory" and designated San José de Amacuro as its capital. Four years later, on 16 May 1905, the capital was moved to Tucupita.

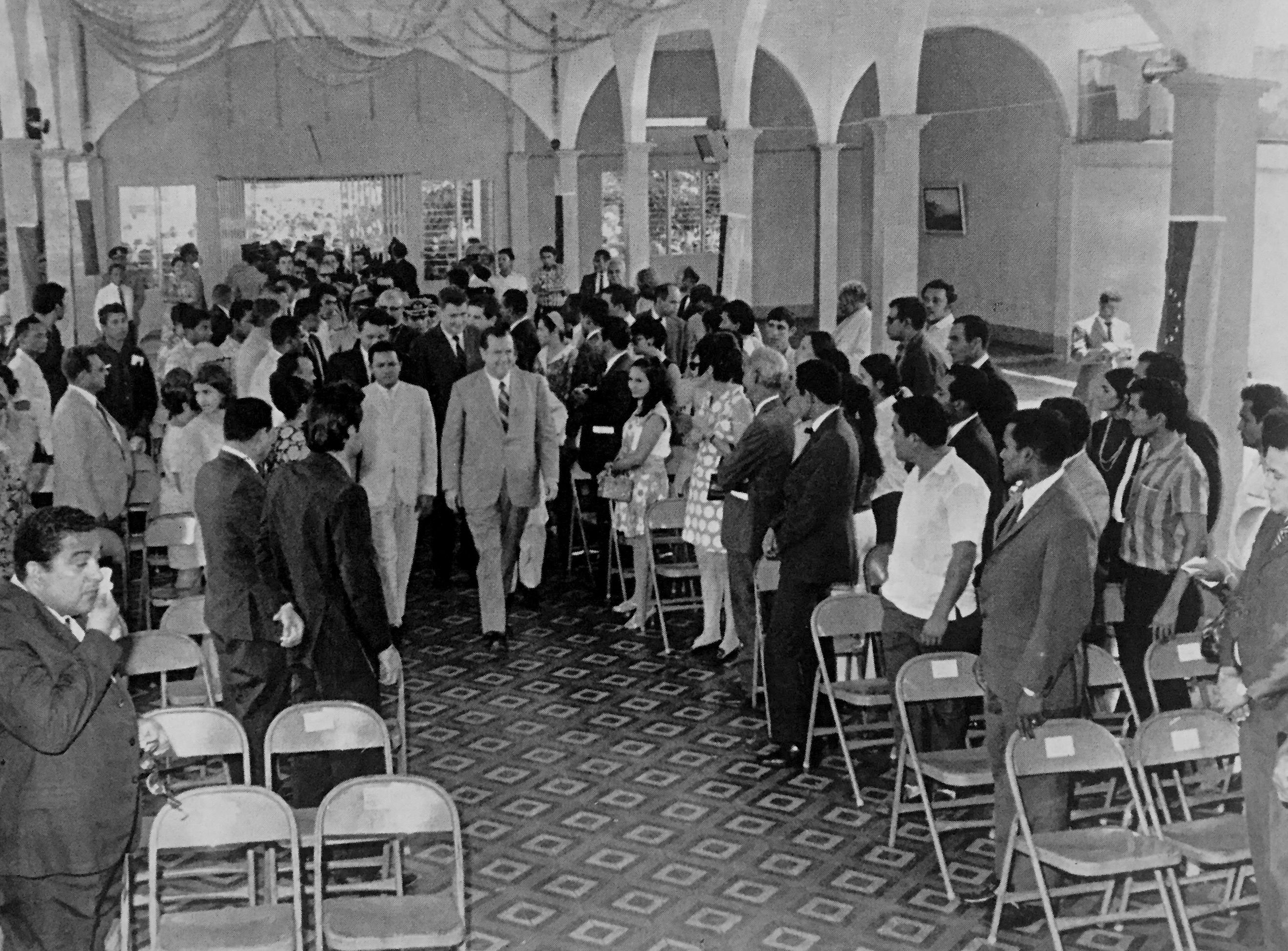
Visit of President Rafael Caldera to the Municipal Council of Tucupita in 1970.

In 1905 the territory was divided into six municipalities: Amacuro, Curiapo, El Toro, Pedernales and Piacoa. In 1936 it was subdivided into departments, these being Amacuro, Antonio Díaz, Pedernales and Tucupita, which were reduced in 1940 to those of Antonio Díaz, Pedernales and Tucupita. The category of Federal Territory was maintained until 3 August 1991, when by decree of the Congress of the Republic it was converted into the Delta Amacuro State.

== Territorial division ==
The Delta Amacuro Federal Territory was divided into departments for its administration; towards the end of the territory's existence these were:

- Tucupita Department, with capital in Tucupita.
- Pedernales Department, with capital en Pedernales.
- Antonio Díaz Department, con capital en Curiapo.

== See also ==
- Administrative divisions of Venezuela
