= Amazonas Federal Territory =

Venezuelan federal territory (1864–1992)

Amazonas Federal Territory Territorio Federal Amazonas
- Federal Territory of Venezuela
- 1864–1992
- Location of the Amazonas Federal Territory (red) in Venezuela.
- Capital: San Fernando de Atabapo (1864–1924); Maroa (1881–1893); Puerto Ayacucho (1924–1991)
- Area
  - 1881: 350,000 km^{2} (140,000 sq mi)
- Population
  - 1881: 45,200
- Government
  - Type: Federal Territory of Venezuela
- History
  - Established: 1864
  - Statehood: 23 July 1992
Preceded by	Succeeded by
Amazonas Province	Amazonas State

The Amazonas Federal Territory is the name by which the current Amazonas State of Venezuela was known until 1992.

== History ==
The origins of the Amazon Federal Territory date back to the Río Negro canton of the Guayana Province, which covered an area similar to the current state and part of the Colombian departments of Vichada and Guainía, and with capital in San Fernando de Atabapo.

In 1856, it was decided to elevate this canton into a province separate from that of Guayana with the name of Province of Amazonas. When the Federal Revolution came to power under the command of Juan Crisóstomo Falcón in 1864, the name was changed to Amazonas Federal Territory made up of the departments of San Fernando de Atabapo, San Carlos and Maroa.

The political-administrative changes promoted by Antonio Guzmán Blanco, meant that from 1881 to 1893 said territory was divided into two; the Amazonas Federal Territory with capital in Maroa, and the Alto Orinoco Federal Territory retaining San Fernando de Atabapo as capital. In 1893, the name "Amazon Federal Territory" was resumed with capital again in San Fernando de Atabapo until 1928, when it was decided to move the capital to Puerto Ayacucho to make it more accessible to the rest of Venezuela. On 23 July 1992, the Congress of the Republic, currently the National Assembly, elevated the category of Federal Territory to state.

== Territorial division ==
The Amazonas Federal Territory was divided into departments for its administration; towards the end of the territory's existence these were:

- Atabapo Department, with capital in San Fernando de Atabapo.
- Atures Department, with capital in Puerto Ayacucho.
- Casiquiare Department, with capital in Maroa.
- Río Negro Department, with capital in San Carlos.

== See also ==
- Administrative divisions of Venezuela
