= Cathedral of the Divine Shepherdess =

- Catedral de la Divina Pastora de Tucupita
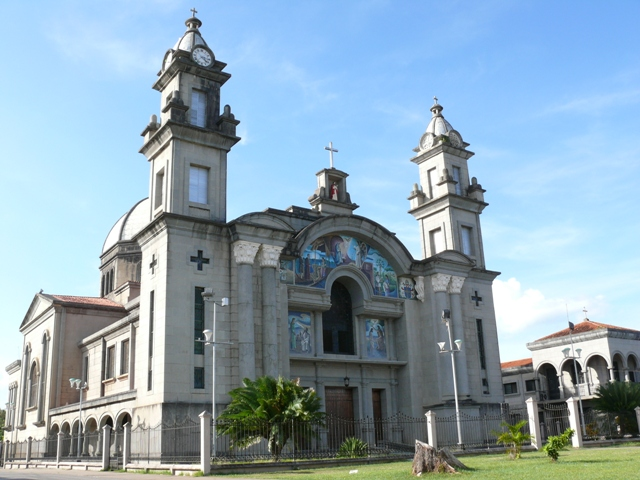
- Cathedral of the Divine Shepherdess
- 9.06032°N 62.05038°W
- Location: Tucupita
- Country: Venezuela
- Denomination: Roman Catholic Church

The Cathedral of the Divine Shepherdess or Tucupita Cathedral (Spanish: Catedral de la Divina Pastora de Tucupita) is a religious building that is affiliated with the Catholic Church and serves as the seat of the Apostolic Vicariate of Tucupita (Vicariatus Apostolicus Tucupitensis) created on July 30, 1954, by bull Crescit in dies of Pope Pius XII, and it works in the city of Tucupita, Delta Amacuro state capital at the eastern end of the South American country of Venezuela. It is specifically located between Marino, La Paz and Arismendi Avenue streets.

It is dedicated to the Virgin Mary under the title Divina Pastora (as the mother of the Good Shepherd), which is, together with the Virgin of Coromoto, one of the most famous Marian titles in Venezuela. Although the processions of the Divine Shepherdess usually occur in Lara state in western central Venezuela, the cathedral of the city is dedicated to the Virgen del Carmen, while Tucupita choose to honor the Divine Shepherdess, one of the symbols of Catholicism in Venezuela.

The temple follows the Roman or Latin rite and is under the pastoral care of Bishop José Romero Ernesto Rivas. The internal space is 1,352 sqm (52 m long by 26 m wide) with 2 towers and a maximum height of 32 meters. Its construction began in 1957 and would not be completed until 1982.

== See also ==
- Roman Catholicism in Venezuela
- Caracas Cathedral
