= Night of the Machetes =

Massacre in Venezuela

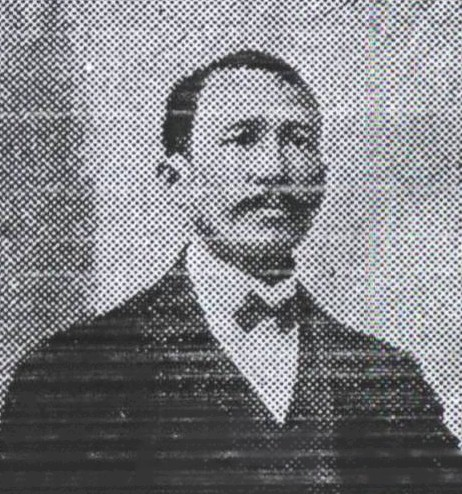
Tomás Funes.

The Night of the Machetes (La noche de los machetes) was the name given to the massacre that occurred on May 8, 1913, in San Fernando de Atabapo, Venezuela, where the assassination of Amazonas Governor Roberto Pulido, his wife and his children took place, along with the killing of dozens or even hundreds of people, as well as the assault on the Government House of the Amazonas Federal Territory, carried out by colonel Tomás Funes and his henchmen. This marked the beginning of seven years of Funes' bloody de facto rule over Amazonas.

== Background ==
General Roberto Pulido's government in Amazonas was corrupt and controversial, as he was the majority shareholder of the Pulido Hermanos trading company, which dominated the extraction and trade of rubber in the region (San Fernando de Atabapo, the capital of Amazonas at the time, was rich in rubber). He combined his rubber businesses with state affairs.

At the beginning of the 20th century, the border between Venezuela and Colombia was neglected by the Colombian government. In the area, the use of force prevailed as a means of governance, which contributed to violent events like the Night of the Machetes and Funes' subsequent rule.

== History ==
When Pulido increased taxes on rubber entrepreneurs, Funes, a rubber trader from the Amazon region between Venezuela and Brazil, conspired in retaliation to overthrow him with help of his followers. Together, they forcibly seized the Government House of the Amazonas Federal Territory, located in San Fernando de Atabapo.

Among those killed were relatives, friends, employees, and officials of General Pulido. The exact number of murders remains uncertain: José Alberto Alcalde counted 65 deaths, José Eustasio Rivera wrote that they exceeded a hundred, while historian and former Amazonas Governor Bartolomé Tavera-Acosta mentioned 130 in his book Río Negro, reseña etnográfica, histórica y geográfica del Territorio Amazonas. Lina Marcela González Gómez, on the other hand, documented that there had been more than 400.

== Aftermath ==
This was one of the greatest challenges for the dictatorship of Juan Vicente Gómez, as Gómez not only had to accept Funes as the de facto ruler but also referred to him as a "decorous military man" and a "dutiful and loyal soldier," later appointing a candidate proposed by Funes as governor of Amazonas: Pérez Briceño.

Funes, known as the Devil of Río Negro, committed at least 480 murders during his rule, according to his own records, and enslaved Indigenous inhabitants of the region. There are records documenting the deaths of around 2,000 Makiritare Indigenous people due to his repressive actions.

Tomás Funes' de facto rule over Amazonas lasted seven years until his capture by Emilio Arévalo Cedeño. He was then tried, sentenced to death, and executed by firing squad in front of all the inhabitants.

== In popular culture ==
Writer Rómulo Gallegos mentioned the event in his novel Canaima (1935), describing it as "the night when the machetes lit up the Vichada."

== See also ==
- List of massacres in Venezuela
