= Maroa =

Maroa may refer to:

== Places ==
- United States
  - Maroa, Illinois
  - Maroa Township, Illinois
- Venezuela
  - Maroa, Venezuela
  - Maroa Municipality
- New Zealand
  - Maroa Caldera

== Entertainment ==
- Maroa (2006 film)

== Animals ==
- Maroa (moth), the synonym of a moth genus in the family Crambidae
