= Vehicle registration plates of Venezuela =

Bolivarian Republic of Venezuela
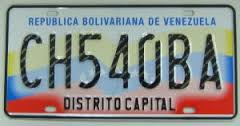
- Venezuelan regular legal standard number plate from Caracas.
- Country: Venezuela
- Country code: YV

Current series
- Size: 300 mm × 150 mm 11.8 in × 5.9 in
- Serial format: AB123CD (D being the regional code)
- Colour (front): Black on white, yellow, blue and red
- Colour (rear): Black on white, yellow, blue and red

Venezuela requires its residents to register their motor vehicles and display vehicle registration plates.

Current plates are North American standard 6 × 12 inches (152 × 300 mm).

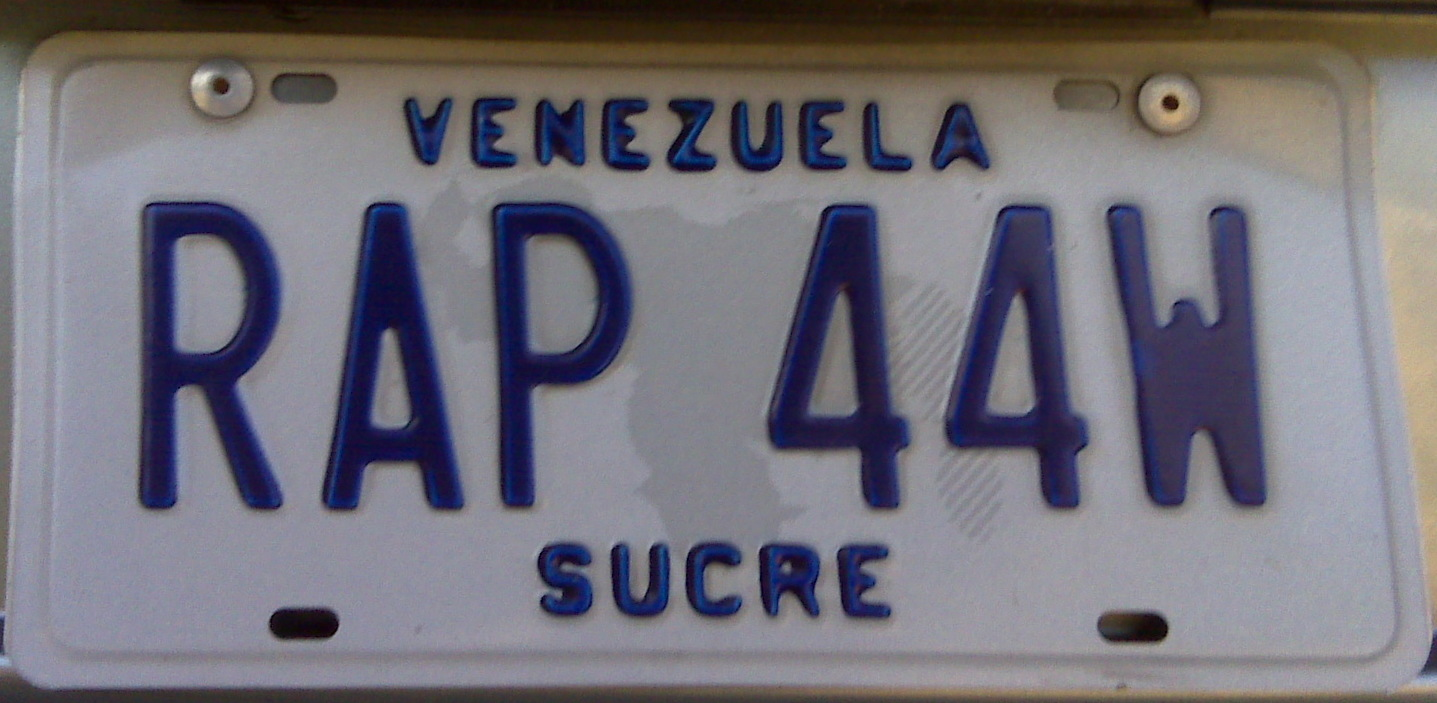
Car registration valid between 1997 and 2008.

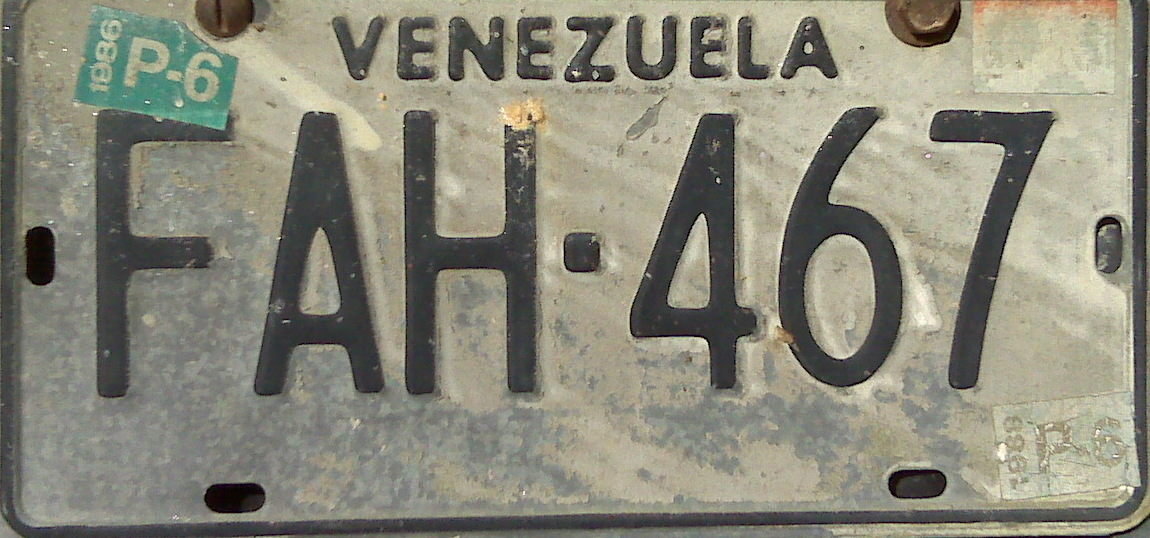
Car registration valid between 1982 and 1997.

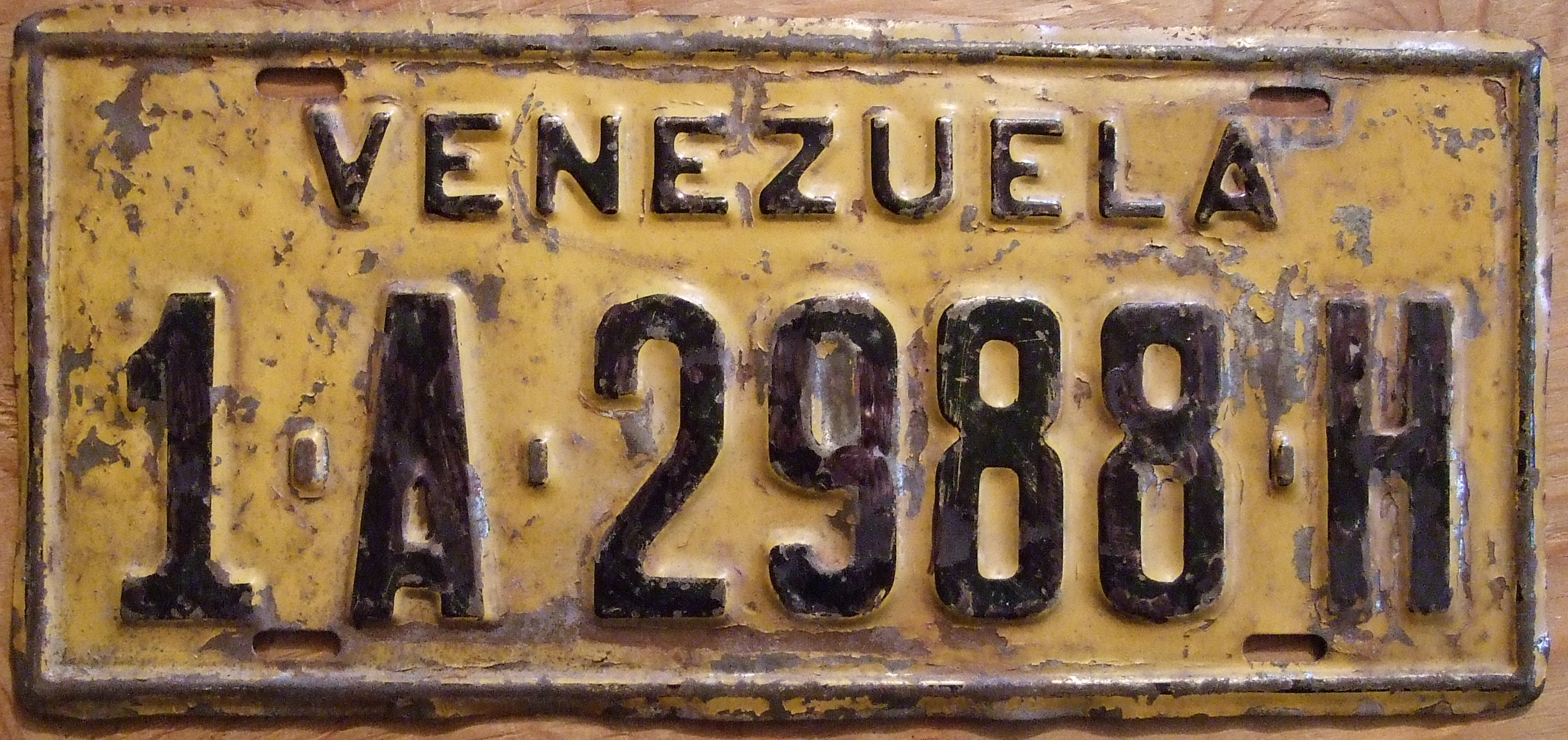
Car registration in force around 1955.

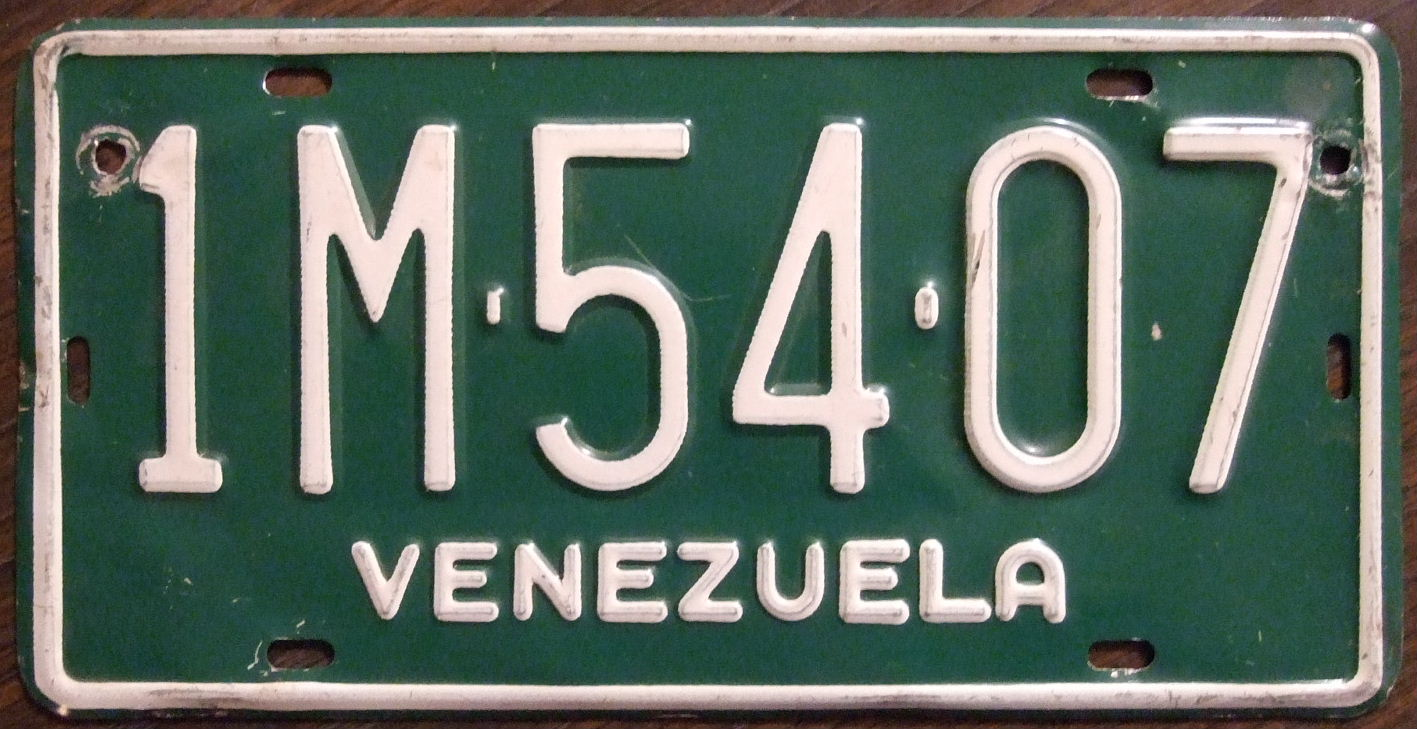
Current automobile license plate in 1950.

The car registration plates of Venezuela (also called placas) are distinctive used for the identification of all vehicles automotiveis that travel through the national communication channels. The coding system in force since 2008 establishes a serialization consisting of four letters and three numbers. Fees vary according to the type of transport and its specific use.

== Format ==
Venezuelan license plates have a serialization of four letters and three numbers, for a total of seven characters (AB123CD). The plates have a rectangular shape of 300 mm x 150 mm, (Note: In the case of motorcycles, 200mm x 150 mm. These measures are also valid alternatively for test vehicles, chassis, the Armed Forces and the Technical Corps of Surveillance of Traffic and Land Transportation. In the case of blood-drawn vehicles, they will be 180 mm x 90 mm.) framed with black borders and a white background on which an impression of the national flag has been superimposed. The alphanumeric serial is located in the center of the plate, whose sequence of digits will correspond to the type of vehicle. The legend Bolivarian Republic of Venezuela is inscribed in the upper part in blue, while the lower part will indicate the federal entity in which it is domiciled the owner of the vehicle. The last letter of the particular serial will indicate that same locality by code.

== Identification ==
=== According to the federal entity ===
The current legal provision establishes that the last letter of the plate indicates the federal entity (estado) in which the vehicle was registered. It means that in the example plate AA000AB, the last letter "B" would identify the region. In previous resolutions, this was located in the first letter.

Code	State
A	Caracas/Capital District
B	Anzoátegui
C	Apure
D	Aragua
E	Barinas
F	Bolívar
G	Carabobo
H	Cojedes
I	Falcón
J	Guárico
K	Lara
L	Mérida
M	Miranda
N	Monagas
O	Nueva Esparta
P	Portuguesa
R	Sucre
S	Táchira
T	Trujillo
U	Yaracuy
V	Zulia
W	Vargas
X	Amazonas (Venezuela)
Y	Delta Amacuro

During the 1990s, the use of the letters W, X and Y began to designate the former federal territories that were elevated to the category of state: Delta Amacuro in 1991, Amazonas in 1992 and Vargas in 1998. For its part, the letter Z is used for signalization, but does not designate any entity in particular.

=== Depending on the type of vehicle ===
The license plates between ordinary (private) vehicles and special ones present differences in the ordering of their characters, as well as in their measurements, designs and security devices depending on the use or the organization to which they are assigned.

==== Ordinary ====
Guy	Format	Description	Photo
Private cars	xx123xA	For use by private vehicles. The (x) indicate the variable alphabetic characters. The A at the end designates the federal entity in which the owner of the vehicle is domiciled.	

==== Specials ====
Guy	Format	Description
Blood Traction	x1xx2A	The (x) indicate the variable alphabetic characters. The A at the end designates the federal entity. It is the only license plate that has only six characters.
Motorcycles	xx1x23A	The (x) indicate the variable alphabetic characters.
Cars, minibuses, passenger vans and mobile homes	xx123xA	Idem.
Freight vehicles	x12xx3A	Idem.
Cranes	x12x34A	Idem.
Vehicles for the disabled	(Symbol)x12x3A	Idem.
School transportation	x123x4A	Idem.
Private transportation	x1234xA	Idem.
Tourist transport	Rustic: x1xx23A; Minibuses: x12x3xx Buses: x1x2x3x	Idem.
Urban public transport	01xx2xA	Idem. The numbers at the beginning of the serials are fixed.
Suburban public transport	Cars: 12x3x4A; Minibuses: 21x34xA; Buses: 31xx24 A	Idem. The numbers at the beginning of the serials are fixed.
Intercity public transport	Cars: 412x3xA; Minibuses: 512xx3A; Buses: 6123x4 A	Idem. The numbers at the beginning of the serials are fixed.
Taxis	7x1x2xA	Idem. The numbers at the beginning of the serials are fixed.
Public transport in peripheral area	Rustic: 8x1x23A; Minibuses: 9x123xA	Idem. The numbers at the beginning of the serials are fixed.
Test vehicles, chassis and provisional	123456A	Idem. Below the serial must be the inscription Temporal. The plate shall have a lime yellow background and black characters.
Vehicles entered the country under the Special Free Port Regime	Motorcycles: xx1234O; Non-profit vehicles: xx12x3O; Cargo: x1x234O; Public transport: 1xx234O	Idem. The O at the end of the serial, symbolizing the state Nueva Esparta, is fixed. Below the serial must be the inscription Puerto Libre. The plate must have a faded gray state map in the background in the center. On the left side, a faded red vertical stripe, and on the right side a design of the national flag.

==== Officials ====
Guy	Format	Description	Photo
Executive Branch	President: 01; Vice President: 02; Ministers: 03; Attorney General: 04	Exclusive of the charges mentioned. The plaque bears a raised and colored design of the national coat of arms followed by the assigned numbers, on a gold background and with black alphanumeric characters. Below the serial, the position it represents.	
Legislative Power	President of the AN: PL-01; Vice presidents of the AN: PL-02 and PL-03	Ibid. Below the serial, the position it represents, printed or labeled in abbreviated form.	
Judiciary	President of the TSJ: PJ-01; Principal Magistrate: PJ-02	Ibid.	
Citizen Power	Comptroller General: PC-01; Ombudsman: PC-02; Attorney General: PC-03	Ibid.	
Electoral Power	President of the CNE: PE-01; Principal Rector of the CNE: PE-02	Ibid.	
Diplomatic Corps	(Serial assigned by the MPPRE)	The plates have a red background with white alphanumeric characters. Below the serial, the inscription Diplomatic Corps or Consular Corps stamped in relief.	
State Public Power	01-A	Exclusive to state governors. Design and background identical to the plates of the National Public Power. The letter at the end identifies the state of the regional president.	
Municipal Public Power	23-A	Exclusive to the mayors of municipalities. Identical design and background. The letter at the end identifies the state to which the mayor's municipality belongs.	
National Armed Force	Army: 0000001; Aviation: 0000002; Army: 0000003; National Guard: 0000004	Only assigned to vehicles for official use. The fixed numbers identify the component, while the rest of the correlative characters vary. Optionally, a printed shield can be used, at the discretion of each military component. The plates will have a blue background and the characters will be white. Below the serial, the word that identifies the component.	
Technical Corps of Surveillance of Traffic and Land Transportation	TT-12345	Variable numbers. Optionally, a shield or the logo of the MPPTOP may be incorporated. The plate will have an orange background and blue alphanumeric characters.	
Police, ambulances, fire departments and forensic medicine	1–01-A	The first number identifies the body, followed by assigned correlative numbers and a letter that identifies the federal entity. Plates with the words or shield of the component. Green background design and white alphanumeric characters.	

== Controversies ==
The new Venezuelan license plates in force since 2008 have been strongly criticized by citizens and by security forces because it is difficult to identify a vehicle at the time of any type of accident (theft, homicide, robbery, collision without responsibility, etc.) what makes the old system (1982 -1997) endearing, where the plates had three letters and three numbers, the type of use was identified with colors at the bottom of the plate and at the bottom of the letters, the special plates also they were visibly notable (schoolchildren, taxi, by post and public authorities). It has been determined worldwide that the more numbers and letters the license plate of a vehicle has, the more difficult and tedious the identification system is.
