= Antonio Díaz Municipality =

Antonio Díaz Municipality may refer to:

- Antonio Díaz Municipality, Delta Amacuro
- Antonio Díaz Municipality, Nueva Esparta
