= Fort San Francisco =

Fort San Francisco may refer to:

- Fort San Francisco, Guadalajara (Spain);
- Fort San Francisco, Santiago de Cuba (Cuba);
- Fort San Francisco del Risco, en Las Palmas de Gran Canaria (Spain);
- Fort San Francisco de Asís, en Delta Amacuro (Venezuela).
