= Astrothelium norisianum =

Scientific classification
- Kingdom: Fungi
- Division: Ascomycota
- Class: Dothideomycetes
- Order: Trypetheliales
- Family: Trypetheliaceae
- Genus: Astrothelium
- Species: A. norisianum

Binomial name
- Astrothelium norisianum Lücking, M.P.Nelsen & Aptroot (2016)
- Type locality: Altos de Campana National Park, Panama

Species of lichen-forming fungus

Astrothelium norisianum is a species of crustose lichen-forming fungus in the family Trypetheliaceae. The lichen forms a pale olive-yellow crusty patch on tree bark with a coarsely bumpy, gall-like surface. Its reproductive structures are grouped together in irregular to elongated clusters that are typically covered by a whitish surface layer and fluoresce yellow under ultraviolet light. The species occurs in humid forests from Mexico through Central America to the Amazon basin and Peru.

== Taxonomy ==
Astrothelium norisianum was described as a new species by Robert Lücking, Matthew Nelsen, and André Aptroot. The type was collected in Panama (Panamá Province) in Altos de Campana National Park west of Panama City, where it was found on tree bark in submontane rainforest at about 500–600 m (1,600–2,000 ft) elevation.

The species was named in honor of professor Noris Salazar-Allen, a Panamanian botanist recognized for her contributions to the study of Panamanian cryptogams. It is separated from the similar A. sepultum by developing distinct, well-delimited pseudostromata (aggregated fruiting body structures) containing aggregated perithecia; in A. sepultum the perithecia are not arranged in such clearly defined structures. Astrothelium norisianum also differs in having an inspersed ostiolar region, while A. sepultum is described as lacking this feature and has consistently two-spored asci.

== Description ==
The thallus is crustose and grows on bark, forming a continuous patch up to about 15 cm (6 in) across. It is very pale olive-yellow and uneven to coarsely bumpy, with gall-forming bumps about 1–5 mm (3/64–13/64 in) in diameter. In cross section, the thallus has a thick, cartilage-like cortex, while the photobiont layer and thick medulla are immersed in the modified outer bark.

The perithecia are aggregated, with about five to ten fruiting bodies completely immersed in irregular to linear pseudostromata. These pseudostromata are typically about 2–5 mm (5/64–13/64 in) long and 1–3 mm (3/64–1/8 in) wide, often uneven and frequently merging with one another. They are usually covered by a whitish surface layer and may develop on the thallus galls. The ostioles are lateral and fused, with one to several shared openings that are papillate, brownish, and about 0.05–0.10 mm wide. Individual perithecia are pear-shaped and arranged laterally, with ostiolar channels that are irregularly oriented and fused; they are about 0.3–0.5 mm wide and up to 1 mm long. The excipulum is dark brown to weakly carbonized and about 20–30 μm thick, and the space between perithecia is filled with amorphous orange-brown tissue. The hamathecium consists of densely interwoven, net-like paraphyses in a clear gelatinous matrix (IKI−); the upper hamathecium and the ostiolar channel are strongly inspersed.

The ascospores are hyaline and occur one or two per ascus. They are oblong-ellipsoid, densely muriform, and have a distinct median constriction and a thick outer wall, measuring about 150–200 × 50–60 µm (IKI−). The thallus and pseudostromata contain lichexanthone and fluoresce yellow under ultraviolet light (UV+ yellow).

== Habitat and distribution ==
The species is known from humid forests in the Neotropics. The type locality is in submontane (lower mountain) rainforest in Altos de Campana National Park, Panama, where it was collected on the bark of trees in the shady understory along a gravel road.

Additional specimens have been reported from the same area in Panama, as well as from the Amazon region of Venezuela (Amazonas State, Atabapo area) in Amazon forest interrupted by small savannas, and from southeastern Peru (Madre de Dios) in tropical lowland rainforest. Based on the original collections, A. norisianum was known from Panama, Venezuela, and Peru. It has since been recorded in Mexico and Costa Rica.
