= Apostolic Vicariate of Caroní =

Latin Catholic ecclesiastical jurisdiction in Venezuela

Apostolic Vicariate of Caroní Apostolicus Vicariatus Caronensis
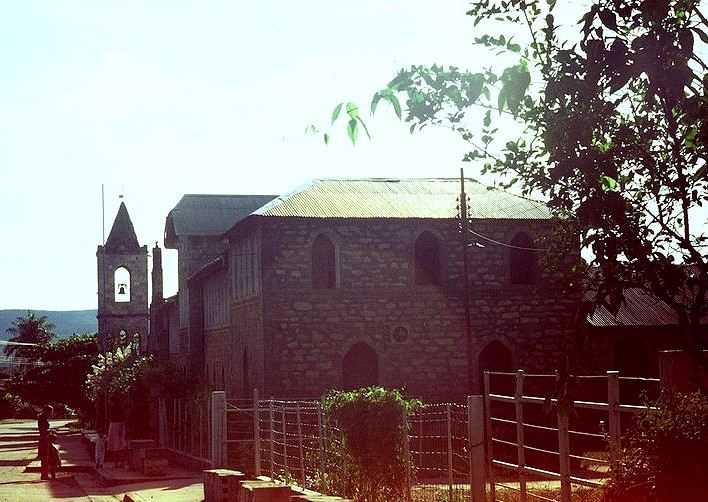
- Cathedral of St. Helen

Location
- Country: Venezuela
- Ecclesiastical province: Immediately exempt to the Holy See

Statistics
- Area: 80,309 km^{2} (31,007 sq mi)
- Population: Total; Catholics: (as of 2010); 56,000; 41,550 (74.2%)
- Parishes: 5

Information
- Denomination: Catholic Church
- Sui iuris church: Latin Church
- Rite: Roman Rite
- Established: 4 March 1922 (103 years ago)
- Cathedral: Catedral de Santa Elena

Current leadership
- Pope: Leo XIV
- Apostolic Vicar: Gonzalo Alfredo Ontiveros Vivas
- Bishops emeritus: Felipe González González

The Apostolic Vicariate (or Vicariate Apostolic) of Caroní (Latin: Apostolicus Vicariatus Caronensis) is a Latin Church missionary jurisdiction or apostolic vicariate of the Catholic Church in Venezuela.

It is immediately exempt to the Holy See and not part of any ecclesiastical province. Its cathedral, Catedral de Santa Elena, is located in the episcopal see of Santa Elena de Uairén in Venezuela's landlocked Bolívar state.

== History ==
On 4 March 1922 Pope Pius XI established the Apostolic Vicariate of Caroní.

It lost territory in 1954 when the Apostolic Vicariate of Tucupita was established.

== Incumbent Ordinaries ==
So far, all apostolic vicars were Capuchins

- Benvenuto Diego Alonso y Nistal, OFMCap † (23 Dec. 1923 – 24 March 1938)
- Constantino Gómez Villa, OFMCap † (14 July 1938 – 11 Oct. 1967)
- Mariano Gutiérrez Salazar, OFMCap † (11 March 1968 – 23 Oct. 1995)
- Santiago Pérez Sánchez, OFMCap † (28 May 1993 – 2 July 1994)
- Jesús Alfonso Guerrero Contreras, OFMCap (6 Dec. 1995 – 9 April 2011: Appointed Bishop of Machiques)
- Felipe González González, OFMCap (26 May 2014 – 27 April 2021)
- Gonzalo Alfredo Ontiveros Vivas (27 April 2021 – present)

== See also ==
- Roman Catholicism in Venezuela
- List of Catholic dioceses (structured view)
