= Sierra Imataca, Delta Amacuro =

- Coordinates: 8°27′N 62°26′W

Sierra Imataca is the municipal seat of the Casacoima Municipality, in the Delta Amacuro State, Venezuela. It comprises two communities: Mantecales and Cuya.

The town is called after the Imataka Mountains that run to the South in the Bolívar State.

The place is 39 km from the Castillos de Guayana, the ruins of some of the first castles built by the Spaniards in South America.
