= Apostolic Vicariate of Tucupita =

Catholic missionary jurisdiction in Venezuela

Apostolic Vicariate of Tucupita Apostolicus Vicariatus Tucupitensis

Location
- Country: Venezuela

Statistics
- Area: 40,200 km^{2} (15,500 sq mi)
- Population: Total; Catholics: (as of 2010); 136,000; 104,000 (76.5%)
- Parishes: 4

Information
- Denomination: Catholic Church
- Rite: Roman Rite
- Established: 30 July 1954 (70 years ago)
- Cathedral: Catedral de la Divina Pastora

Current leadership
- Pope: Francis
- Apostolic Vicar: Ernesto José Romero Rivas

The Apostolic Vicariate (or Vicariate Apostolic) of Tucupita (Latin: Apostolicus Vicariatus Tucupitensis) is a missionary circonscription of the Roman Catholic Church in Venezuela.

It is exempt, i.e. directly dependent on the Holy See, not part of any ecclesiastical province. Its cathedral see is located in Tucupita, the city capital of Venezuela's Atlantic-coastal Delta Amacuro state.

== History ==
On 30 July 1954, Pope Pius XII established the Apostolic Vicariate of Tucupita from territory taken from the Apostolic Vicariate of Caroní.

== Incumbent Ordinaries ==
Note: so far, all its Apostolic Vicars were Capuchins and titular bishops

- Argimiro Alvaro García Rodríguez, OFMCap † (19 Dec. 1955 – 25 Nov. 1985)
- Felipe González González, OFMCap (25 Nov. 1985 – 26 May 2014)
- Ernesto José Romero Rivas, OFMCap (7 April 2015 – present)

== See also ==
- Roman Catholicism in Venezuela
