= Federal Territories of Venezuela =

Former type of political division in Venezuela

The Federal Territories (Spanish: Territorios Federales) is a special political division in the territory of Venezuela. Their existence is provided for in Article 16 of the National Constitution of 1999, with the national government in charge of administration according to law. Currently, there are no Federal Territories in the country because they were elevated to the category of State within the Venezuelan Federation.

== Creation ==
The federal territories would be regulated by the organic law that is able to decree its creation in certain areas of the states, whose validity would be subject to completion of a referendum approving the respective and special law federal entity that may be given to a Federal Territory State category, assigning all or part of the land area.

== History ==
Since 1864, under the government of General Antonio Guzmán Blanco and by Special Act of Congress, the Amazonas and Delta Amacuro Federal Territories were created as territorial political division Federal, until they gained the status of Federal States, via the corresponding Special Act in the year of 1992. On July 4, 1895, President Joaquín Crespo organized the Venezuelan islands in the Caribbean as part of the "Colón Federal Territory," then these territories were divided between the State of Nueva Esparta and the Federal Dependencies.

In 1998, Vargas, during the government of Rafael Caldera, was elevated to the category of "Federal Territory" for a short period of time when Municipality Vargas's position, pertaining to the Federal District, was finally elevated to the rank of State in the 1999.

In 2011, the government of the "Francisco de Miranda Insular Territory" was established, comprising the Las Aves Archipelago, Los Roques Archipelago and La Orchila Island, north of Venezuela. The capital is the Los Roques Archipelago.

== List ==
| Name | Year start | Year end | Map |
|---|---|---|---|
| Amazonas Federal Territory | 1864 | 1992 | |
| Alto Orinoco Federal Territory | 1881 | 1893 | |
| Armisticio Federal Territory | 1883 | 1890 | |
| Caura Federal Territory | 1882 | 1891 | |
| Colón Federal Territory | 1871 | 1909 | |
| Cristóbal Colón Federal Territory | 1904 | 1909 | |
| Delta Amacuro Federal Territory | 1884 | 1991 | |
| Guajira Federal Territory | 1864 | 1893 | |
| Maracay Federal Territory | 1879 | 1880 | |
| Margarita Federal Territory | 1900 | 1901 | |
| Mariño Federal Territory | 1872 | 1875 | |
| Tucacas Federal Territory | 1879 | 1880 | |
| Yuruari Federal Territory | 1881 | 1891 | |

== See also ==
- Administrative divisions of Venezuela
