= Curiapo =

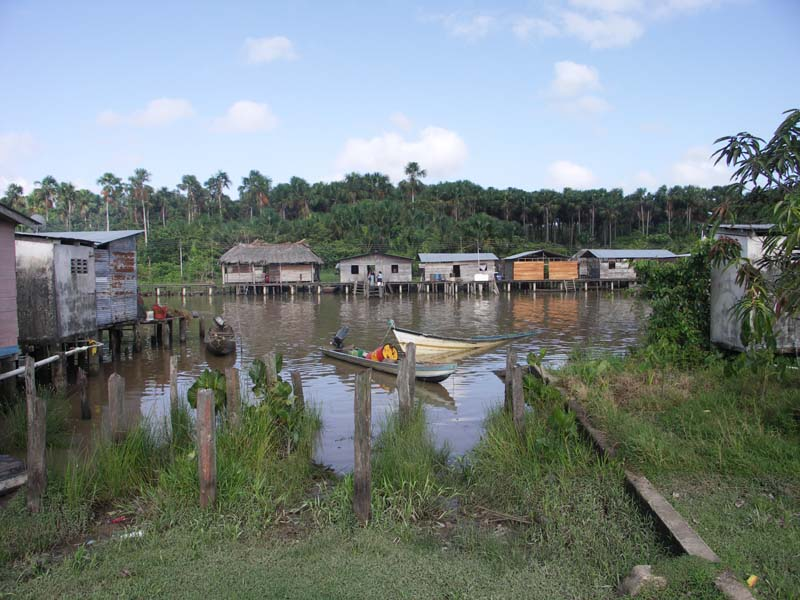
- View of Curiapo

- Location within Venezuela
- Coordinates: 8°34′48″N 60°59′51″W
- Country: Venezuela
- State: Delta Amacuro
- Municipality: Antonio Díaz Municipality
- Time zone: VST
- Climate: Af

Curiapo is a village in the Delta Amacuro, capital of the Antonio Díaz Municipality in Venezuela.

== Population ==
In 2001 there were some 2880 Warao Indians registered in the parish.

== Education ==
There are a couple of basic schools in town. Escuela Pedernales is the biggest one.

== See also ==
- List of cities and towns in Venezuela
