= Pedernales Municipality =

Pedernales Municipality Municipio Pedernales
- Municipality
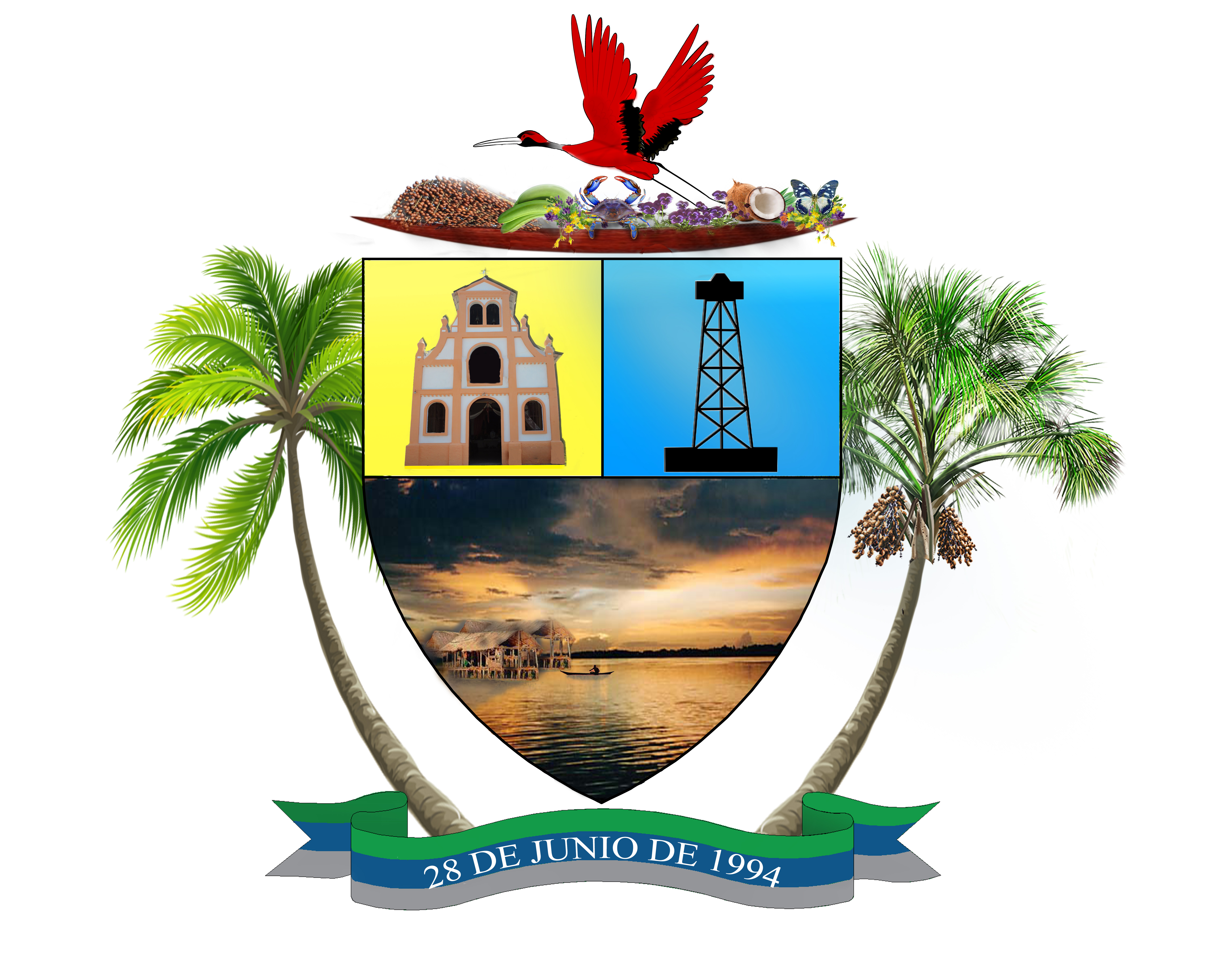
- Flag Coat of arms

- Location in Delta Amacuro

- Location in Venezuela
- Coordinates: 9°43′09″N 62°07′33″W
- Country: Venezuela
- State: Delta Amacuro
- Municipal seat: Pedernales

Government
  - Mayor: Anderson Osuna Salazar (PSUV)

Area
  - Total: 3,442.6 km^{2} (1,329.2 sq mi)

Population (2007)
  - Total: 6,535
  - Density: 1.898/km^{2} (4.917/sq mi)
- Time zone: UTC−4 (VET)
- Area code(s): 0287

The Pedernales Municipality is one of the four municipalities (municipios) that makes up the eastern Venezuelan state of Delta Amacuro and, according to a 2007 population estimate by the National Institute of Statistics of Venezuela, the municipality has a population of 6,535. The town of Pedernales is the municipal seat of the Pedernales Municipality.

== History ==
The Pedernales District became the Pedernales Municipality in 1994.

== Demographics ==
The Pedernales Municipality, according to a 2007 population estimate by the National Institute of Statistics of Venezuela, has a population of 6,535 (up from 5,181 in 2000). This amounts to 4.2% of the state's population. The municipality's population density is 1.85 inhabitants per square kilometre (4.8/sq mi).

== Government ==
The mayor of the Pedernales Municipality is Selgio Buanerges Ramírez, elected on October 31, 2004, with 40% of the vote. He replaced Cristobal Jimenez shortly after the elections. The municipality is divided into two parishes; Pedernales and Luis Beltrán Prieto Figueroa (previous to February 25, 1995, the Pedernales Municipality contained only a single parish).
