= Casacoima Municipality =

Casacoima Municipality Municipio Casacoima
- Municipality
- Flag

- Location in Delta Amacuro

- Location in Venezuela
- Coordinates: 8°30′36″N 62°02′56″W
- Country: Venezuela
- State: Delta Amacuro
- Municipal seat: Sierra Imataca

Government
  - Mayor: Héctor Sosa Bolívar (PSUV)

Area
  - Total: 2,701.7 km^{2} (1,043.1 sq mi)

Population (2011)
  - Total: 37,106
  - Density: 13.734/km^{2} (35.572/sq mi)
- Time zone: UTC−4 (VET)
- Area code(s): 0286
- Website: Official website

The Casacoima Municipality is one of the four municipalities (municipios) that makes up the eastern Venezuelan state of Delta Amacuro. according to the 2011 census by the National Institute of Statistics of Venezuela, the municipality has a population of 31,706. The town of Sierra Imataca is the shire town of the Casacoima Municipality.

== Demographics ==
The Casacoima Municipality, according to a 2007 population estimate by the National Institute of Statistics of Venezuela, has a population of 27,792 (up from 21,217 in 2000). This amounts to 17.9% of the state's population. The municipality's population density is 9.52 inhabitants per square kilometre (24.7/sq mi).

== Government ==
The mayor of the Casacoima Municipality is Pedro Santaella, elected on October 31, 2004, with 22% of the vote. He replaced Jose Flores shortly after the elections. The municipality is divided into five parishes; Imataca, Cinco de Julio, Juan Bautista Arismendi, Manuel Piar, and Rómulo Gallegos (previous to February 25, 1995, the Casacoima Municipality contained only a single parish).
