= Administrative divisions of Venezuela =

Venezuela is divided into 23 states (estados), 1 Capital District (Distrito Capital) and the Federal Dependencies (Dependencias Federales de Ultramar) that consist of numerous Venezuelan islands. These administrative divisions are grouped into regions.

== Historical subdivisions ==
Prior to the Federal War (1859–1863), Venezuela was divided into provinces rather than states. The victorious forces were supposed to grant more autonomy to the individual states, but this was not implemented.

Between 1863 and the early 1900s, there were numerous territorial changes, including the merger and splitting of states. Thereafter, until the late 1990s, the states were left unchanged. Recent years have seen the creation of three new states: Delta Amacuro, Amazonas, and Vargas (in that order).

== Municipal organization ==
Venezuela Municipalities

Venezuelan states are subdivided into "municipalities" (Spanish municipios), which may correspond to either or both of county and city in English-speaking countries. Municipios are the fundamental unit of local government in Venezuela.

== See also ==
- Federal Territories of Venezuela
