= Tucupita =

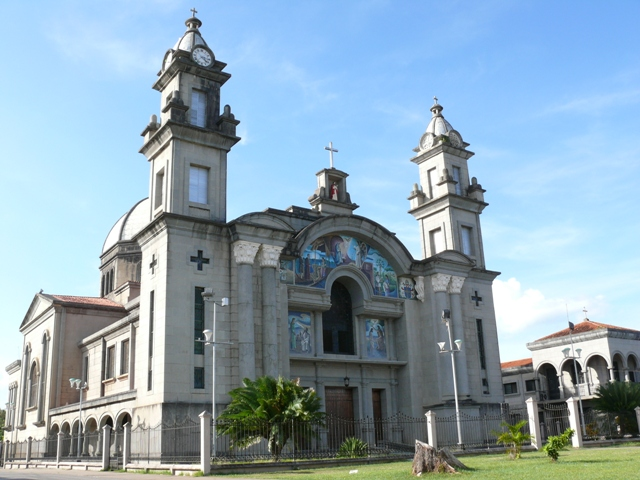
- Divina Pastora Cathedral.

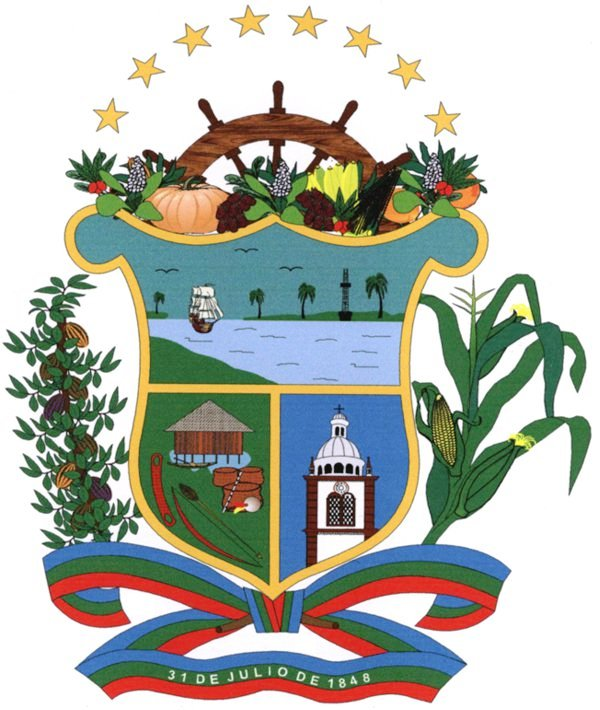
- Flag Coat of arms

- Location within Venezuela
- Coordinates: 09°03′33″N 62°04′05″W
- Country: Venezuela
- State: Delta Amacuro
- Municipality: Tucupita
- Founded: 1848

Government
  - Mayor: Loa Tamaronis
- Elevation: 5 m (16 ft)

Population (2011)
  - Total: 86,487
  - Density: 6.6/km^{2} (17/sq mi)
  - Demonym: Tucupiteño(a)
- Time zone: UTC−4 (VET)
- Postal code: 6401
- Area code: 0287
- Climate: Am
- Website: Alcaldía de Tucupita (in Spanish)

Tucupita (Spanish pronunciation: [tukuˈpita]) is the capital city of the Venezuelan state of Delta Amacuro.

== Geography ==
Delta Amacuro consists almost entirely of the swampy Orinoco River delta. Tucupita is hot and humid, and lies well into the delta on the Caño Manamo river (one of the two major branches of the Orinoco river delta). It is approached by a road which runs along the top of a barrier constructed in the 1960s to create dry land. The project is considered by many to be a failure since little dry land was created and massive ecological disruption was caused by salt water penetration of the delta.

The delta is covered mostly by mangrove swamp but there is a huge range of other flora and fauna, making it one of the world's more ecologically diverse places. Significant amounts of oil have been discovered in the western parts of the delta and there is apprehension that exploitation of this oil will cause substantial ecological damage.

=== Climate ===
Tucupita has a tropical monsoon climate (Köppen Am), bordering on a tropical savanna climate, with a short dry season from January to March.

Climate data for Tucupita
Month	Jan	Feb	Mar	Apr	May	Jun	Jul	Aug	Sep	Oct	Nov	Dec	Year
Record high °C (°F)	35.5 (95.9)	35.5 (95.9)	35.0 (95.0)	35.5 (95.9)	36.0 (96.8)	36.5 (97.7)	36.0 (96.8)	37.0 (98.6)	36.5 (97.7)	36.0 (96.8)	35.5 (95.9)	35.0 (95.0)	35.0 (95.0)
Mean daily maximum °C (°F)	31.5 (88.7)	31.9 (89.4)	32.3 (90.1)	33.8 (92.8)	32.6 (90.7)	31.7 (89.1)	32.0 (89.6)	31.4 (88.5)	31.9 (89.4)	32.2 (90.0)	32.4 (90.3)	31.8 (89.2)	30.9 (87.6)
Mean daily minimum °C (°F)	22.2 (72.0)	22.7 (72.9)	24.4 (75.9)	24.9 (76.8)	25.2 (77.4)	24.5 (76.1)	24.1 (75.4)	23.6 (74.5)	23.9 (75.0)	23.3 (73.9)	22.8 (73.0)	23.6 (74.5)	22.1 (71.8)
Record low °C (°F)	17.0 (62.6)	17.5 (63.5)	17.0 (62.6)	18.0 (64.4)	18.5 (65.3)	18.0 (64.4)	16.0 (60.8)	17.0 (62.6)	16.5 (61.7)	17.5 (63.5)	16.0 (60.8)	16.5 (61.7)	16.0 (60.8)
Average rainfall mm (inches)	58.4 (2.30)	45.7 (1.80)	22.8 (0.90)	71.1 (2.80)	190.5 (7.50)	473.4 (18.64)	425.2 (16.74)	294.9 (11.61)	218.3 (8.59)	104.9 (4.13)	142.4 (5.61)	71.2 (2.80)	2,118.8 (83.42)
Average relative humidity (%)	73.4	71.6	70.8	72.5	76.8	79.2	79.4	78.1	76.0	73.9	74.6	73.7	75.0
Source: Instituto Nacional de Meteorología e Hidrología (INAMEH)

== Religion ==
Tucupita is the cathedral see of the Roman Catholic Apostolic Vicariate of Tucupita, with the Cathedral of the Divine Shepherdess.

== Tourism ==
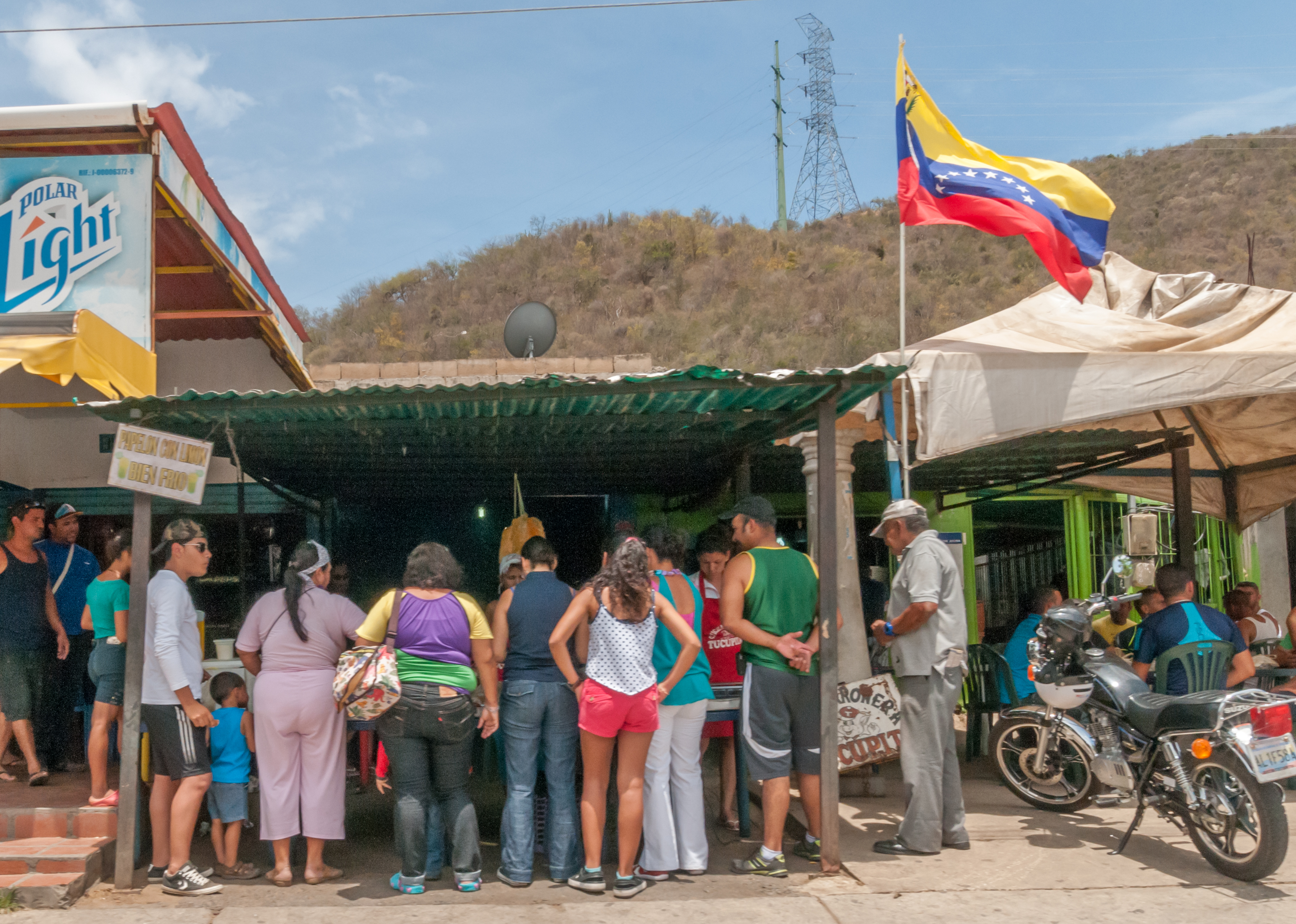
Chicharronera in Tucupita.

The main income of Tucupita comes from eco-tourism. The attractions are the birds, mammals and reptiles of the delta, and the villages of the local Indians, the Warao. Tourists can visit the remote parts of the delta and stay in the stilted houses of the Warao in the delta itself.

There are bus connections to Bolivar City and other towns in the north of Venezuela, but in the delta itself only travel by boat is possible.

== See also ==
- List of cities and towns in Venezuela
