= Tucupita Municipality =

Tucupita Municipality Municipio Tucupita
- Municipality
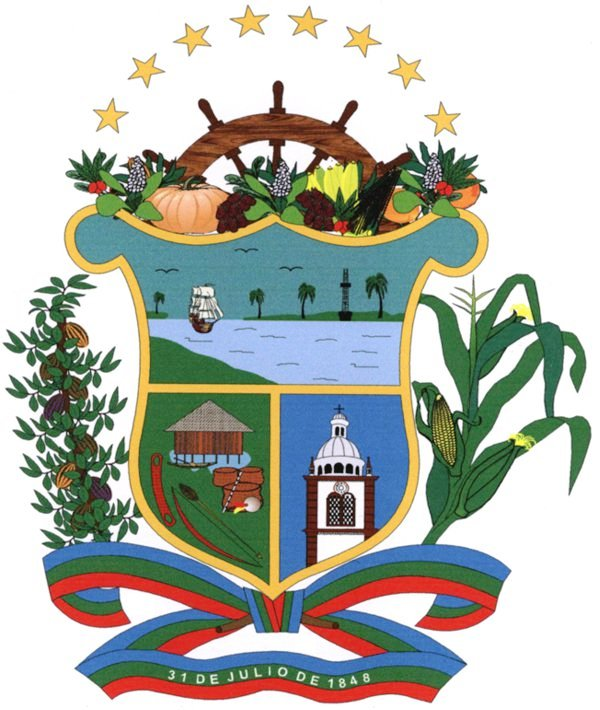
- Flag Coat of arms

- Location in Delta Amacuro

- Location in Venezuela
- Coordinates: 9°15′39″N 61°40′57″W
- Country: Venezuela
- State: Delta Amacuro
- Municipal seat: Tucupita

Government
  - Mayor: Asnardo Rodríguez Santaella (PSUV)

Area
  - Total: 11,323.1 km^{2} (4,371.9 sq mi)

Population (2007)
  - Total: 93,368
  - Density: 8.2458/km^{2} (21.357/sq mi)
- Time zone: UTC−4 (VET)
- Area code(s): 0287

The Tucupita Municipality is one of the four municipalities (municipios) that makes up the eastern Venezuelan state of Delta Amacuro and, according to a 2007 population estimate by the National Institute of Statistics of Venezuela, the municipality has a population of 93,368. The town of Tucupita is the municipal of the Tucupita Municipality.

== History ==
The city of Tucupita was founded in 1848. The city's population began making significant growth in 1933 thanks to the petroleum exploration in the region that lasted until the early 1960s.

== Geography ==
Delta Amacuro consists almost entirely of the swampy Orinoco River Delta. The hot and humid Tucupita lies well into the delta on the Caño Manamo river (one of the two major branches of the Orinoco river delta). It is approached by a road which runs along the top of a gigantic barrier constructed in the 1960s to create dry land. The project is considered by many to be a failure since little dry land was created and massive ecological disruption was caused by salt water penetration of the delta.

The delta is covered mostly by mangrove swamp but there is a huge range of other flora and fauna making it one of the world's more ecologically diverse places. Significant amounts of oil have been discovered in the western parts of the delta and there is apprehension that exploitation of this oil will cause substantial ecological damage.

== Demographics ==
The Tucupita Municipality, according to a 2007 population estimate by the National Institute of Statistics of Venezuela, has a population of 93,368 (up from 79,977 in 2000). This amounts to 72.9% of the state's population. The municipality's population density is 8.49 inhabitants per square kilometre (22.0/sq mi).

== Government ==
The mayor of the Tucupita Municipality is Edgar Genaro Dominguez Gerrero, elected on October 31, 2004 with 40% of the vote. He replaced Juan Gonzalez shortly after the elections. The municipality is divided into eight parishes; San José, José Vidal Marcano, Juan Millán, Leonardo Ruíz Pineda, Mariscal Antonio José de Sucre, Monseñor Argimiro García, San Rafael, and Virgen del Valle (previous to February 25, 1995, the Tucupita Municipality contained only a single parish).

== See also ==
- Tucupita
- Delta Amacuro
- Municipalities of Venezuela
