= Pedernales, Delta Amacuro =

Pedernales
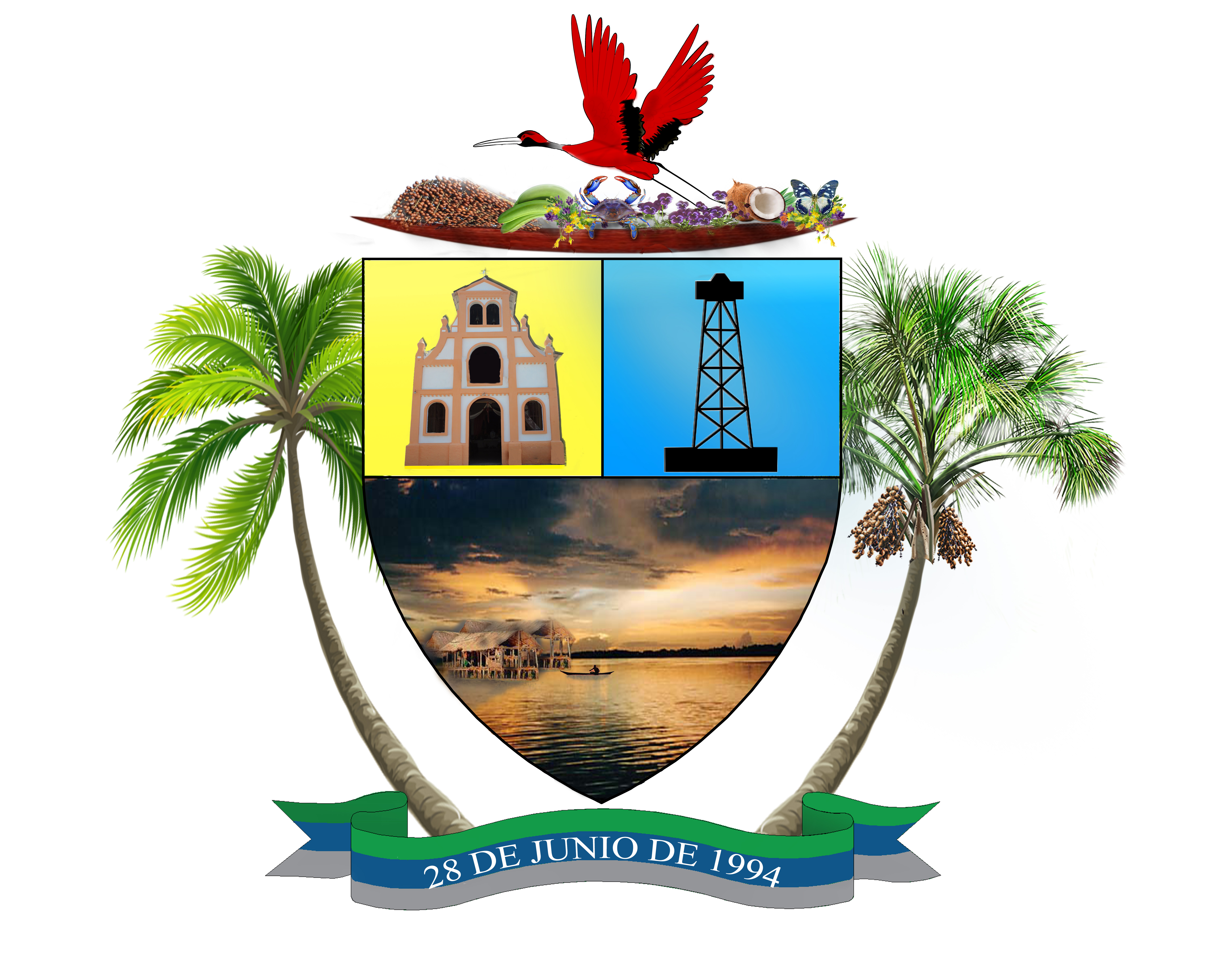
- Coat of arms

- Location within Venezuela
- Coordinates: 9°57′59″N 62°15′09″W
- Country: Venezuela
- State: Delta Amacuro
- Municipality: Pedernales Municipality
- Elevation: 15 m (49 ft)
- Time zone: VST
- Climate: Am

Pedernales (Spanish pronunciation: [peðeɾˈnales]) is a village in the Venezuelan state of Delta Amacuro on the Gulf of Paria.
