= Maroa, Amazonas =

Town in Amazonas, Venezuela

Coordinates: 2°44′N 67°34′W

Maroa
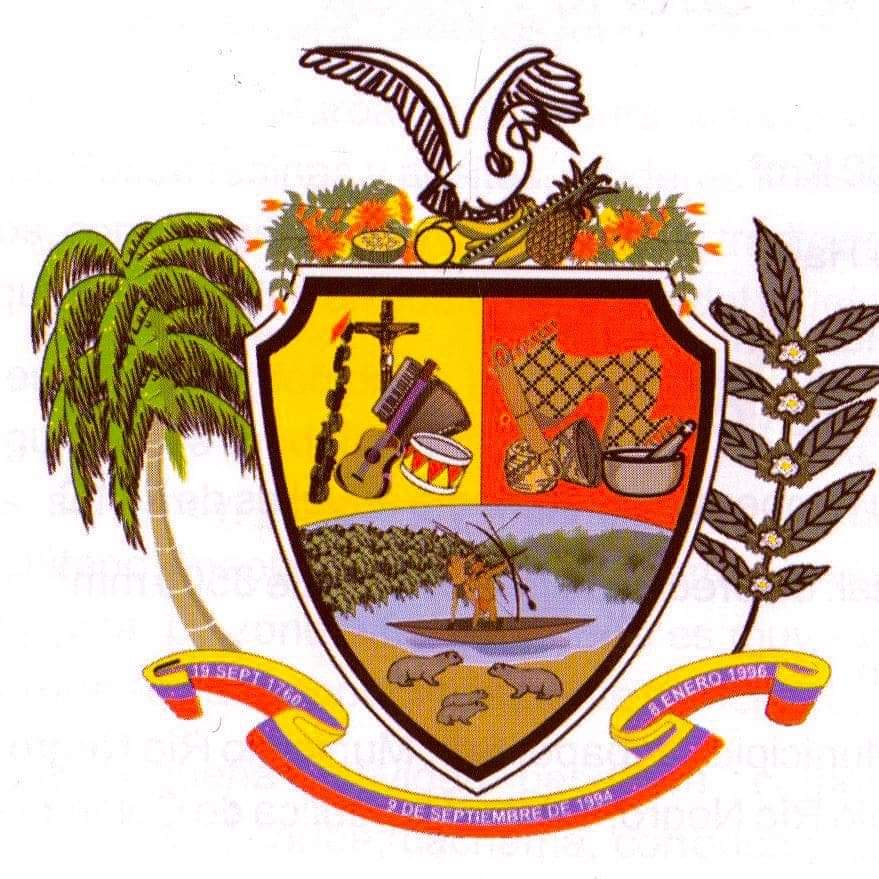
- Coat of arms
- Interactive map of Maroa
- Country: Venezuela
- State: Amazonas
- Municipality: Maroa
- Founded: 1760

Government
  - Mayor: Thaimir Briceño Angulo (PSUV)

Area
  - Total: 14,250 km^{2} (5,500 sq mi)

Population (2001)
  - Total: 890
  - Density: 0.0625/km^{2} (0.162/sq mi)
- Time zone: UTC−4 (VET)
- Area code: 0248
- Climate: Af
- Website: maroa-amazonas.gov.ve
- The area and population figures are for the municipality

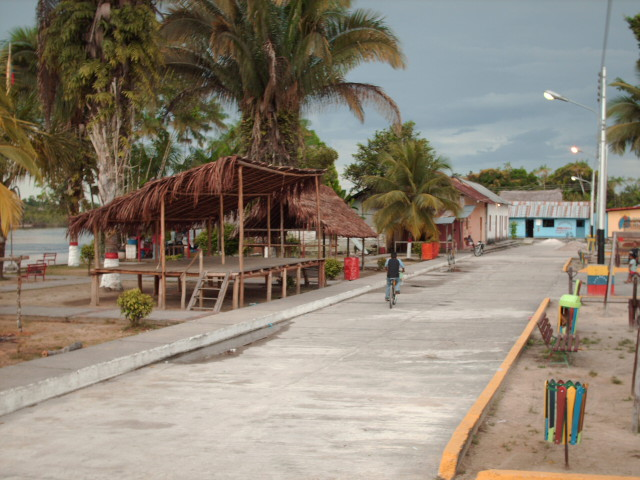
A view of the Maroa Town

Maroa is a town in the southern Venezuelan state of Amazonas. This town is the shire town of the Maroa Municipality (or Guainía Municipality) and, according to the 2001 Venezuelan census, the municipality has a population of 890.

== History ==
Maroa was founded by the brave Cacique Maruwa in the year 1760.

== Demographics ==
The Maroa Municipality, according to the 2001 Venezuelan census, has a population of 890 (down from 1,140 in 1990). This amounts to 2% of Amazonas's population. The municipality's population density is 0.2 people per square mile (0.0625/km^{2}).

== Government ==
Maroa is the shire town of the Maroa Municipality (or Guainía Municipality) in Amazonas. The mayor of the Maroa Municipality (or Guainía Municipality) is Thaimir Briceño Angulo, elected in 2004 with 61% of the vote. She replaced Antonio Briceño shortly after the last municipal elections in October 2004.

== See also ==
- List of cities and towns in Venezuela
