= San Fernando de Atabapo =

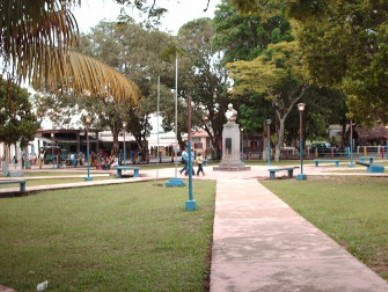
- Plaza Bolívar in San Fernando de Atabapo

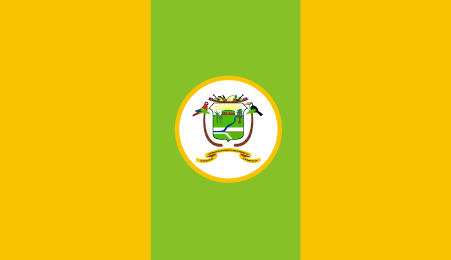
- Flag

- Location in Venezuela
- Coordinates: 4°03′N 67°40′W
- Country: Venezuela
- State: Amazonas
- Municipality: Atabapo Municipality
- Founded: 1758

Population (2024)
  - Total: 9,404
- Time zone: UTC−4 (VET)
- Area code: 0248
- Climate: Af

San Fernando de Atabapo is a town in southern Venezuela on the border with Colombia. It was the capital city of the Amazonas state until the early 1900s. The population in 1997 was approximately 5,000.

In the early twentieth century it was ruled for a long time by Tomás Funes, a powerful caudillo who controlled the local rubber industry (derived from indigenous rubber plants) by enslaving the local native populations. His power eventually became great enough to threaten the Venezuelan authorities and he was ultimately executed in the town square in the early 1930s. The town displays a photograph of a United States military aircraft that was shot down and crashed into the Orinoco River around this time. A Venezuelan National Guard unit is stationed here.
