= Maroa Municipality =

Autónomo Maroa Municipality Municipio Autónomo Maroa
- Municipality
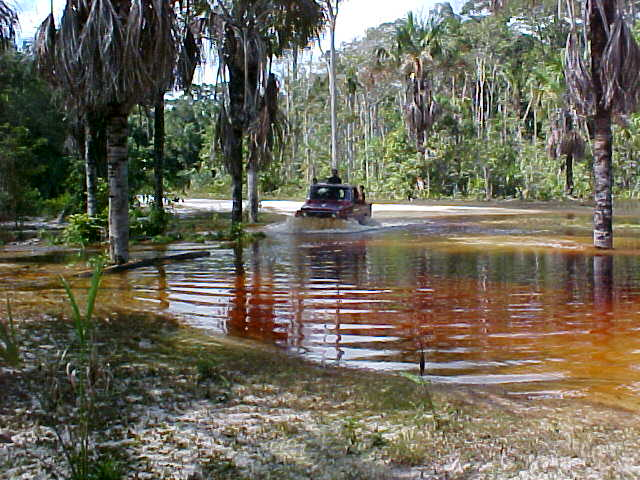
- Tiriquin River

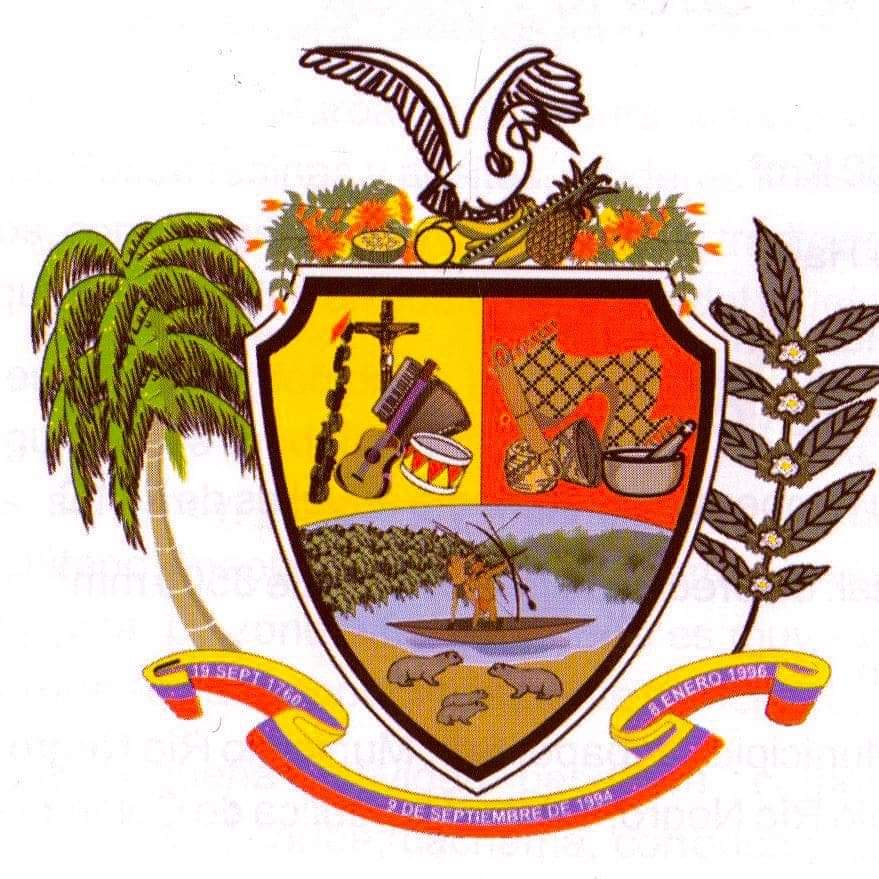
- Flag Coat of arms

- Location in Amazonas

- Location in Venezuela
- Coordinates: 2°34′52″N 67°03′50″W
- Country: Venezuela
- State: Amazonas
- Municipal seat: Maroa

Government
  - Mayor: Thaimir Briceño Angulo (MVR)

Area
  - Total: 13,629.7 km^{2} (5,262.5 sq mi)

Population (2011)
  - Total: 2,029
  - Density: 0.1489/km^{2} (0.3856/sq mi)
- Time zone: UTC−4 (VET)
- Area code(s): 0248
- Website: Official website

The Maroa Municipality (Spanish: Municipio Maroa) is one of the seven municipalities (municipios) that makes up the southern Venezuelan state of Amazonas and, according to the 2011 census by the National Institute of Statistics of Venezuela, the municipality had a population of 2,029. The town of Maroa is the shire town of the Maroa Municipality.

== History ==
Maroa was founded by the Cacique Maruwa in 1760.

== Demographics ==
The Maroa Municipality, according to a 2007 population estimate by the National Institute of Statistics of Venezuela, had a population of 1,900 (up from 1,706 in 2000). This amounted to 1.3% of the state's population. The municipality's population density is 0.1 inhabitants per square kilometre (0.26/sq mi).

== Government ==
The mayor of the Maroa Municipality is Thaimir Briceño Angulo, elected on October 31, 2004, with 61% of the vote. She replaced Antonio Briceño shortly after the elections. The municipality is divided into two parishes; Victorino and Comunidad (previous to December 18, 1997, the Maroa Municipality contained only a single parish).

== See also ==
- Maroa, Amazonas
- Amazonas
- Municipalities of Venezuela
