= Antonio Díaz Municipality, Delta Amacuro =

Antonio Díaz Municipality Municipio Antonio Díaz
- Municipality
- Flag

- Location in Delta Amacuro

- Location in Venezuela
- Coordinates: 8°38′33″N 60°47′15″W
- Country: Venezuela
- State: Delta Amacuro
- Municipal seat: Curiapo

Government
  - Mayor: Amado Antonio Heredia Bolaño (Migente)

Area
  - Total: 21,345.3 km^{2} (8,241.5 sq mi)

Population (2011)
  - Total: 26,655
  - Density: 1.2488/km^{2} (3.2343/sq mi)
- Time zone: UTC−4 (VET)
- Area code(s): 0287

The Antonio Díaz Municipality is one of the four municipalities (municipios) that makes up the eastern Venezuelan state of Delta Amacuro and, according to the 2011 census by the National Institute of Statistics of Venezuela, the municipality has a population of 26,655. The town of Curiapo is the municipal seat of the Antonio Díaz Municipality.

== Demographics ==
The Antonio Díaz Municipality, according to a 2007 population estimate by the National Institute of Statistics of Venezuela, has a population of 27,693 (up from 21,664 in 2000). This amounts to 17.8% of the state's population. The municipality's population density is 1.22 inhabitants per square kilometre (3.2/sq mi).

== Government ==
The mayor of the Antonio Díaz Municipality is Amado Antonio Heredia Bolaño, re-elected on October 31, 2004, with 71% of the vote. The municipality is divided into six parishes; Curiapo, Almirante Luis Brión, Francisco Aniceto Lugo, Manuel Renaud, Padre Barral, and Santos de Abelgas (previous to February 25, 1995, the Antonio Díaz Municipality contained only a single parish).
