= Atabapo Municipality =

Atabapo Municipality Municipio Atabapo
- Municipality
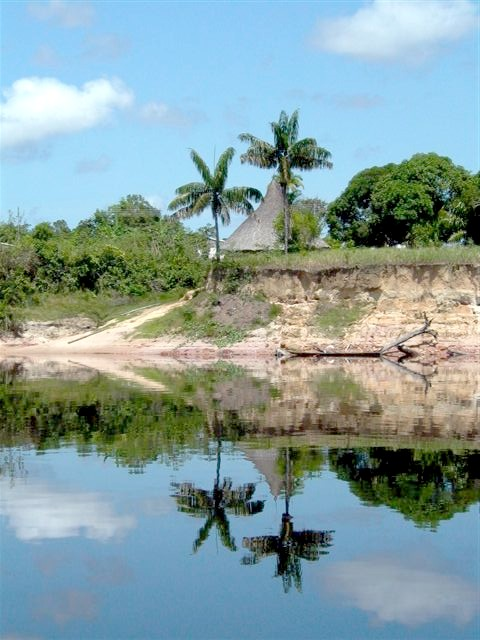
- San Fernando de Atabapo

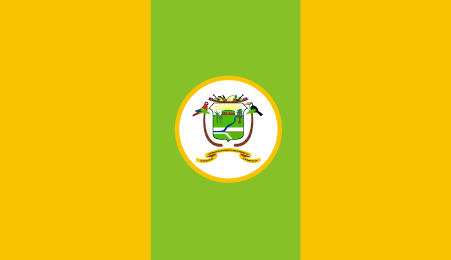
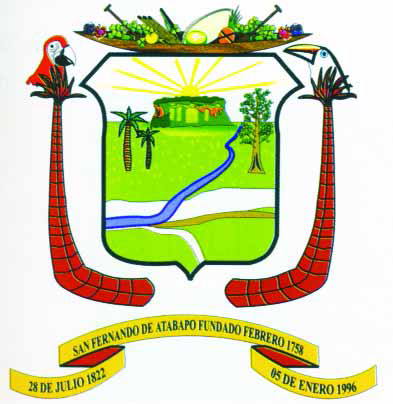
- Flag Coat of arms

- Location in Amazonas

- Location in Venezuela
- Coordinates: 3°43′33″N 66°49′58″W
- Country: Venezuela
- State: Amazonas

Government
  - Mayor: Nelsón Cayupare (PPT)

Area
  - Total: 25,142.5 km^{2} (9,707.6 sq mi)

Population (2011)
  - Total: 9,169
  - Density: 0.3647/km^{2} (0.9445/sq mi)
- Time zone: UTC−4 (VET)
- Area code(s): 0248

The Atabapo Municipality (Spanish: Municipio Atabapo) is one of the seven municipalities (municipios) that makes up the southern Venezuelan state of Amazonas and, according to the 2011 census by the National Institute of Statistics of Venezuela, the municipality has a population of 9,169. The town of San Fernando de Atabapo is the municipal seat of the Atabapo Municipality.

== Demographics ==
The Atabapo Municipality, according to a 2007 population estimate by the National Institute of Statistics of Venezuela, has a population of 10,625 (up from 8,475 in 2000). This amounts to 7.4% of the state's population. The municipality's population density is 0.4 inhabitants per square kilometre (1.0/sq mi).

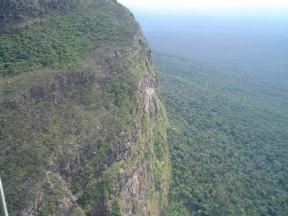
Tepuy Yapacana, Atabapo Municipality

== Government ==
The mayor of the Atabapo Municipality is Nelsón Cayupare, elected on October 31, 2004, with 38% of the vote. He replaced Nepomuceno Patiño shortly after the elections. The municipality is divided into three parishes; Ucata, Yapacana, and Caname (previous to December 18, 1997, the Atabapo Municipality contained only a single parish).
