= Delta Amacuro =

Coordinates: 10°3′N 60°48′W

Delta Amacuro Estado Delta Amacuro (Spanish)
- State
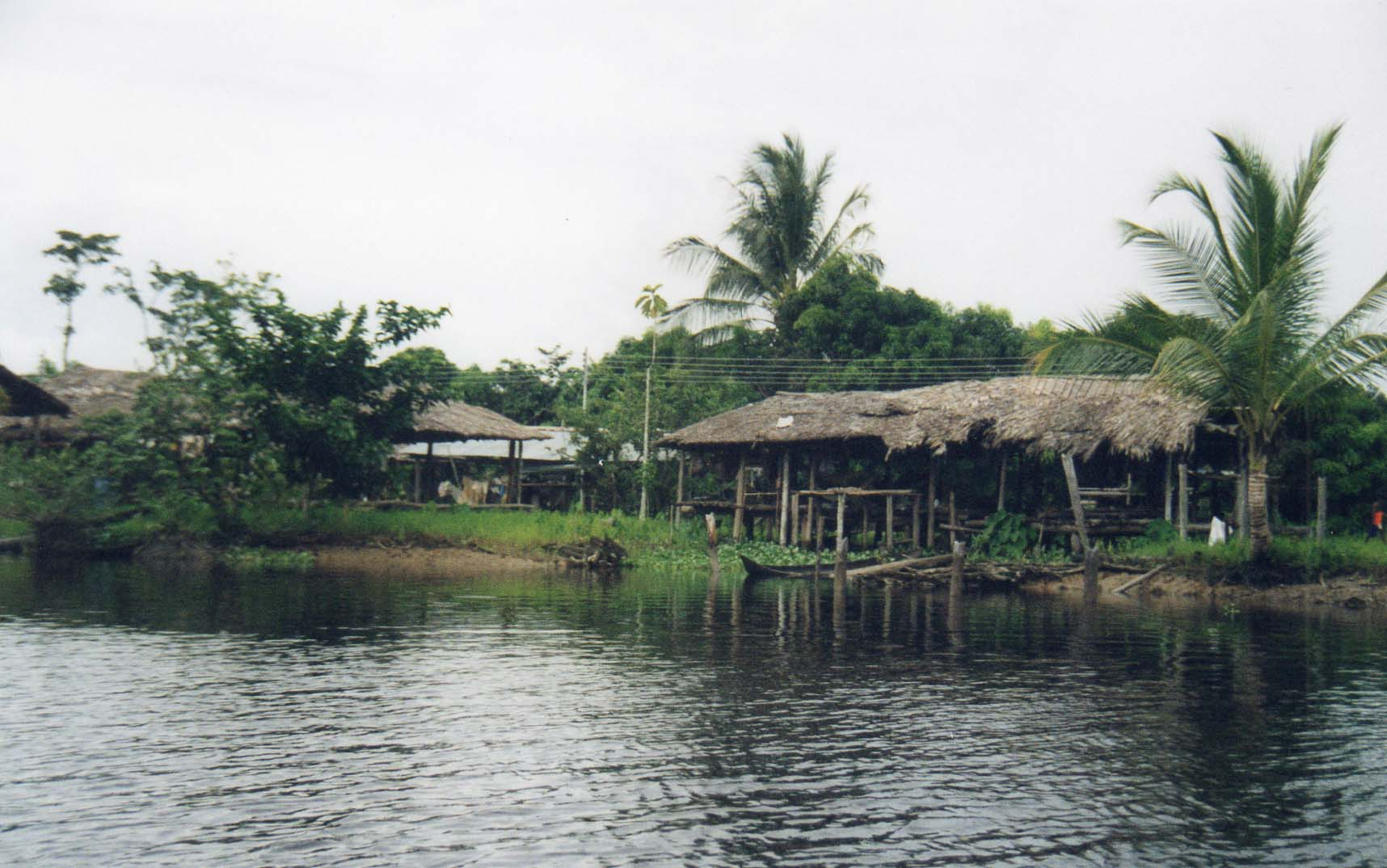
- The Orinoco River delta

- Flag Coat of arms
- Motto: La Paz en la Federación (English: The Peace in the Federation)
- Anthem: Himno del Estado Delta Amacuro
- Location within Venezuela
- Country: Venezuela
- Created: 1991^{[c]}
- Capital: Tucupita

Government
  - Body: Legislative Council
  - Governor: Loa Tamaronis

Area
  - Total: 40,200 km^{2} (15,500 sq mi)
  - Rank: 7th
- 4.39% of Venezuela

Population (2011 census)
  - Total: 171,413
  - Rank: 23rd
- 0.42% of Venezuela
- Time zone: UTC−4 (VET)
- ISO 3166 code: VE-Y
- Emblematic tree: Mangle rojo (Rhizophora mangle)
- HDI (2019): 0.696 medium · 14th of 24
- ^[c]Prior to this date, Delta Amacuro had Federal Territory status, granted in 1884.

Delta Amacuro State (Spanish: Estado Delta Amacuro, IPA: [esˈtaðo ˈðelta amaˈkuɾo]) is one of the 23 states of Venezuela, and is the location of the Orinoco Delta. The Paria Gulf and the Atlantic Ocean are to the north, Bolívar State is to the south, the Atlantic Ocean and Guyana are to the east, and Monagas State is to the west. The state capital city is Tucupita.

Delta Amacuro State covers a total surface area of 40,200 km^{2} (15,500 sq mi) and, in 2011, had a census population of 171,413.

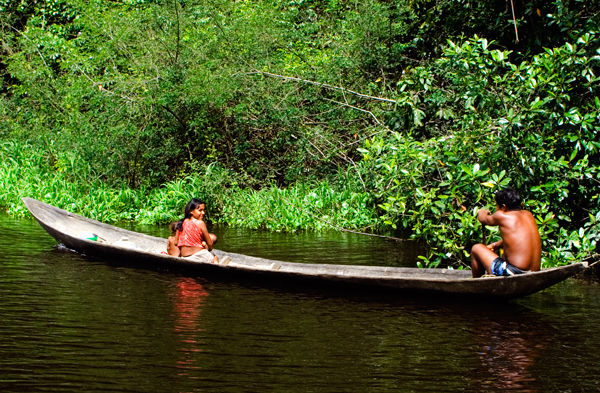
Waraos natives in the Orinoco Delta

== History ==
=== Pre-Colonial Period ===
Based on theories, anthropological evidence and oral tradition, the antecedents of human activity within this territory date from the time of the first displacements through America. Groups from the eastern slopes of the Peruvian Andes were introduced into the Lower Orinoco, they are called Kotoch or Chavinses. They developed knowledge of pottery (of which formal and technical reminiscences in ceramics are kept), and horticulture.

With time other groups established themselves in its surface, the oral Tradition stands out among them the Barrancas, who through the cultivation of the bitter yucca reached a remarkable economic development and social structure, even with agricultural surpluses that could have stimulated some type of commerce through the monopoly of its production. The expansion of this and other tribes could date back to the beginning of the first millennium, reaching the northeast coast, a large part of the central coast and the Lesser Antilles by the end of this one.

The most recent archaeological evidence of pre-Columbian human activity is attributed to the Warao Ethnic Group, according to verbally documented stories; its members joined as deserters from other hostile tribes, probably being displaced from the north of Brazil or the Eastern Savannah; currently some inhabitants of the state continue to identify themselves as part of this tribe and are a legally recognized group within its demography. They were originally fishermen, hunters and gatherers, but later became farmers with the introduction of the Chinese Ocumo from the island of Trinidad and Guyana.

The Warao people have lived in this region since well before the Europeans arrived in America. Thanks to the remoteness of the Delta, the Warao managed to keep a certain independence from the European and later criollo colonizers.

=== Spanish Colonization ===
Christopher Columbus arrived at the coast off the Delta on 1 August 1498 during his third voyage to America. He wrote about the macareo, the noise that occurs when a large river flow (the Orinoco river) meets the ocean currents.

As the Delta connects to the Orinoco, it became the point of entry from the Ocean to Guayana. His first recognition was by Alonso de Ojeda, in 1499 he documented the mouth of the Orinoco River. Vicente Yañez Pinzón in 1500 discovered the Delta and Diego de Ordaz, commander of the Order of Santiago, captain of Hernán Cortés, in 1532 climbed the Orinoco to the confluence with the Meta River.

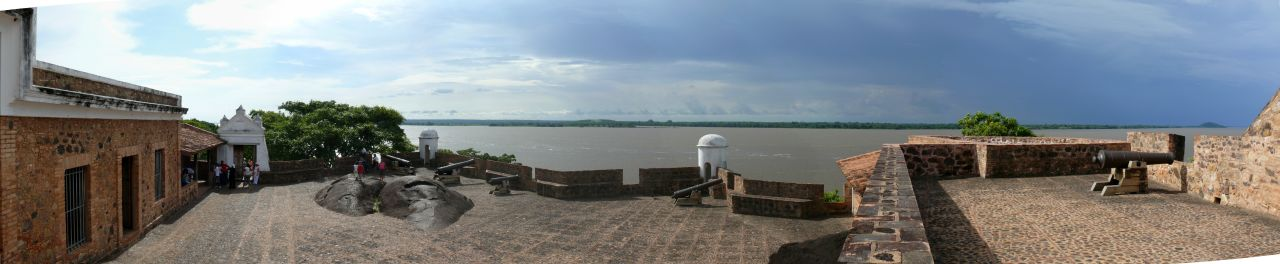
San Francisco de Asís Castle, a Spanish fortress located in the Casacoima municipality

The first documented naval expedition from this region occurred in June 1531 (38 years after the Discovery of America) by Diego de Ordaz, who decided to explore the Orinoco with several ships.3 Antonio Berrío entered the region in the 1580s. Beginning in 1598, Fernando de Berrío, Antonio Berrío's son, explored the region in his search for El Dorado. Later, Walter Raleigh explored the area in 1594, 1595 and finally on his last expedition in 1616.

The Delta as a region was part of Nueva Andalucía from 1568. It was the entry point for ships to the Orinoco.

The first religious mission was the Jesuit order which was founded in 1682. From this order, Father Gumilla dedicated himself, among other things, to documenting in detail the Warao culture from 1791 onwards. During this century, several governors, both Spanish and English (from Trinidad) tried to join the Warao and structure them into populations, which caused their desertion to the territories of Suriname.

Raleigh referred to the Tivativa as the inhabitants of that region.4 He said they were divided into two tribes, the Ciawani and the Waraweete.

Raleigh wrote: "they never eat anything that is sown or grown, and since in their homes they do not plant or raise anything, when they go to other places they refuse to eat anything that is not provided by nature without labor. They use the tops of palm trees as bread; and they kill deer, fish and pigs to supplement their diet. They also have many types of fruits that grow in the forests and a large number of birds."

Alexander von Humboldt documented in his Journeys to the Equatorial Regions that the Waraos were the only indigenous people still outside the control of the Colony. He mentioned that by 1799 some estimated their population at 6,000-7,000 people, although he believed it should be less. Humboldt said that the Guaiqueris considered their language to be related to Warao.

=== Independent Venezuela ===
The territory became part of the Guayana Province when Venezuela became independent.

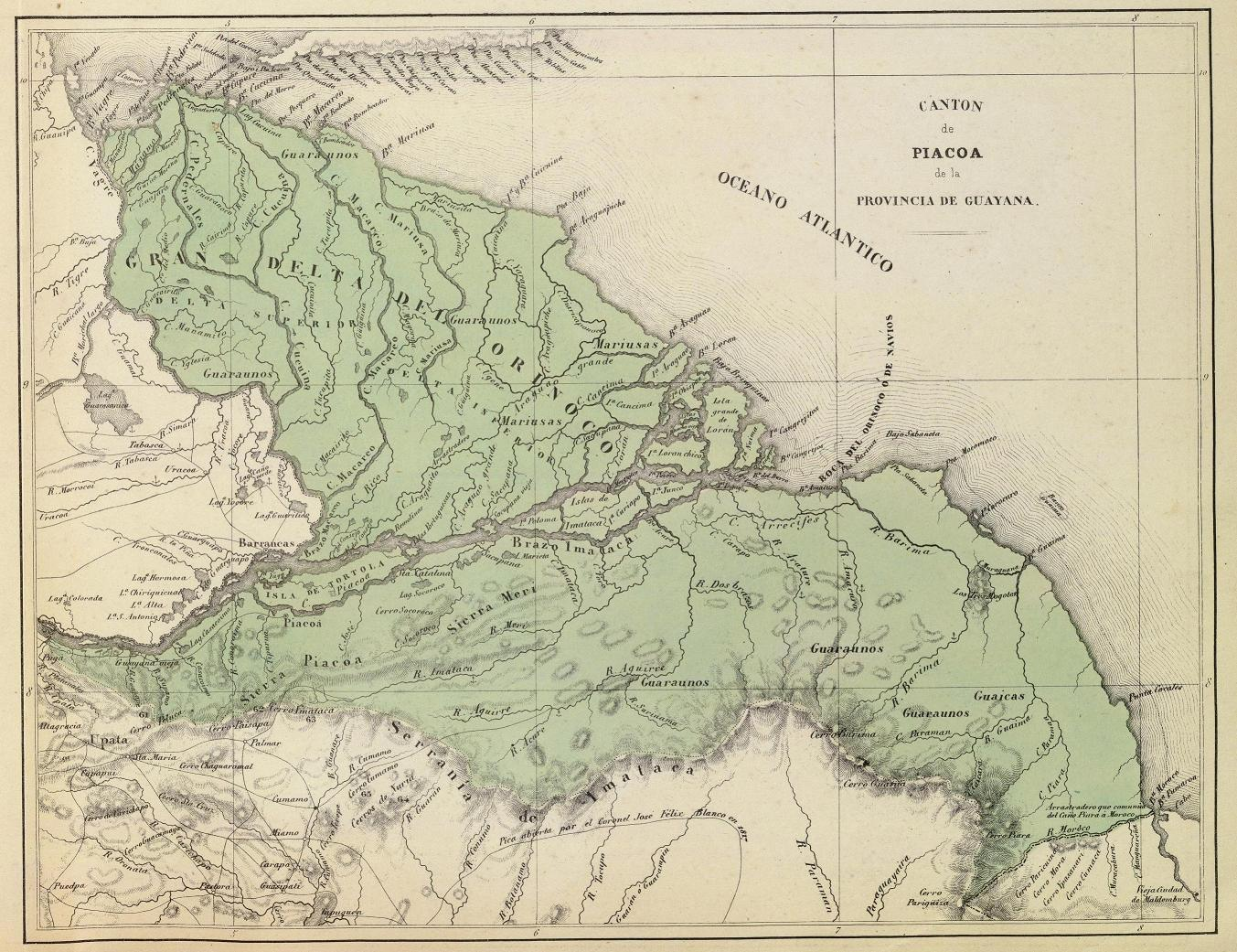
Delta Amacuro in 1840: Piacoa Canton, part of the Province of Guayana

==== 19th century ====
The settlement of non-indigenous people began in 1848 when Julián Flores, Juan Millán, Tomás Rodríguez, Regino Suiva and others founded the Forty-Eight Settlement, which is the predecessor of the present Tucupita. Later, farmers and merchants continued to settle, mostly from Margarita Island and the states of Sucre and Monagas.

Before 1884, this region was part of the Department of Zea, within the State of Guayana, which was divided in 1884.

On February 27, 1884, the delimitation of the Delta Federal Territory was constitutionally established with an area of 63,667 km^{2}, formed by the districts of Manoa and Guzmán Blanco, with Pedernales as its capital.

On October 21, 1893, the entity disappeared from the federal map, after being annexed to the state of Bolivar during international tensions with the United Kingdom over the area of the Delta claimed by British Guiana.

On October 3, 1899, through the Arbitration Award of Paris and the representation of the United States based on the Monroe Doctrine, the government of Ignacio Andrade lost to the United Kingdom 23,467 km^{2} of this region, which was annexed to British Guiana.

==== 20th Century ====
On April 26, 1901, it was restored under the name of Territorio Federal Delta Amacuro, composed of the districts of Barima and Tucupita. After this year its political division varied from districts and departments to municipalities. Its capital was moved to Tucupita, a city formerly known as Cuarenta y Ocho. During this time, multiple religious orders of Catholic affinity made their way into the region. In 1925 a new Catholic religious order, called Capuchinos del Caroní, -whose mission at that time included the Delta Amacuro Territory- founded the first of the current missions,

The Catholic missionary Barral settled in the area in the 1930s and established a mission in Guayo. In the following decades he collected information on the Warao language and published a Spanish-Warao dictionary.

From 1932 onwards, other missionaries founded new missions in San José de Tucupita, San Francisco de Guayo, Nabasanuka and Ajotejana. In 1940 the Organic Law of the Federal Territory Delta Amacuro was promulgated, which divided it into the departments of Tucupita, Pedernales and Antonio Díaz. According to the Extraordinary Official Gazette No. 4,295 of August 3, 1991, the Special Law was promulgated, giving the Territory the status of State, with the same political-territorial division as before.

On January 25, 1995, the State Legislative Assembly issued its second Law of Political Territorial Division, with the 4 current municipalities; it also annexes to the state the hamlets Nuevo Mundo, Platanal, El Triunfo and El Triunfito, previously under the jurisdiction of the State of Bolivar.

In the last decade, Delta Amacuro has seen an important migration of criollo Venezuelans looking for jobs in the oil sector.

== Geography ==
The state of Delta Amacuro has an extension of 40,200 kilometers, which represents a little more than 4.6% of the national territory of Venezuela. It is strategically important because it is one of the few territories with direct access to the Atlantic Ocean (most of the Venezuelan coast is made up of waters in the Caribbean Sea or Sea of the Antilles).

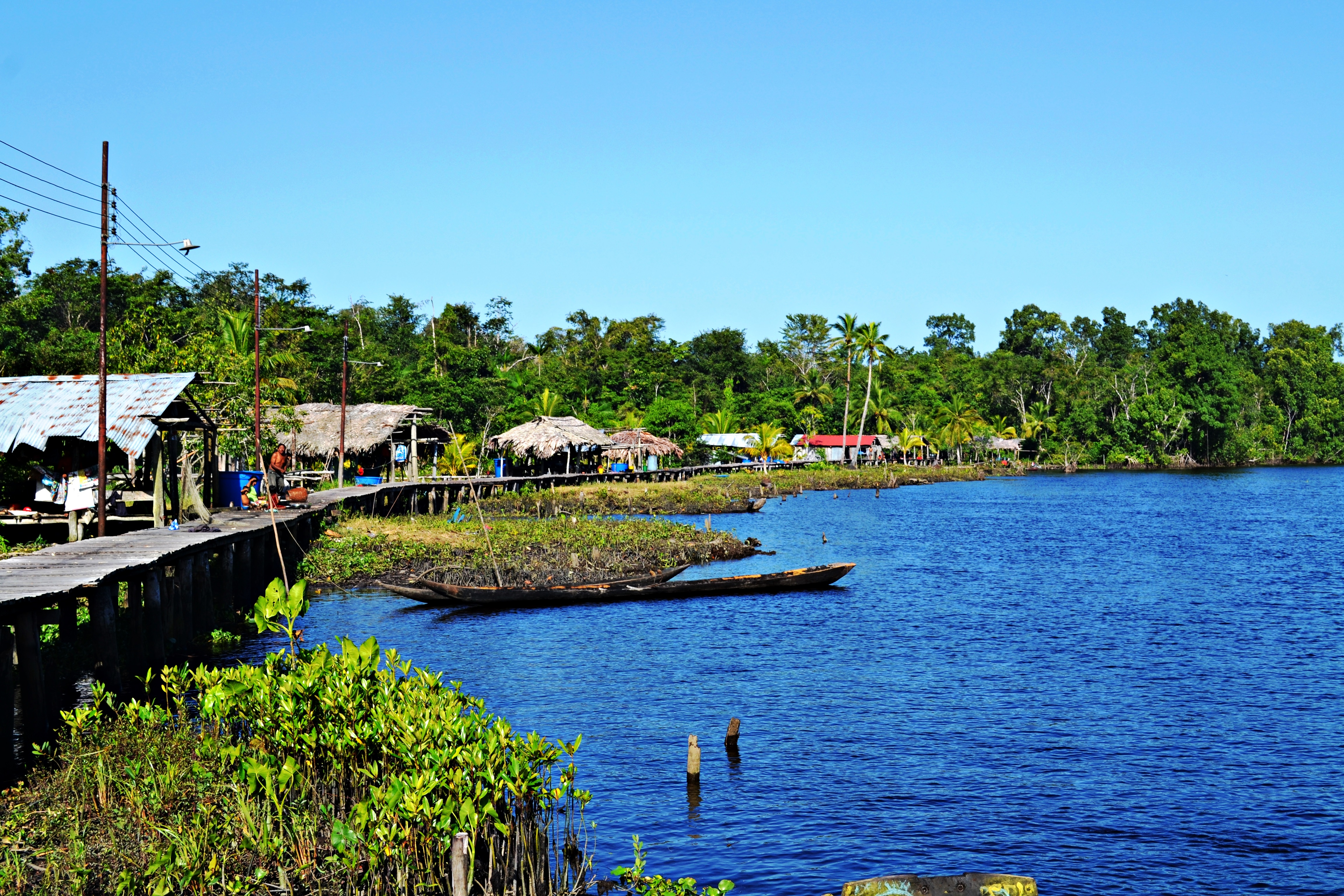
Tropical rainforest.

The region is located in the extreme east of Venezuela and its main geographical feature is the Orinoco River Delta (the most important and longest in Venezuela) with 18,810 square kilometers and the so-called Serrania del Imataca which has 21390 square kilometers and extends even to the neighboring states of Bolivar and Monagas.

Four types of plant formations can be recognized: Forest mainly of mangrove and with more importance in the forest reserve of the Imataca, Forest mainly in the center of the state, Savannah mainly in the west of the Region and estuary in the eastern part that gives to the Atlantic Ocean. The state has its highest point in the so-called Monte Indira with 687 meters above sea level which contrasts with its lowest point in the sector of Casacoima with -48 meters above sea level.

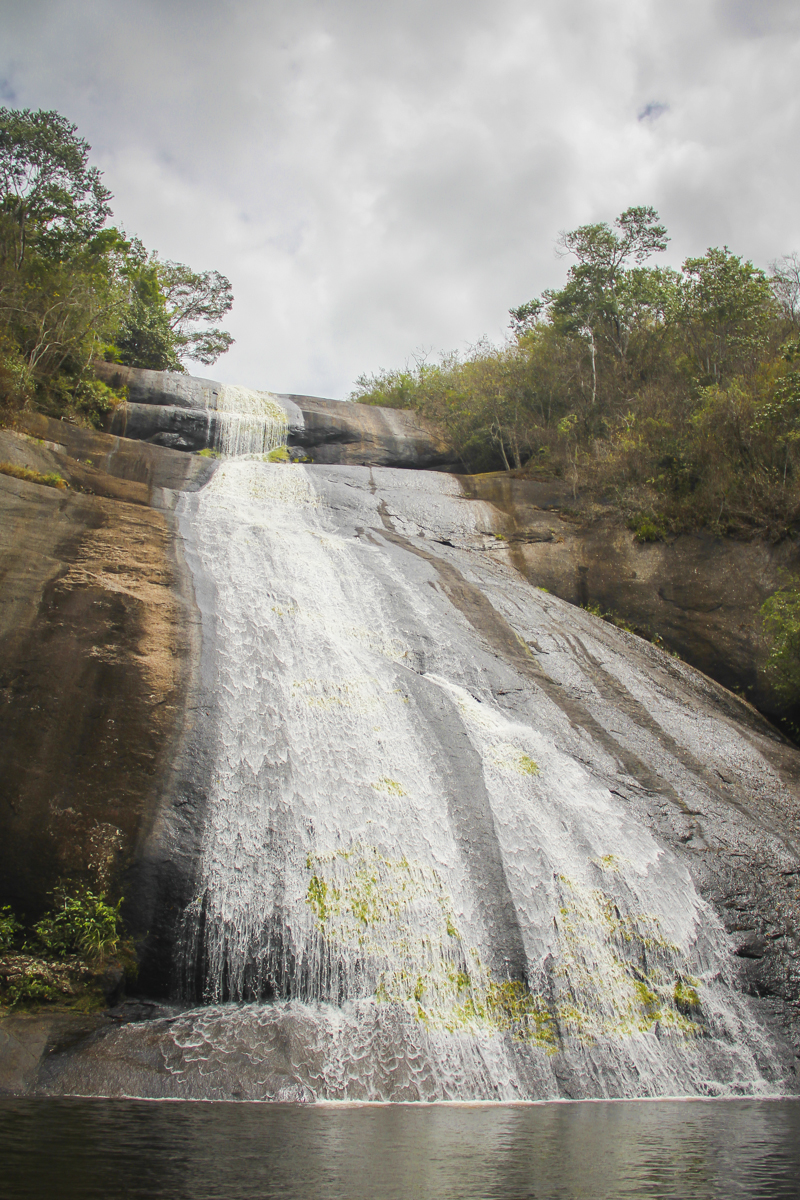
El Mono Waterfall in the Sierra de Imataca, Delta Amacuro

=== Hydrography and islands ===
The Orinoco Delta region is crossed by a multitude of rivers and streams with numerous islands including Barril Island, Borojo Island, Bongo Island, Burojoida Island, Baroco Sanuca Island, Corosimo Island, Capure Island, Caneima Island, Coboima Island, Cocuina Island, Curiapo Island, Guasi Borujo Island, Janejo Island, Jebu Cebenoco Island, Mánamo Island, Mono Island, Burojo, Cotorra, Isla de Plata, Tortola Island, Tucupita Island, Macareo, Manamito, Guara, El Cidral or Cangrejo Island, El Barco Island, Morocoto Island, Isla del Medio, Guaranoco Island, Las Islitas Island, Mysterious Island, Noina Island, Guasina Island, Sacupana Island, Tobejuba (Tobajuba) Island, Tobeima Island, Corocoro Island, Cocuina Island, Pedernales Island, Pagayos Island, Caneima Island, Remolinos Island and Remediadora Island.

==== Main rivers ====
- Orinoco River: one of the most important rivers in South America. The name of the river comes from the Otomaco Orinucu. In the Delta Amacuro the river reaches 200 km in length, in the part where the river flows into the Gulf of Paria and the Atlantic, forming a large delta branched into hundreds of branches, called caños, which cover an area of rainforest and swamp forests of between 22,500-41,000 km^{2} and 370 km at its widest point. In the rainy season, the Orinoco can increase to a width of 22 km and a depth of 100 m. The alluvial plain region north of the river, whose altitude does not exceed 100 m, is flooded during this rainy season, leaving intertropical savannah grasslands for the rest of the year.
- Barima River flows directly into the Atlantic Ocean at the mouth of the Orinoco River in (Venezuela), and is therefore sometimes considered part of the Orinoco basin.
- Yocoima River, a short river with a length of approximately 75 km, located in the municipalities of Piar and Caroní in the north of the state of Bolivar, where it forms the northern border of this federal entity with the Amacuro Delta.

=== Climate ===
Its climate is affected by the proximity to the coast and the rivers that cross it being mostly tropical rainy in the continental or internal zone but of Savannah when approaching the coast. The whole region has heavy rainfall most of the year, but it decreases in the western part of the state.

== Demography ==
Historical population
Year	Pop.	±% p.a.
1873	5,766	—
1881	9,938	+7.04%
1891	7,377	−2.94%
1920	12,262	+1.77%
1926	15,230	+3.68%
1936	19,903	+2.71%
1941	28,165	+7.19%
1950	33,648	+2.00%
1961	33,979	+0.09%
1971	48,139	+3.54%
1981	56,720	+1.65%
1990	84,564	+4.54%
2001	97,987	+1.35%
2011	165,525	+5.38%
Source: "XIV CENSO NACIONAL DE POBLACIÓN Y VIVIENDA - Resultados por Entidad Federal y Municipio del Estado Delta Amacuro" (PDF). Instituto Nacional de Estadística.

The population of the region went from only 5,766 inhabitants in 1873 to 33,648 in 1950 when it was still a federal territory. At the beginning of 1990, when it was preparing to become a state of Venezuela, it had 84,564 inhabitants, with the population estimated at 197,200 by 2017. The state is home to most of the Warao ethnic group. According to the INE census of indigenous communities, there were some 26,080 indigenous people, mainly Waraos, in the state by 2001. The Warao maintain their language, although bilingualism is becoming more widespread. The population in the main cities is composed mostly of other Venezuelans.

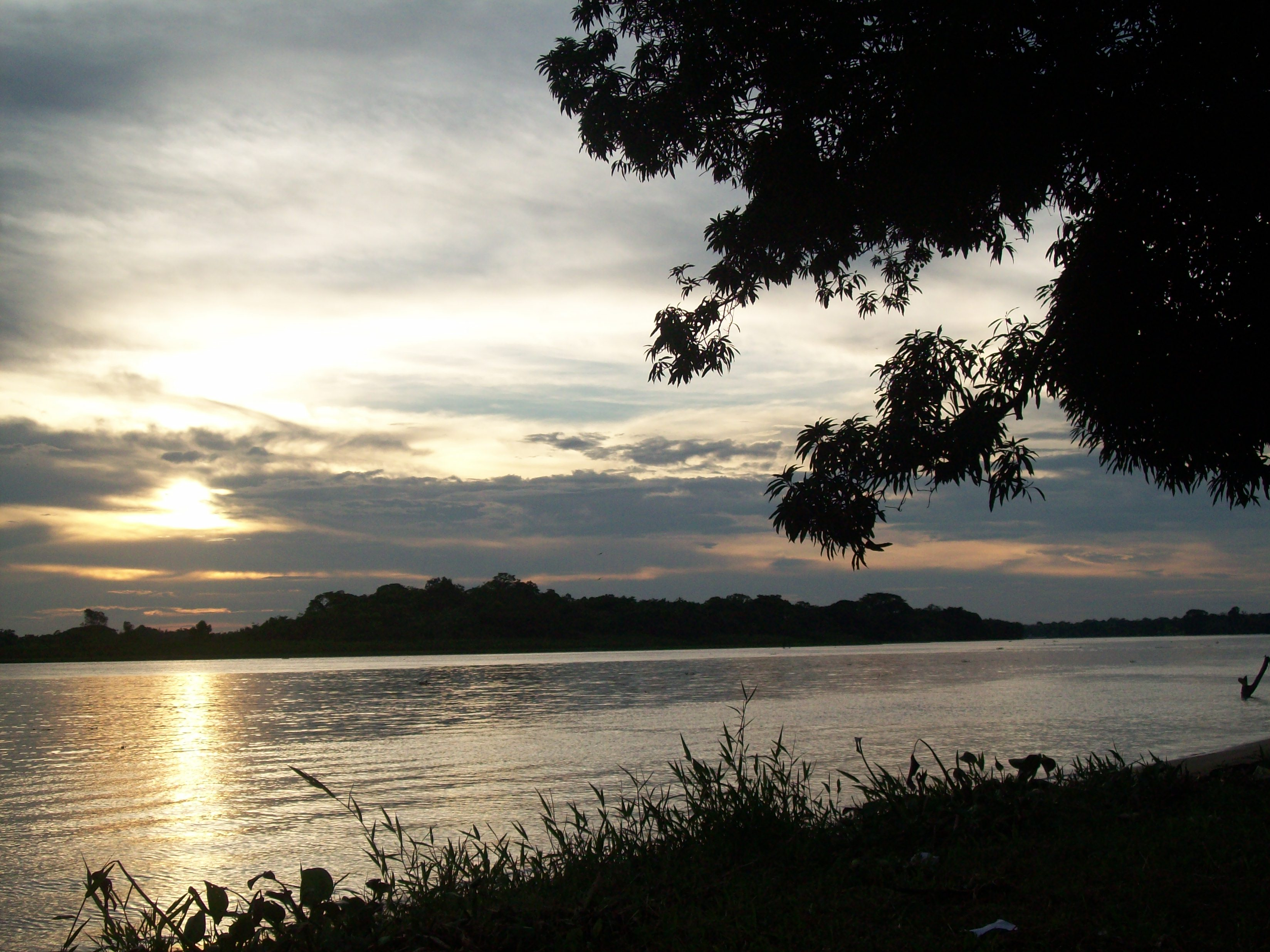
Caño Manamo, Orinoco River, Delta Amacuro

=== Race and ethnicity ===
According to the 2011 Census, the racial composition of the population was:

Racial composition	Population	%
Mestizo	—N/a	54.8
White	62,457	36.4
Black	12,011	7.0
Other race	—N/a	1.7

==== Languages ====
According to article 13 of the constitution of the State of Delta Amacuro of 2015 the official language of the State is Spanish but in recognition of the multiethnic and pluricultural condition of the region, the indigenous languages of the State are also official, highlighting in this article the fundamental use of the Warao language. According to article 14 of the same legal text, education in the state will be given in Spanish, but in the indigenous communities it will be accompanied by the respective local language, taking into account the indigenous educators to guarantee a bilingual education.

== Politics and government ==
It is an autonomous state and politically equal to the rest of the Federation, it organizes its administration and its public powers through the Constitution of the State Delta Amacuro, dictated by the Legislative Council.

=== Executive Power ===
It is composed of State Governor Delta Amacuro and a group of State Secretaries who are appointed by him and serve as his assistants in the management of the Government. The Governor is elected by the people by direct and secret ballot for a four-year term with the possibility of re-election. The Governor is the chief administrator of the state. Since its creation as a federal state by special law in 1992, Delta Amacuro State has elected its governors in direct elections. The current governor is Lizeta Hernández Abchi, a member of the United Socialist Party of Venezuela (PSUV), who has been in office since 2008.

=== Legislative power ===
The state legislature is the unicameral Legislative Council of Delta Amacuro State, elected by the people through direct and secret vote every four years, being able to be reelected for two consecutive periods. Under a system of proportional representation of the population of the state and its municipalities, the state has 7 deputies; all 7 belong to the ruling party.

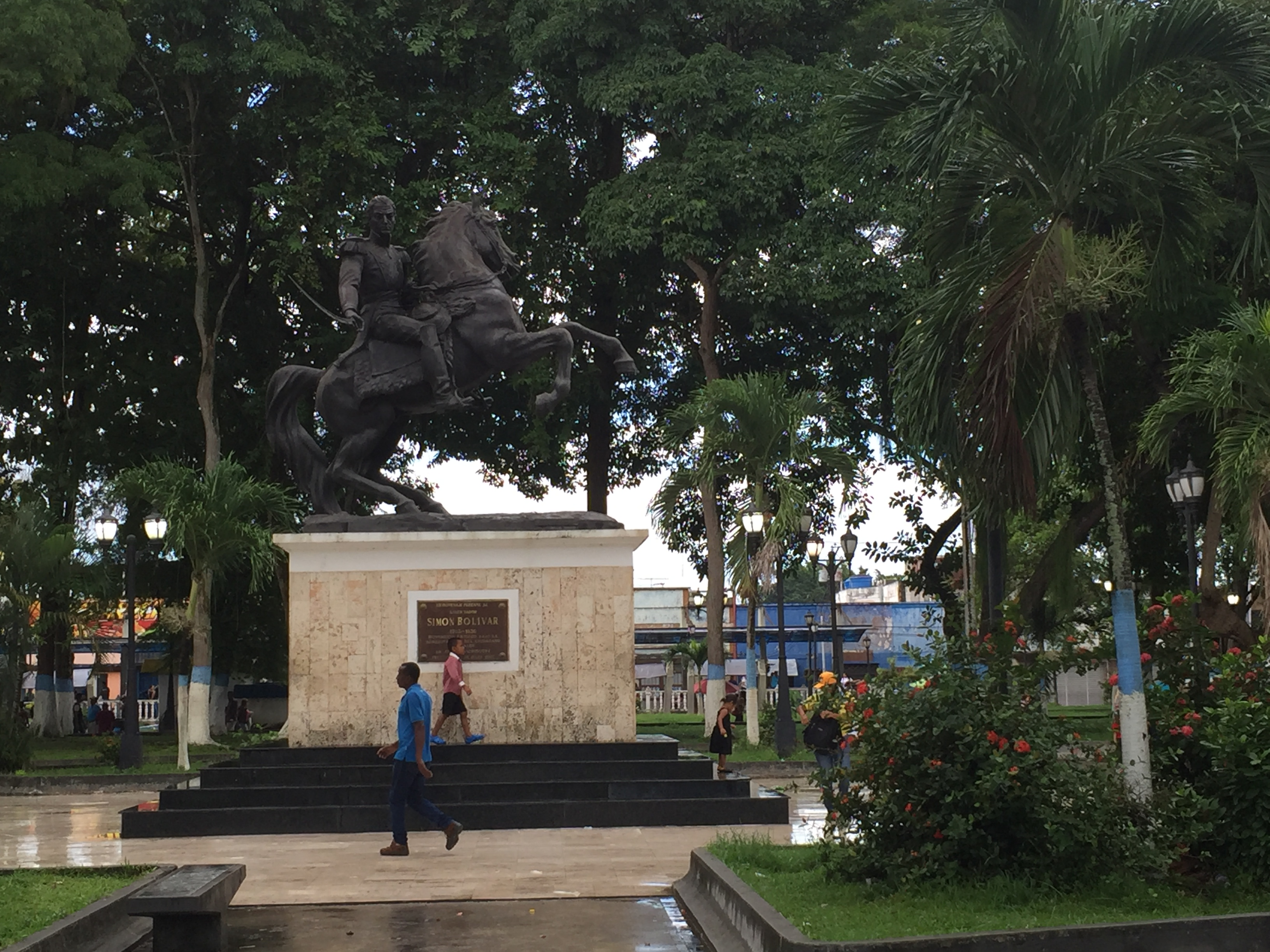
Bolívar Square, Tucupita

=== Police ===
Delta Amacuro State like the other 23 federal entities of Venezuela has its own police force called Delta Amacuro State Police (Polícia del Estado Delta Amacuro), whose general headquarters are in the city of Tucupita. The police force is supported and complemented by the National Police and the Venezuelan National Guard.

== Municipalities and municipal seats ==
Delta Amacuro State comprises four municipalities and 20 parishes.

- Tucupita Municipality: Tucupita (The Capital of the Tucupita Municipality is Tucupita). The Parishes of the Municipality Tucupita are; San José, José Vidal Marcano, Juan Millán, Leonardo Ruíz Pineda, Mariscal Antonio José de Sucre, Monseñor Argimiro García, San Rafael and Virgen del Valle.
- Antonio Díaz Municipality: Antonio Díaz (The Capital of the Municipality Antonio Díaz is Curiapo). The Parishes of the Municipality Antonio Díaz are: Curiapo, Almirante Luis Brion, Francisco Aniceto Lugo, Manuel Renaud, Padre Barral and Santos de Abelgas.
- Casacoima Municipality: Casacoima (The Capital of the Municipality Casacoima is Sierra Imataca). The Parishes of the Municipality Casacoima are: Imataca, Juan Bautista Arismendi, Manuel Piar and Rómulo Gallegos.
- Pedernales Municipality: Pedernales (The Capital of Pedernales Municipality is Pedernales). The Parishes of the Municipality Pedernales are: Pedernales and Luis Beltrán Prieto Figueroa.

Municipality	Capital	Surface km^{2}	Population 2001	Location
Antonio Díaz	Curiapo	22,746.49	19,308	
Casacoima	Sierra Imataca	2,920.69	29,200	
Pedernales	Pedernales	3,537	6,990	
Tucupita	Tucupita	10,996	72,856	

== Economy ==
Delta Amacuro is one of the poorest regions of Venezuela. The main economic activities are:

- Agriculture: rice, maize, cattle, chickens, coconuts, bananas, cassava, pineapples, hearts of palm.
- Industry: oil products.
- Fishing
- Forestry: cuajo, mangrove, moriche palm, seje, yagrumo.
- Mining: oil, gold, peat.

=== Tourism ===
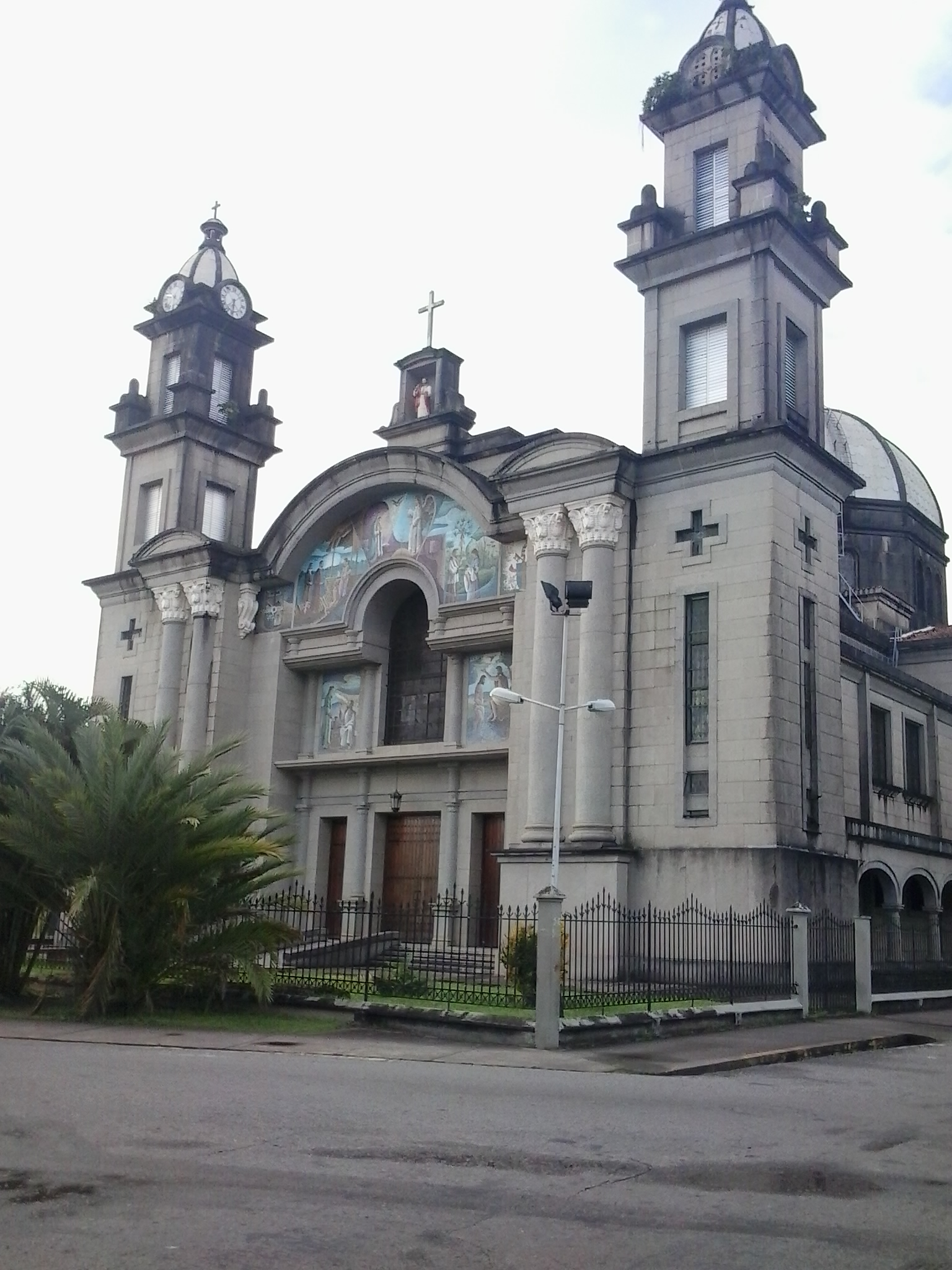
Tucupita Cathedral

There is also some limited tourism in the area. The State of Delta Amacuro stands out for its natural landscapes, rivers, islands and streams, its tropical forest and variety of animals that can be observed in their natural habitat.

==== Natural Patrimonies ====
- Caño Araguaimujo.
- Caño Macareo.
- Manamo pipe.
- Guasina and Sacupana Islands.
- Delta Orinoco-Mariusa National Park.
- Saltos de Toro and Acoima.
- The Casacoima waterfall: located in the jurisdiction of the Piacoa farmhouse, in the Sierra Imataca, it can be admired from afar as it stands out among the green foliage of the mountain.
- Imataca Forest Reserve

==== Outstanding buildings ====
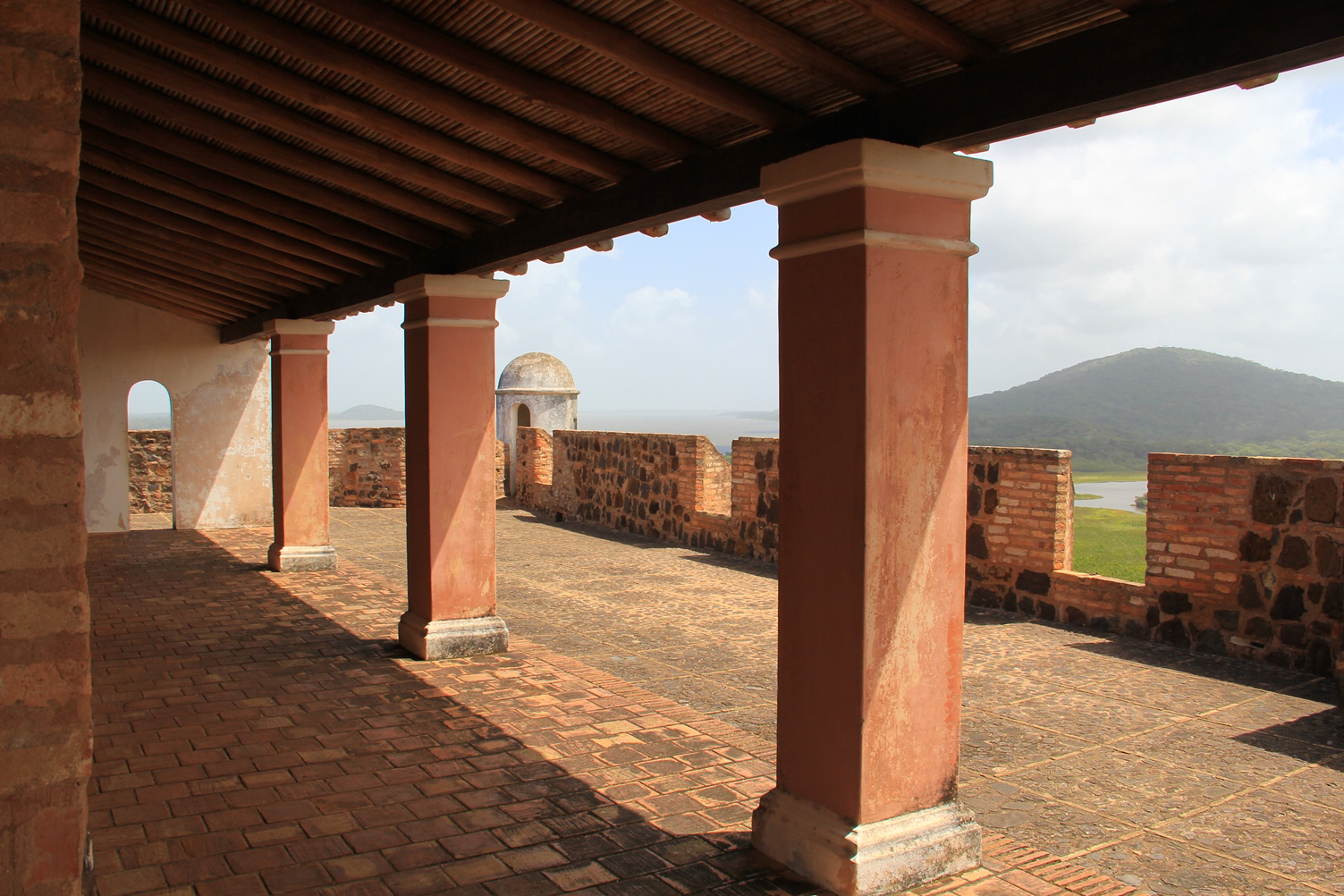
San Diego de Alcalá Castle, Casacoima Municipality

- The fort of St. Francis of Assisi.
- San Diego de Alcalá Castle.
- The Castles of Guiana.
- Indigenous Racherias.
- Malecón Manamo Walk

== Sport ==
In the state various sports are practiced, among the facilities that are under the administration of the Regional Sports Institute of Delta Amacuro State we can mention:

- Polideportivo del municipio Tucupita (Pinto Salinas Sports Complex, for Athletics and Football)
- Isaías Látigo Chávez Stadium in Tucupita (also called 23 de Enero Stadium, suitable for the Waraos baseball team of Delta Amacuro).
- Efráin Zapata Stadium, Tucupita (baseball)
- Pedro Elias Montero Stadium, Tucupita
- Los Cocos Stadium.
- Santa Marta de Cocuina Stadium.

== See also ==
- States of Venezuela
