= 2019 shipping of humanitarian aid to Venezuela =

- Part of the crisis in Venezuela and Venezuelan presidential crisis
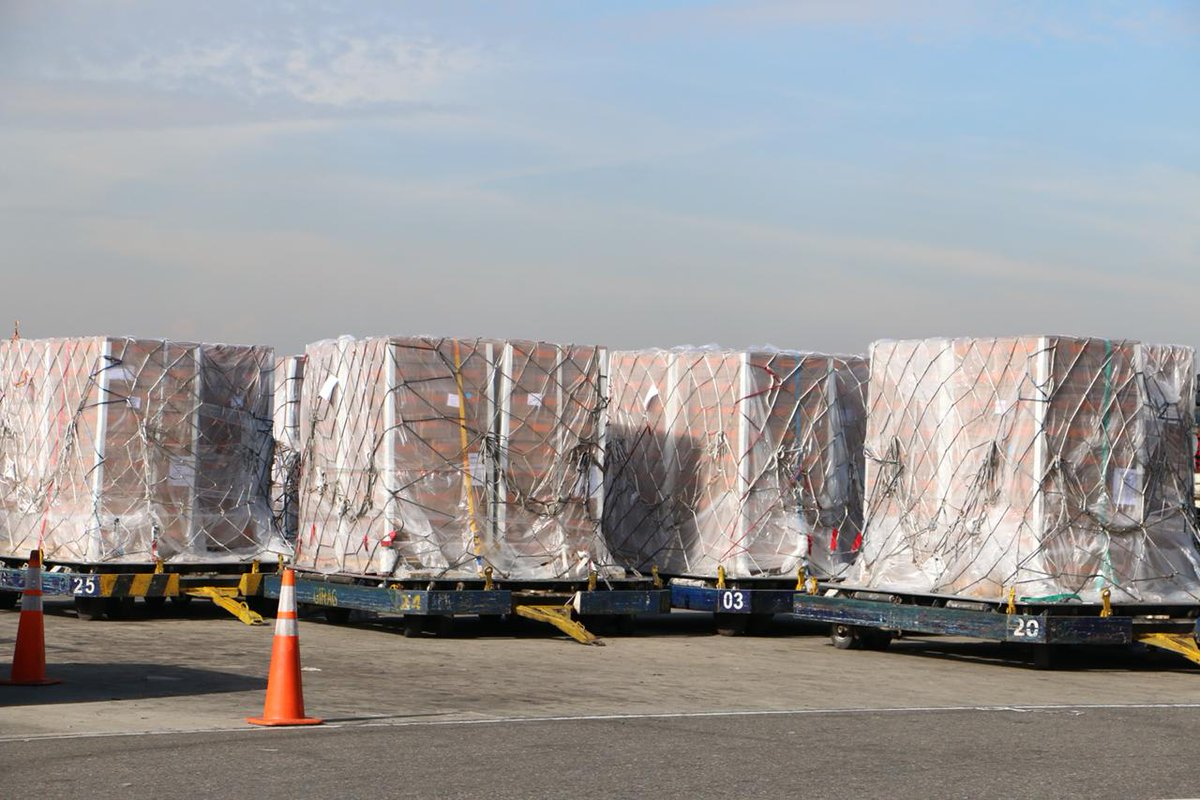
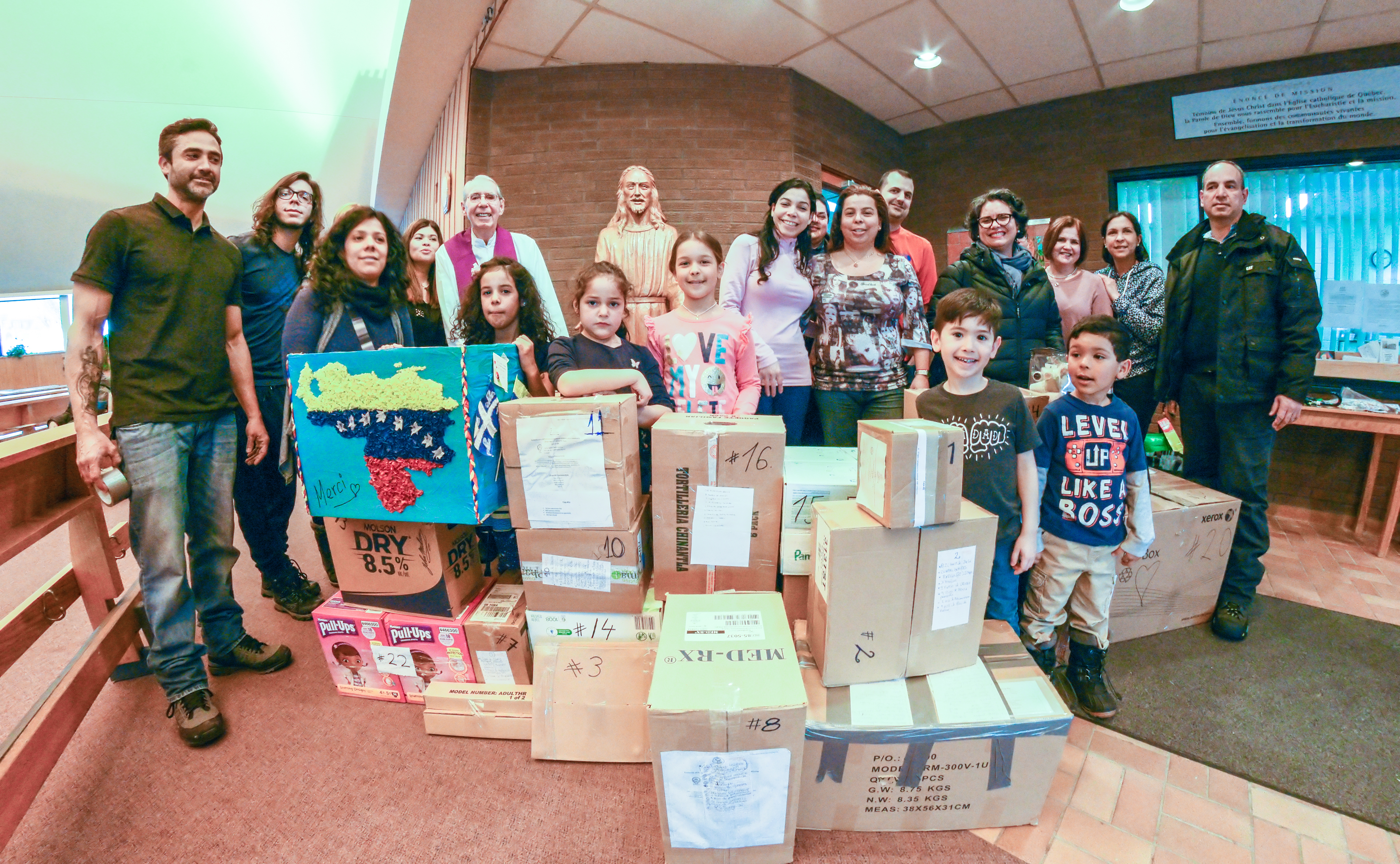
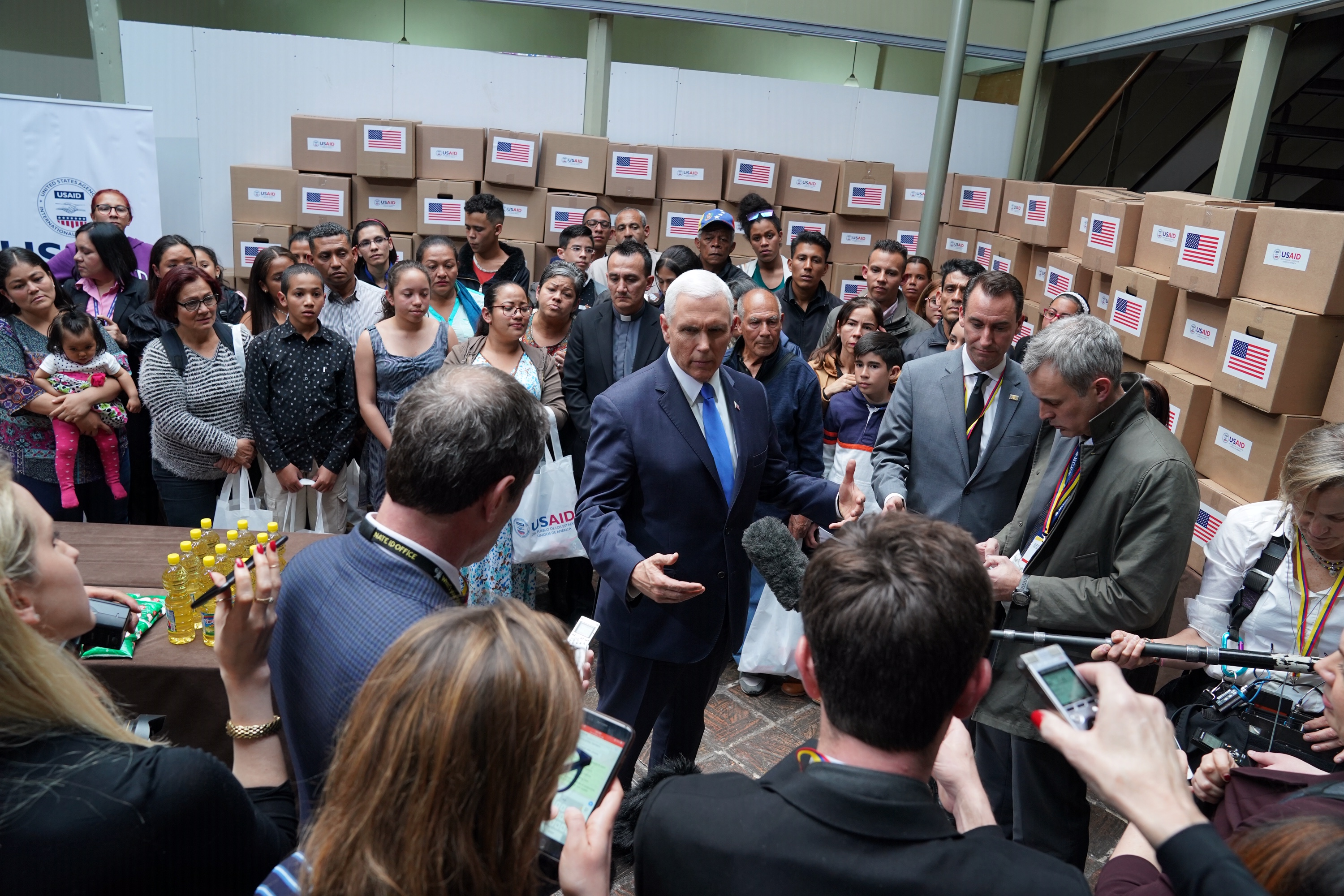
- Top to bottom, left to right: Aid for Venezuela sent by the United States to Colombia. Packages to be sent to Venezuela prepared in Canada. United States Vice President Mike Pence visiting Colombia with boxes.
- Date: 11 February 2019; Continuous donations since February 2019
- Location: Venezuela

Parties
Maduro government International support	Guaidó government International support

During the 2019 presidential crisis between the Venezuelan governments of Nicolás Maduro and Juan Guaidó, a coalition of Colombia, Brazil, the United States and the Netherlands attempted to bring essential goods as a response to shortages in Venezuela. The three main bases used for the operation were: the Colombian city of Cúcuta, the Brazilian state of Roraima, (specifically Boa Vista and Pacaraima), and the island of Curaçao, of the Kingdom of the Netherlands.

Shortages in Venezuela have occurred since the presidency of Hugo Chávez, with the country experiencing a scarcity rate of 24.7% in January 2008. Shortages became commonplace in the country in 2012. Since Maduro attained the presidency in 2013, he has denied that there was a humanitarian crisis in the country and refused international aid, making conditions in Venezuela worse. Maduro blamed the shortages on an economic war being waged by foreign adversaries, such as the United States, and claims that the problems in Venezuela are due to the economic sanctions against the state-run oil company PDVSA.

Guaidó and Miguel Pizarro made partial delivery of the first shipment of humanitarian aid to the Association of Health Centers (ASSOVEC) on 11 February 2019.

On 23 February 2019, a joint operation from all coalition countries by land and sea attempted to deliver humanitarian aid to Venezuela. At the Colombia–Venezuela border, the caravans were tear-gassed or shot at with rubber bullets by Venezuelan personnel as they crossed bridges and ultimately blocked. According to a report released by the Office of the Inspector General at the U.S. Agency for International Development only 8 out of 368 tons of aid reached the country. In a December 2019 survey by Venezuelan pollster Meganalisis, 85.5% of respondents said that they did not receive support from international humanitarian aid, 7.9% said they did receive aid and 6.5% were unsure if they received humanitarian aid.

== Shortages in Venezuela ==
The National Assembly of Venezuela, with an opposition majority, declared a "humanitarian health crisis" on 24 January 2016, in view of "the serious shortage of medicines, medical supplies and deterioration of the humanitarian infrastructure", demanding from the government of Nicolás Maduro "guarantee immediately access to the list of essential medicines that are basic, indispensable and imprescindible and must be accessible at all times".

In a September 2017 Al Jazeera interview with president of the Constituent Assembly Delcy Rodríguez, she stated, "I have denied and continue denying that Venezuela has a humanitarian crisis". As a result, international intervention in Venezuela would not be justified. She also described statements by Venezuelans calling for international assistance as "treasonous".

On 18 October 2018, the United States sent the USNS Comfort hospital ship to South America to assist those affected by the Venezuelan refugee crisis. The main goal was to relieve health systems in neighboring countries which faced the arrival of thousands of Venezuelan migrants. Three months later on 29 January 2019, the United States announced its intention to open a humanitarian corridor in Venezuela.

In a February 2019 BBC News interview with correspondent Orla Guerin, President Maduro has stated that "Venezuela is not a country of famine. It has very high levels of nutrients and access to food". He also claimed that the United States was intending to create a humanitarian crisis in order to justify a military intervention there. Joint studies shared that same month by ENCOVI, a group of researchers from Andrés Bello Catholic University, Central University of Venezuela and Simón Bolívar University, showed that in Venezuelan households, multidimensional poverty affected 51%, 80% suffered from food insecurity and 90% did not have an income to purchase any food.

=== Creation of the coalition ===
On 2 February 2019, Juan Guaidó, the National Assembly-declared acting president, announced the existence of a "humanitarian aid coalition" that comes from Colombia, Brazil and a Caribbean island.

On 5 February 2019 the foreign ministers of the United States, Brazil and Colombia met in the White House, in which Secretary of State Mike Pompeo and National Security Advisor John R. Bolton were also present to discuss the issue of possible humanitarian aid. In their official message they showed that the opposition government of Guaidó was willing to support them in the land entry to Venezuela.

Guaidó called the operation a test of the military: "In a few weeks they will have to choose if they let much needed aid into the country, or if they side with Nicolas Maduro." Guaidó also warned that the Maduro administration had plans to "steal the products for humanitarian purposes that entered the country". This included plans to distribute these products through the government's food distribution program CLAP—a program from which, according to the 2017 Venezuelan Attorney General and Mexican prosecutors, Maduro personally profits. (Note: Luisa Ortega Díaz, Chief Prosecutor of Venezuela from 2007 to 2017, revealed that Maduro profited from the food crisis. CLAP made contracts with Group Grand Limited, a Mexican entity owned by Maduro through frontmen. Group Grand Limited would sell foodstuffs to CLAP and receive government funds.)

=== VoluntariosXVenezuela ===
In mid-February, Guaidó reported that a web page called www.voluntariosxvenezuela.com had been set up for the registration of any person who wanted to volunteer to enter the humanitarian aid planned for 23 February. Days later, in the act of swearing in of thousands of volunteers present in the parking lot of the headquarters of the newspaper El Nacional, Guaidó indicated that in "a few hours" some 600,000 Venezuelans had already registered; in addition, several guilds among them belonging to the transport and health sectors, demonstrated at the event to show their support for the movement.

Between 12 and 13 February, users of state-run internet provider CANTV that tried to access the website were victims of phishing schemes. This manipulation was denounced as a technique to identify dissidents to the government. Following the phishing incident, the official site was completely blocked for CANTV users on 16 February.

== February 2019 effort ==
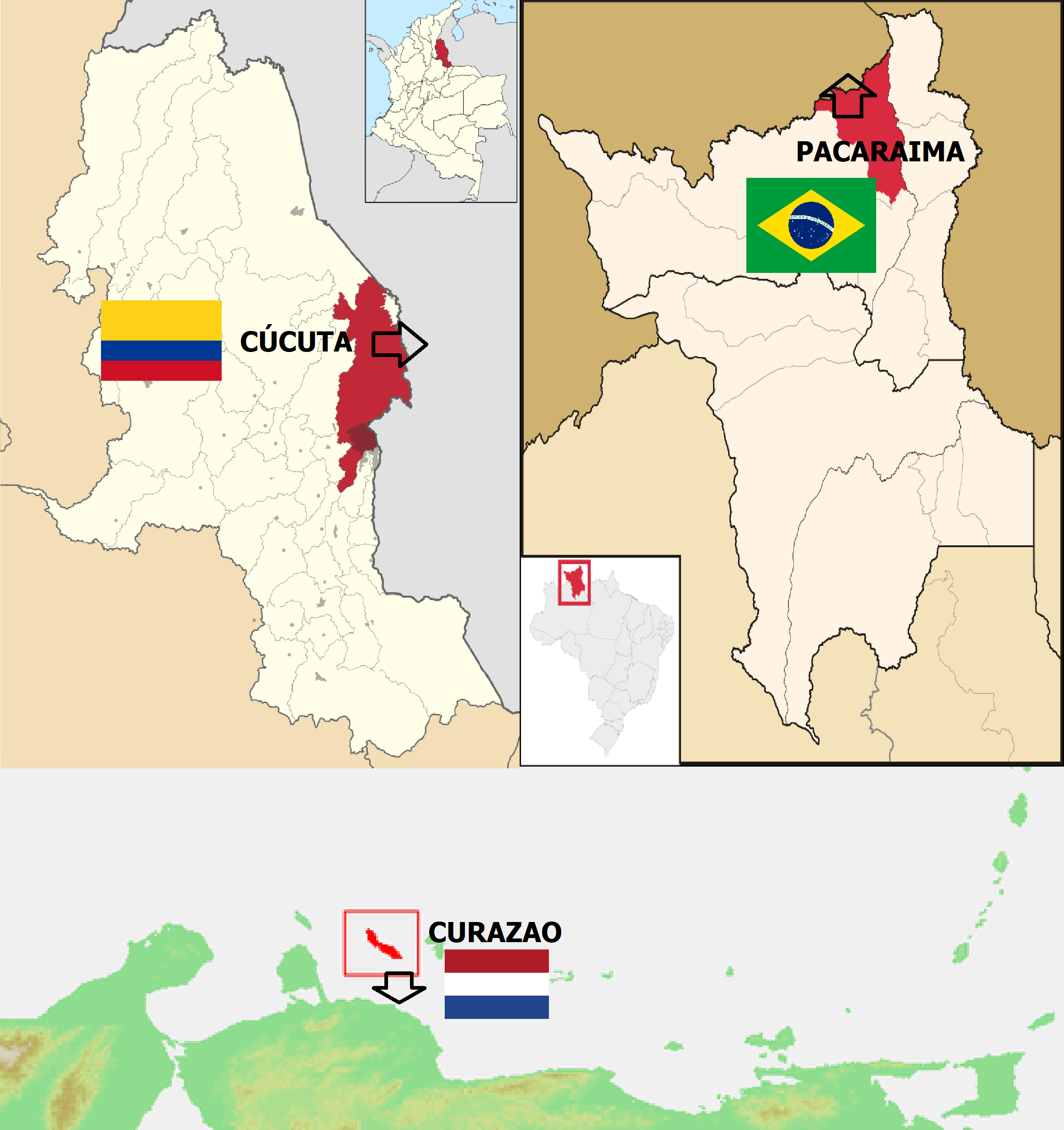
Location of the humanitarian aid points outside of Venezuela

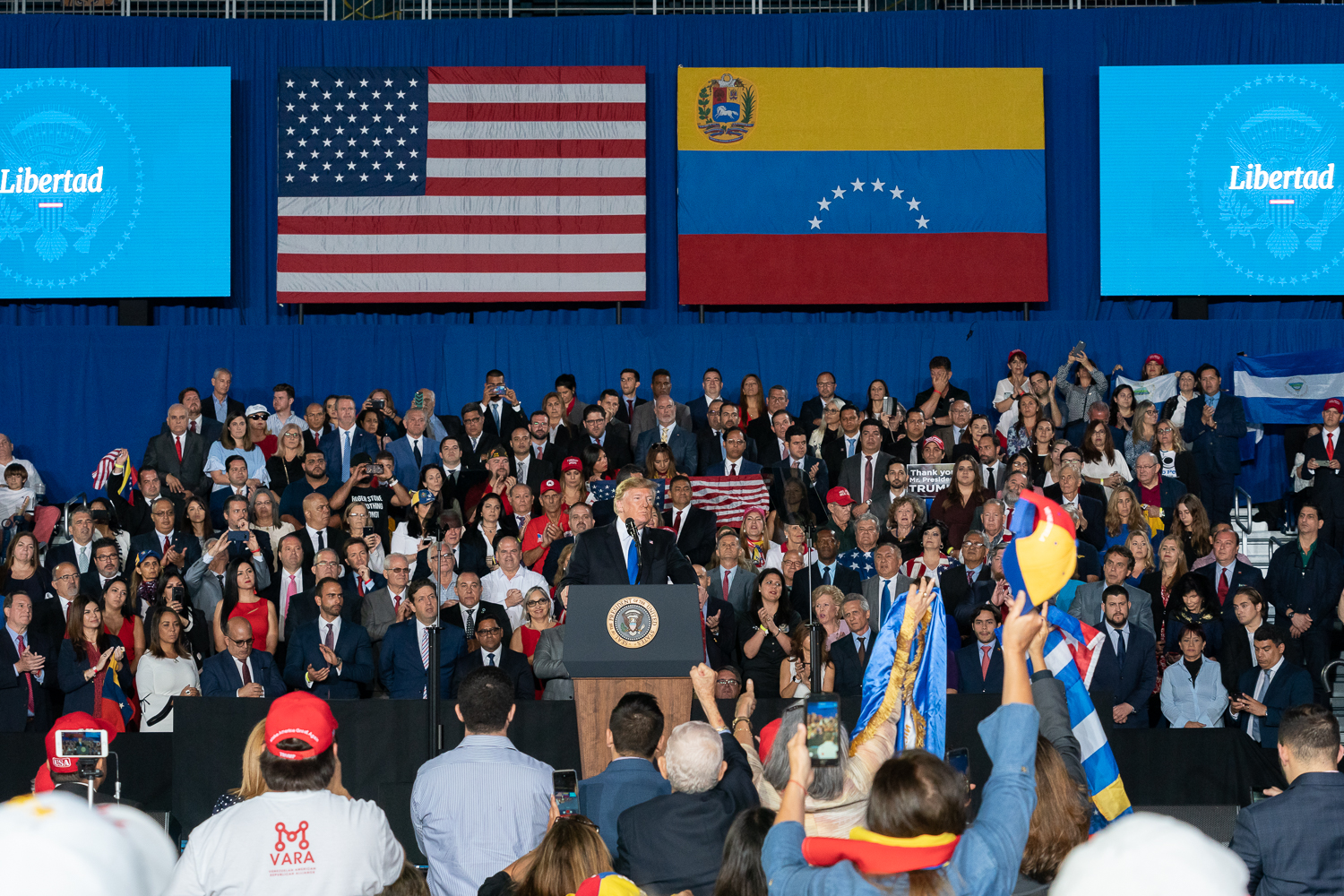
The U.S. President Donald Trump delivers remarks to the Venezuelan American community at the Florida International University Ocean Bank Convocation Center Monday, in Miami, Florida.

According to France 24, Guaidó has made bringing humanitarian aid to the "hundreds of thousands of Venezuelans who could die if aid does not arrive" a priority, and a test of the military's allegiance. He also requested aid from the United Nations. Guaidó said Venezuela's neighbors, in a "global coalition to send aid to Venezuela", will help get humanitarian aid and medicine into the country; products will be shipped to neighboring ports and brought overland via convoys. Guaidó began to lead nationwide demonstrations in early February, demanding the entrance of humanitarian aid into Venezuela, with hundreds of thousands of Venezuelans protesting in support.

The administration of Nicolás Maduro deployed police officers at all land borders beginning on 5 February; in response, the United States threatened to send military personnel to Colombia and Brazil to protect those in charge of delivering the aid. Shortly after the announcement that international humanitarian aid would enter via the Colombia–Venezuela border, PSUV politician and former elite policeman Freddy Bernal appeared at the border with members of the armed forces and the FAES.

On 6 February, humanitarian aid from the United States arrived in Colombia, to be delivered and distributed in Venezuela. That same day, Brazilian Foreign Minister Ernesto Araújo hinted that the base of operations of humanitarian aid in Brazil would be Pacaraima. In parallel, the government of Nicolás Maduro blocked the Tienditas International Bridge with cargo containers, already closed since its completion in 2016, which connects Cúcuta and the Venezuelan municipality of Ureña.

The next day, as the Colombian government transported cargo to Cúcuta, a group of Venezuelan refugees met them with support signs with the phrase "Ayuda humanitaria ya" ("Humanitarian aid now"). As the first trucks with aid, escorted by Colombian police, approached the blocked bridge on 7 February, human rights activists received them, and Venezuela's communications minister, Jorge Rodriguez said there was a plot between Colombia, the CIA and exiled Venezuelan politician Julio Borges to oust Maduro.

While Guaidó attempted to secure international aid, Maduro shipped over 100 tons of aid to Cuba following a tornado that devastated Havana. Under case file SC-2017-003, the Supreme Tribunal of Justice of Venezuela in exile announced the authorization for the entry of an international military coalition to secure the entry and protection of humanitarian aid to Venezuela.

Maduro voiced his opinions about why he had denied international aid, stating "With humanitarian aid they want to treat us like beggars ... in Venezuela we have the capacity to take care of our children and women. There is no humanitarian crisis here." In a later BBC interview, Maduro said, "[t]he Ku Klux Klan that governs the White House today wants to seize Venezuela" and that "Venezuela is not a country of famine. It has very high levels of nutrients and access to food." As events unfolded, Venezuelan Vice President Delcy Rodríguez claimed that humanitarian aid provided by the United States was "carcinogenic" and part of a plot to kill Venezuelan citizens. She also claimed that "this so-called food from the United States aims to poison our population with chemicals" and described it as "biological weapons". USAID administrator Mark Green described the allegations as "absurd". Venezuelan deputy and medic José Manuel Olivares dismissed her claims, clarifying that "the aid has quality control and sanitary registry of Colombia, Brazil and the United States." Delcy's remarks were also dismissed by the United States, saying that the Maduro government "would go to any length to lie and deny reality".

Guaidó issued an 11-day ultimatum to the Venezuelan Armed Forces on 12 February, stating that humanitarian aid will enter Venezuela on 23 February and that the armed forces "will have to decide if it will be on the side of the Venezuelans and the Constitution or the usurper".

Leaders of Pemon groups stated on 9 February that they would not abide by Maduro's orders and would allow aid into Venezuela through its border with Brazil. Mayor Emilio Gonzalez of Gran Sabana stated that "Neither the National Guard not the government can stop this" while another Pemon leader Angel Paez stated "If humanitarian aid arrives and is prevented from entering, we will suspend the entry of government trucks too." Former Amazonas governor Liborio Guarulla announced on 14 February that the humanitarian aid started entering in the Amazonas state through the Guainía, Atabapo and Orinoco rivers with help of NGO's, the Colombian government and indigenous organizations. A plane of the Brazilian Air Force carrying humanitarian aid to Venezuelans traveled to Boa Vista on 20 February, capital of the border state of Roraima providing 23 tons of powdered milk and 500 first-aid kits. Brazil pledged to make humanitarian aid available at the town of Pacaraima on its side of the Brazil–Venezuela border so Venezuelans can drive it into their country.

Humanitarian campsites were installed in at least ten states across Venezuela by 17 February; the Directorate General of Military Counterintelligence detained seven people that were installing the awnings, chairs and sound equipment of the humanitarian campsite in Maracay. Maduro's government closed airways and its maritime borders with the Dutch Caribbean islands of Aruba, Bonaire, and Curaçao on 19 February, in a move that Curaçao officials say is to prevent aid from entering.

British businessman and philanthropist Richard Branson produced a charity concert called Venezuela Aid Live on 22 February to raise funds for humanitarian aid and raise awareness of the crisis in Venezuela. The Maduro government responded by saying it would hold a rival concert called "Hands off Venezuela" on the Simón Bolívar International Bridge on 22 February.

The Constituent Assembly President, Diosdado Cabello, threatened that any planes that tried to bring aid into the country would be shot down.

=== Incidents ===
==== Brazilian border ====
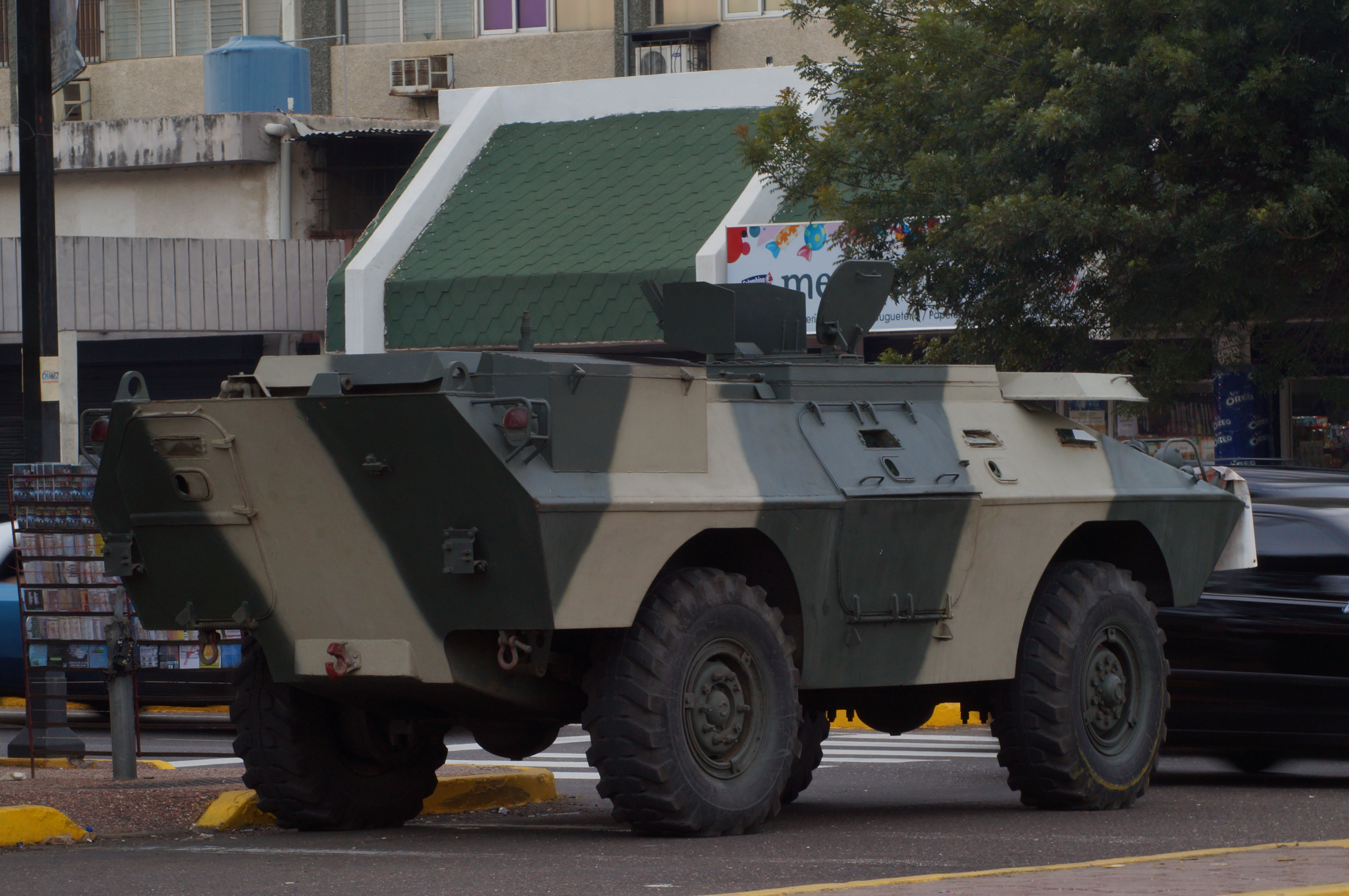
Venezuelan Dragoon 300s were deployed in Gran Sabana, near Pemon areas

Humanitarian aid was stockpiled on the Brazilian border, with the intent to bring it into Venezuela. On 20 February, Dragoon 300 armoured fighting vehicles of the Armored Cavalry Squadron were seen entering the Gran Sabana region. Groups of indigenous Pemon peoples blocked the entry of the military vehicles into the region, and members of armed forces loyal to Maduro fired upon them with live ammunition on 22 February. Fifteen Pemon were injured, four seriously, and two Pemon were killed. The injured were transferred to Brazil due to the shortage of medical supplies in the Venezuelan hospital of Santa Elena de Uairén. Following the crackdown, indigenous groups detained thirty-six soldiers and held them in the jungle. Deputy Américo de Grazia, denounced the lack of medicine and ambulances to transport the wounded.

Near the Brazil–Venezuela border, more than 2,000 indigenous people from Gran Sabana gathered to assist with the entrance of international aid. Venezuelan authorities issued a capture order of the mayor of Gran Sabana and of the Pemon chieftains, accusing them of rebellion. The Venezuelan National Guard repressed demonstrations near Brazil, while colectivos attacked protesters in San Antonio del Táchira and Ureña, leaving at least four dead and about 20 injured. Former governor Andrés Velásquez declared that fourteen people were killed and that many of them had gunshots wounds in their heads, indicating involvement of snipers. He further explained that "many have died due to lack of attention because the Santa Elena hospital does not have blood, saline solution, reactives nor oxygen, or operating rooms to intervene the patients", that the people died bleeding and the hospital personnel could not do anything to help them. Two ambulances carrying dead and wounded crossed the Brazil–Venezuela border and took them to the Roraima General Hospital, in Boa Vista, where medic records documented that everyone had gunshots wounds. US senator Marco Rubio declared that Cuban agents directed repression in Ureña.

Romel Guzamana, a representative of the indigenous community in Gran Sabana, stated that at least 25 Pemon were killed in what NTN24 described as a "massacre" by Venezuelan troops.

Colectivos and the Venezuelan National Guard killed at least four and injured twenty-four more during border conflicts in Santa Elena de Uairén early on 23 February. A Venezuelan army post near Santa Elena de Uairén was attacked with molotov cocktails and stones. Aid trucks destined to travel from Brazil into Venezuela did not enter Venezuela and returned to their departure points. The Brazilian Army reported that Venezuelan authorities fired live ammunition at those attempting to accept aid and that tear gas from Venezuela was fired into the Brazilian border city of Pacaraima. By the end of the conflict, Romel Guzamana, a representative of the indigenous community in Gran Sabana, stated that at least 25 Pemon were killed in what NTN24 described as a "massacre" by Venezuelan troops.

==== Colombian border ====
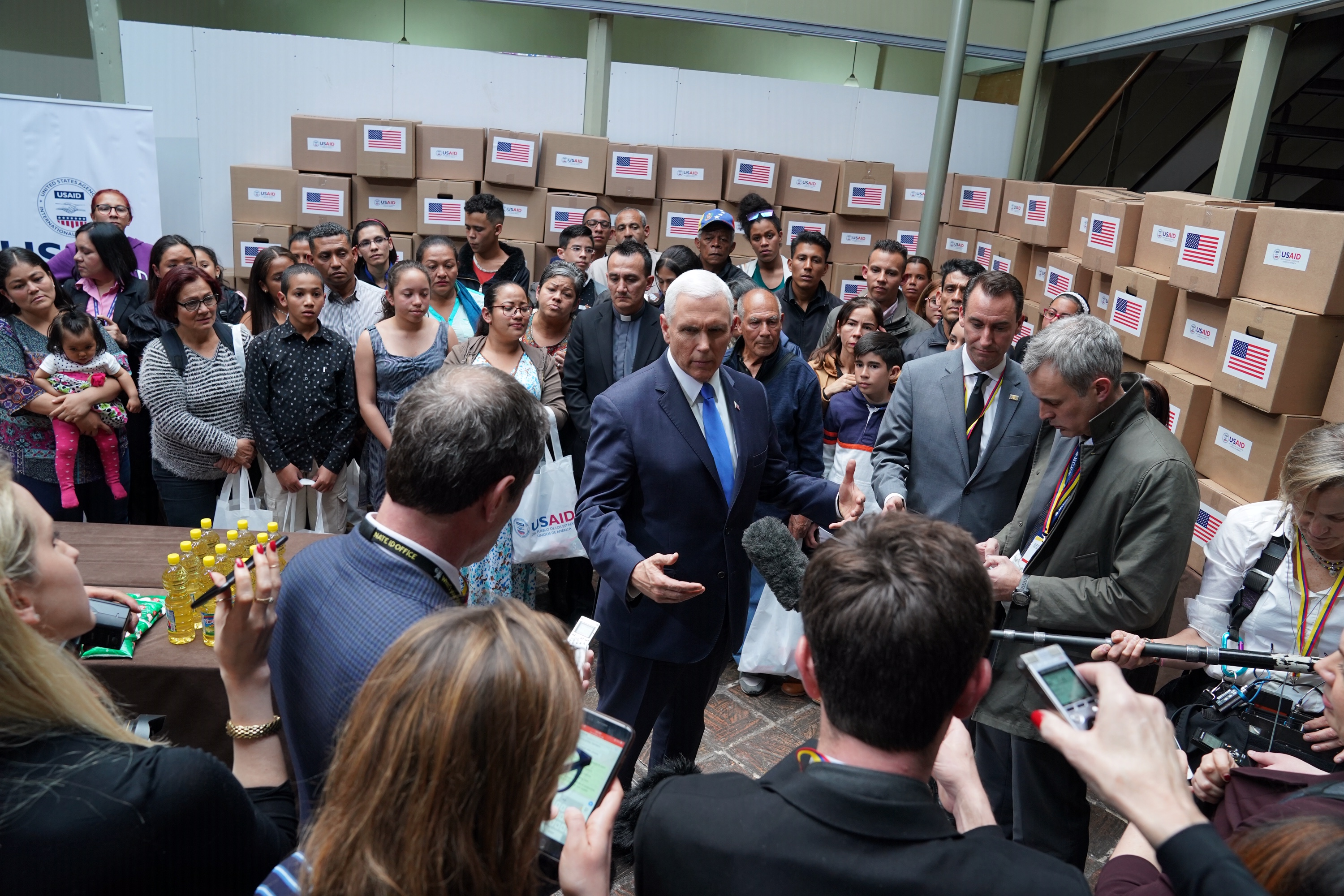
US Vice President Mike Pence speaks to reporters in front of US aid shipments and Venezuelan migrants in Bogota, Colombia on 25 February 2019

Thousands accompany a caravan of aid trucks towards the Colombia–Venezuela border. Guaidó headed a caravan of 300 people, briefly appearing on the lead truck as it left Cúcuta for Venezuelan territory. Maduro announces the severing of diplomatic relations with Colombia. Pro-Maduro paramilitaries fired upon demonstrators demanding aid in San Antonio del Táchira. According to opposition deputy Gaby Arellano, of the five trucks that attempted to enter Venezuela from Colombia, two were lost to fire, two were stolen by Maduro loyalists and one returned to Colombia. Both Colombia and Venezuela closed their joint border, leaving many Venezuelans trapped in Colombia and seeking shelter in makeshift camps.

On the Francisco de Paula de Santander Bridge, Venezuelan National Police wept while being confronted by Venezuelans begging for the entrance of international aid. Venezuelan National Police on the bridge then retreated further into Venezuelan territory as the aid caravan approached. As trucks crossed the bridge, Venezuelan authorities fired tear gas upon the protesters who responded with rocks and molotov cocktails and some trucks burst into flames. Aid volunteers formed a human chain and removed humanitarian packages from the burning trucks to prevent their destruction, with a good portion of the supplies being saved and returned to Colombia. Later in the day, protesters responded Venezuelan colectivos and military with molotov cocktails and stones.

On 23 February, trucks with humanitarian aid attempted to pass into Venezuela from Brazil and Colombia, opposed by Maduro's administration. At the Colombia–Venezuela border, the caravans were tear-gassed or shot at with rubber bullets by Venezuelan personnel as they crossed bridges. Protesters near the caravans responded by throwing stones and molotov cocktails at Venezuelan authorities in order to gain entrance into Venezuela later in the day. According to deputy Gaby Arellano, of the five trucks that attempted to enter Venezuela from Colombia, two were lost to a fire, two were stolen by Maduro loyalists and one returned to Colombia. The president of the Venezuelan National Assembly's Health Subcommission José Manuel Olivares was physically assaulted at the Colombian–Venezuelan border, reportedly by the member of a colectivo. Deputy Freddy Superlano was reportedly poisoned in Cúcuta, and his assistant died from the same incident. The opposition asked for an investigation, without making "claims on who the culprits were". A sister of a deceased National Guardsman denounced that her brother was killed by another officer when he asked for a discharge in the border.

==== Puerto Rican shipment ====
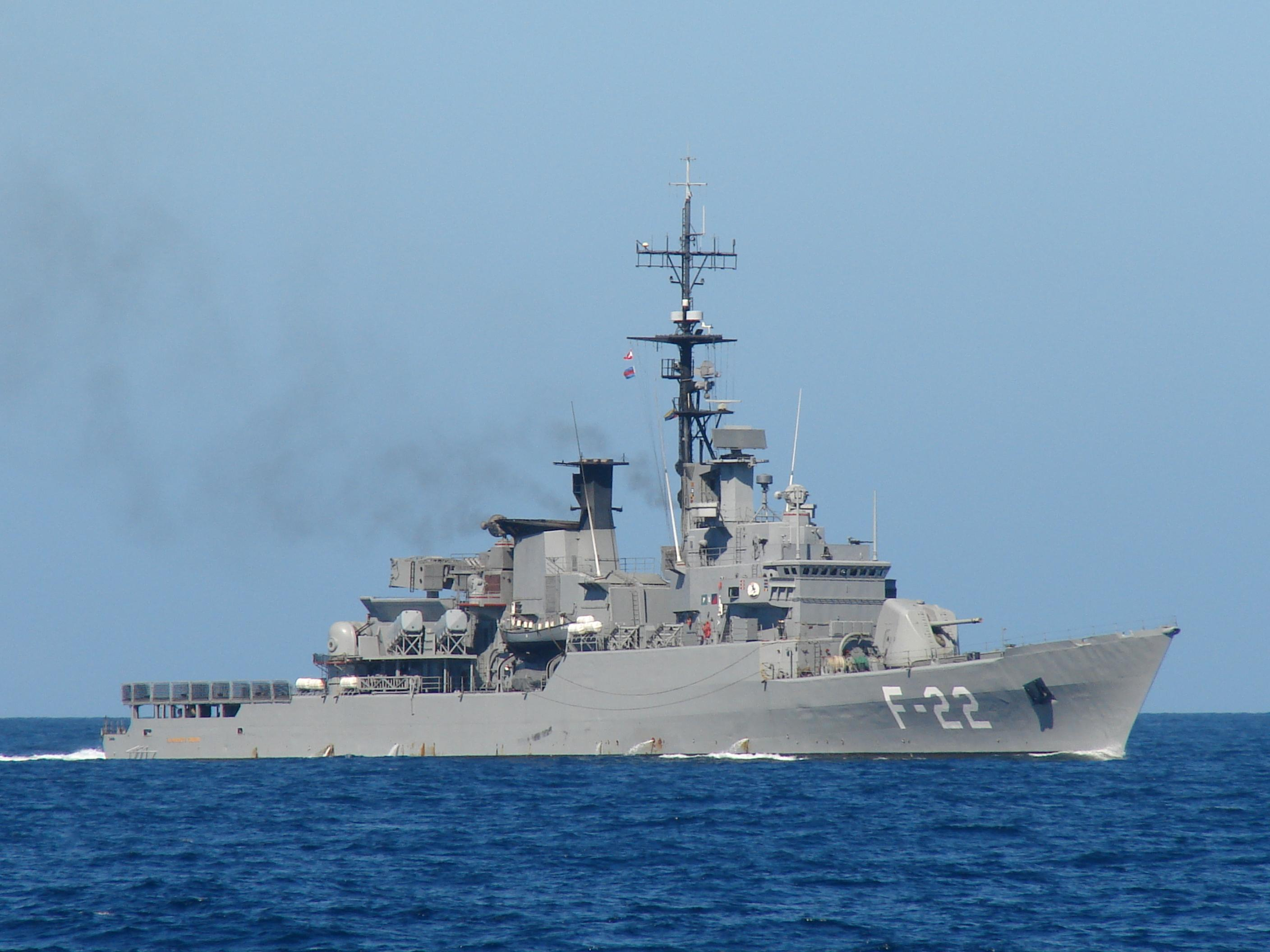
The Venezuelan Almirante Brión, a Mariscal Sucre-class frigate, deployed to prevent the 23 February entry of aid from Puerto Rico.

A ship originating from Puerto Rico attempted to deliver humanitarian aid via the port at Puerto Cabello, Venezuela, but the vessel, carrying civilians, returned after the Bolivarian Navy of Venezuela threatened to "open fire" on it. Six vessels of the Bolivarian Navy of Venezuela, including the Mariscal Sucre-class frigate Almirante Brion and patrol boats, were deployed to prevent the entry of the aid shipment. Governor of Puerto Rico Ricardo Rosselló, who ordered the return of the ship, stated that the act by the Venezuelan Navy was "unacceptable and shameful" and that Puerto Rico "notified our partners in the U.S. government about this serious incident".

==== Aftermath of 23 February ====
By the end of the day, a preliminary report by the Organization of American States (OAS) reported more than 285 injured, and former governor Andrés Velásquez reported as many as 14 deaths in the clashes. Reuters said that no aid destined for Venezuelan was able to enter the country. Maduro danced at a rally with his wife while the attempted entry of humanitarian aid was taking place, which CNN reported was attended by public employees whose jobs depend on Maduro.

Border clashes continued with Brazil and Brazilian patrols arrived at the border to prevent the violation of the territorial space by Venezuelan Armed Forces.

From 24 to 25 February, there were continued Colombian border clashes between protestors and colectivos; Venezuelan authorities fired upon protesters who threw rocks and molotov cocktails, and Colombian border police in Colombian territory near the Simón Bolívar International Bridge. Venezuelan National Guardsmen also fired live ammunition against protesters and Colombian policemen.

The Inter-American Commission on Human Rights (IACHR) asked the Venezuelan Armed Forces to abstain using force and to allow free transit.

Guaidó said the world "had 'been able to see with their own eyes' how Maduro had violated international law. 'The Geneva protocols clearly state that destroying humanitarian aid is a crime against humanity,' he said." Venezuelan Vice President Delcy Rodríguez declared that "they saw only a little piece of what we are willing to do", and Diosdado Cabello stated "we showed the tip of the iceberg".

=== Humanitarian aid fire cause ===
The cause of the fire that consumed humanitarian aid on 23 February is disputed. Eyewitnesses accounts attribute the source of the fire to tear gas canisters fired by the Venezuelan personnel. Unpublished footage examined by The New York Times published on 10 March suggested that the fire may have been accidentally started by a molotov cocktail thrown by an anti-government protester. Colombian foreign minister Carlos Holmes Trujillo rejected the claims by The New York Times that the Colombian government manipulated the video of the burning of the aid truck, insisting that Nicolás Maduro was responsible. Responding when asked about the claims in a BBC interview, Juan Guaidó stressed that its findings suggested only a possible theory, that it was the newspaper's point of view and that a total of three trucks were burned, while the footage focused on one. A group of around 30 Venezuelans protested outside The New York Times offices in the United States, questioning the newspaper's "partiality" and criticized the moment of the publication which occurred while Venezuela suffered from a nationwide blackout. Journalist Karla Salcedo Flores denounced state-run Telesur for plagiarism and the manipulation of her photos for propaganda purposes after the network claimed protesters poured gasoline on the trucks. Agence France-Presse published an investigation disproving Telesur's claims with the photos. Bellingcat reported that since the open source evidence examined for its investigation does not show the moment of ignition, it is not possible to make a definitive determination regarding the cause of the fire.

Deputy Miguel Pizarro informed that the National Assembly would denounce the burning of the trucks transporting aid in the International Criminal Court.

The United States and a number of other nations staged a walkout at the United Nations Conference on Disarmament when Venezuelan Foreign Minister Jorge Arreaza was preparing to begin his speech, boycotting him. Salcedo Flores denounced again the misuse of her photos by Arreaza and dismissed the claim that the photos represented any evidence of the alleged crimes committed by the protesters.

== Red Cross aid effort ==
Francesco Rocca, president of the International Federation of Red Cross and Red Crescent Societies, announced on 29 March 2019 that the Red Cross was preparing to bring humanitarian aid to the country to help ease both the chronic hunger and the medical crisis. The Guardian reported that Maduro had "long denied the existence of a humanitarian crisis, and on 23 February blocked an effort led by Guaidó to bring aid into the country", and that the Red Cross had "brokered a deal" between the Maduro and Guaidó administrations "indicating a seldom-seen middle ground between the two men".

The Red Cross aid shipments were expected to begin within a few weeks, and the first shipment would help about 650,000 people; simultaneously, a leaked UN report estimated that 7 million Venezuelans were likely in need of humanitarian assistance. During what The Wall Street Journal called "Latin America's worst humanitarian crisis ever", the "operation would rival Red Cross relief efforts in war-torn Syria, signaling the depth of Venezuela's crisis." Rocca said the efforts would focus first on hospitals, including state-run facilities, and said the Red Cross was open to the possibility of delivering aid products stored on the Venezuelan borders with Colombia and Brazil, if the products meet standards. The first shipments of medical supplies will bypass the government and go to eight clinics run by the Red Cross in Venezuela. Because of the additional problems caused by the 2019 Venezuelan blackouts, the Red Cross hopes to also provide hospitals with power plants. Rocca warned that the Red Cross would not accept any political interference, and said the effort must be "independent, neutral, impartial and unhindered".

The Wall Street Journal said that the acceptance of humanitarian shipments by Maduro was his first acknowledgement that Venezuela is "suffering from an economic collapse", adding that "until a few days ago, the government maintained there was no crisis and it didn't need outside help". Guaidó said the acceptance of humanitarian aid was the "result of our pressure and insistence", and called on Venezuelans to "stay vigilant to make sure incoming aid is not diverted for 'corrupt' purposes". Maduro and Arreaza met with representative of the International Committee of the Red Cross (ICRC) on 9 April, and Maduro, for the first time, indicated he prepared to accept international aid—although denying a humanitarian crisis exists. Red Cross was allowed access to prisons in Venezuela for the first time since before Chávez died, ranging from prisons holding largely foreigners to prisons holding largely political prisoners to military detention centers. Prisons minister Iris Varela said the delegates were invited so they could share the amazing quality of Venezuelan reform centers with the world. The ICRC announced a day later that there was an agreement to expand aid to 36 hospitals and primary health care centers.

Following the joint report from Human Rights Watch and Johns Hopkins in April 2019, increasing announcements from the United Nations about the scale of the humanitarian crisis, and the softening of Maduro's position on receiving aid, the ICRC tripled its budget for aid to Venezuela. The increased Red Cross aid would focus in four areas: the migration crisis, the health care system collapse, water and sanitation, and prisons and detention centers.

The first Red Cross delivery of supplies for hospitals arrived on 16 April via an air cargo shipment from Panama and contained generators, water, and surgery kits. Relative to the amount of need, the initial supplies were expected to be little "more than a palliative measure", but National Assembly Deputy Miguel Pizarro viewed it as an encouraging sign that the Maduro administration would allow more aid to enter. According to the Associated Press, having long denied that there was a humanitarian crisis in Venezuela, Maduro positioned the delivery "as a necessary measure to confront punishing U.S. economic sanctions"; having "rallied the international community", Guaidó "quickly claimed credit for the effort".

Quoting Tamara Taraciuk—an expert at Human Rights Watch on Venezuela—who called the situation "a completely man-made crisis", The New York Times said the aid effort in Venezuela presented challenges regarding how to deliver aid in an "unprecedented political, economic and humanitarian crisis" that was "caused largely by the policies of a government intent on staying in power, rather than war or natural disaster". The humanitarian crisis is impacted by the presidential crisis and international sanctions, along with concerns that the Red Cross effort alone will be insufficient to meet the need, and whether the aid effort will continue to be politicized. According to The New York Times, "armed pro-government paramilitaries" fired weapons to disrupt the first Red Cross delivery, and officials associated with Maduro's party told the Red Cross to leave.

In December 2019, Francesco Rocca, president of the International Federation of Red Cross and Red Crescent Societies (IFRC), denounced a lack of international assistance to Venezuela, stating that its international appeal for 50 million Swiss francs was less than 10 percent funded, which he attributed to a lack of political will and politicization of the aid process. Rocca warned that some actors wanted to use the desperation of the civilian population as a means to "destabilize the country", and disputed claims that the government was not allowing aid into the country, stating that the Red Cross was able to "deliver everything in a very free" way, but that there was a lack of aid to deliver.

== Other NGOs ==
Member of the National Assembly, Lester Toledo announced in May that the NGO Rescate Venezuela and the Ayuda y Libertad coalition had already given medical aid and survival kits to about 10,000 Venezuelans in more than 20 states. Most of the effort is carried out by volunteering.

== Irregularities ==
On 14 June, PanAm Post published an article reporting that representatives of Guaidó had misappropriated payments for the housing of Venezuelan military defectors that arrived at Colombia, allegedly using them for personal purchases. Following the publication of the article, Guaidó's presidential office informed that the individuals accused of corruption were dismissed from their positions and requested the cooperation of the Colombian government, multilateral agencies and other organizations to clarify the events an impartial investigation. The Venezuelan embassy in Colombia issued a statement informing that Guaidó and the appointed ambassador, Humberto Calderón, agreed to carry out an audit. Venezuelan political parties, including Popular Will, Justice First, Democratic Action and A New Era, supported the start of the investigation of the events. Colombian Foreign Minister, Carlos Holmes Trujillo, condemned the reported act of corruption and urged the authorities to advance the investigations to determine if any wrongdoings occurred.

The NGO Transparencia Internacional compiled a first report on the accused representatives. The report concluded that Guaidó's envoys were only involved in the administration of funds contributed by foundations and donors, not humanitarian aid from public funds. The NGO recommended appointing a special comptroller and independent agency to audit Venezuelan finances abroad.

== Reactions ==
=== Foreign aid ===
NPR reported that critics say the offer of humanitarian aid by the United States was designed as a way to place pressure on Maduro and to increase dissent among the Venezuelan armed forces, and that the US is using a similar tactic that Russia used in Ukraine, where 250 Russian trucks entered to deliver aid in 2014. Colombia, and Venezuela's neighboring countries, "are the most interested in seeing aid brought in", according to CNN, to "help reduce the wave of Venezuelan refugees pouring across their borders." Carlos Holmes Trujillo, Colombia's foreign minister, said that blocking aid was a crime that "would give even more reason ... to ask the International Criminal Court to investigate Maduro".

The United Nations (UN) stated in 2018 that "[v]ast numbers of Venezuelans are starving, deprived of essential medicines, and trying to survive in a situation that is spiraling downwards with no end in sight"; it recommended increased humanitarian funding for Venezuelans in 2019, and cautioned not to politicize aid. The UN said that "humanitarian action needs to be independent of political, military or other objectives", and calls for a de-escalation of tension from both sides.

The International Committee of the Red Cross "warned the United States about the risks of delivering humanitarian aid to Venezuela without the approval of security forces loyal to President Nicolas Maduro". It also said its ability to work in the current environment in Venezuela was limited" and that it could "not ... implement things that have a political tone". For the Red Cross, maintaining a neutral stance in political situations is most important; the organization holds that, for aid to be effective, both sides of the conflict should come to agreement. Having worked with local authorities inside Venezuela for a long time delivering relief, in February 2019 the organization had talks with the Venezuelan Ministry of Health about increasing its budget. Later in the month it doubled its Venezuela budget to €15.8 million (US$17.9 million).

On 16 April 2021, a report released by the Office of the Inspector General at the U.S. Agency for International Development concluded that the February deployment of aid responded in part to pressure Maduro rather than helping Venezuelans. The audit said USAID spent about US$2 million to purchase and transport 368 metric tons of commodities to the Colombia–Venezuela border and Curaçao between February and April 2019; by August 2019, 8 metric tons had been delivered to Venezuela, while the rest was distributed in Colombia or shipped to Somalia. The report also said that the U.S. aid to Venezuela did not fully comply with humanitarian principles.

=== Nations ===
The US pledged $20 million, and Canada pledged $53 million Canadian dollars in humanitarian aid, saying most of it would go to Venezuela's neighbors and trusted partners. Germany, Sweden, Argentina, Chile, Colombia, Puerto Rico, and the European Commission also pledged aid. At the Conference on Humanitarian Assistance in Support of Venezuela hosted by the OAS in Washington, D.C., John Bolton announced that 25 countries pledged US$100 million for humanitarian aid to be delivered to Venezuela via centers in Curaçao, Colombia and Brazil.

==== In support ====
- Argentina: The Argentine government highlighted the creation of a "help unit" to face the humanitarian crisis in Venezuela. This unit will serve as a bridge between donations from the country to the collection centers located on the border with Venezuela.
- Canada: The Canadian government announced that it will provide US$39 million of humanitarian aid in Venezuela during a meeting of the Lima Group in early February 2019.
- Chile: Undersecretary of Interior of the Chilean government, Rodrigo Ubilla, reported on the preparation of 17 tons of food and medicine to Venezuela and said the shipment would be sent directly to Venezuela once it is allowed to enter the country.
- Germany: The German government destined €5 million for humanitarian aid in Venezuela, to deliver it "as soon as the political circumstances permit".
- Italy: The Italian Minister of Foreign Affairs, Enzo Moavero Milanesi, agreed to send €2 million for humanitarian aid in Venezuela.
- Japan: Foreign Minister of Japan Tarō Kōno condemned the Maduro government for violently repressing the attempted entrance of aid and stated that Japan supports the shipment of international aid to Venezuelans in need.
- South Korea: The government of South Korea pledged US$3 million in aid to support the refugee and humanitarian crisis; US$1 million is earmarked for Venezuela for food and medicine, with the remaining US$2 million to go to Colombia, Ecuador and Peru for refugee support.
- Spain: The government of Spain, through the Office of Humanitarian Action of the Spanish Agency for International Development Cooperation (AECID), indicated that it would allocate €2 million in humanitarian aid for Venezuela by the year 2019.
- Sweden: The Swedish government destined 53 million Swedish krona (about US$7 million) for the humanitarian aid requested by Guaidó.
- Taiwan: The government of Taiwan destined $500,000 for the humanitarian aid to Venezuela and the chancellor Joseph Wu declared that "Venezuela needs democracy and an immediate economic stability".
- United Kingdom: The government of the United Kingdom indicated that it will initially allocate £6.5 million in emergency assistance packages that will supply children's nutrients, vaccines and clean water for the most vulnerable communities affected by the crisis in Venezuela.
- United States: The United States government, through its Agency for International Development (USAID) sent several shipments of food and medicine to Cúcuta, hoping it can enter Venezuela as soon as possible. In turn, Puerto Rico sent 2.5 tons of food and medicines to the collection center located in Cúcuta.

==== Against ====
- Bolivia: President Evo Morales described the humanitarian aid shipments as a "Trojan horse" and a pretext for military intervention.
- China: Spokesman for China's Foreign Ministry said that humanitarian aid should not be forced into Venezuela, which can cause violence and clashes. Following the clashes over humanitarian aid shipments, China said it hoped that the international community can provide "constructive" help to Venezuela under the precondition of respecting the country's sovereignty. In late March 2019, a Chinese plane delivered what "Venezuelan officials said was a 65-ton cargo of medical supplies".
- Cuba: The Cuban government called humanitarian aid "an attack on the sovereignty of the region".
- Russia: The Russian Foreign Ministry indicated that the humanitarian aid was only a "cover" for a US military intervention. On 1 March, Russian Foreign Minister Sergey Lavrov told Venezuelan Vice President Delcy Rodríguez that Russia will continue assist the Venezuelan authorities in resolving social and economic problems, including through the provision of "legitimate" humanitarian aid. It was also considering to send "mass supplies" of wheat to Venezuela, claiming those shipments will help normalize the humanitarian situation in the country.

=== Organizations ===
- United Nations: The Office of the United Nations High Commissioner for Human Rights (OHCHR) said that "many of Venezuelans are starving, deprived of essential medicines and trying to survive in a situation in free fall without an end in sight". Stéphane Dujarric, spokesman for UN Secretary General António Guterres, said it is "important that humanitarian aid be depoliticized and that the needs of the people guide in terms of when and how humanitarian aid is used."
- European Union: The High Representative of the Union for Foreign Affairs and Security Policy, Federica Mogherini, indicated that the European Union has already mobilized €60 million for Venezuela and will allocate an additional €5 million; Mogherini also affirmed that "humanitarian aid to Venezuela should not be politicized".
- The OAS approved a resolution on 27 March 2019 to "urge the public institutions of Venezuela, especially the military and police forces, to refrain from blocking the entry of humanitarian aid to Venezuela." Voting in favor were 19 countries; against 5 (Antigua and Barbuda, Nicaragua, Saint Vincent and the Grenadines, Uruguay and Venezuela); and 8 countries abstained (Barbados, Belize, Bolivia, El Salvador, Mexico, St. Kitts and Nevis, Suriname, Trinidad and Tobago). Dominica and Grenada were absent.
- The Venezuelan Red Cross affirmed that it will participate in the distribution of the aid while remaining outside the presidential crisis. Conversely, the Colombian Red Cross declared that it will not participate in the operation without prior agreement with the International Red Cross and Red Crescent Movement.

=== Defections ===
Guaidó encouraged military personnel and security officials to withdraw support from Maduro. During the attempt to bring humanitarian aid into Venezuela, hundreds of lower level troops fled across the border to seek refuge in Colombia. As of 5 April 2019, since the border clashes on 23 February began, 1,285 Venezuelan military personnel and police have broken ranks.

== See also ==
- Censorship and media control during the Venezuelan presidential crisis
- COVID-19 pandemic in Venezuela
- Humanitarian intervention
- Pemon conflict
- Venezuela–Colombia migrant crisis
