= Pemon conflict =

Conflict in Venezuela

- Part of the crisis in Venezuela
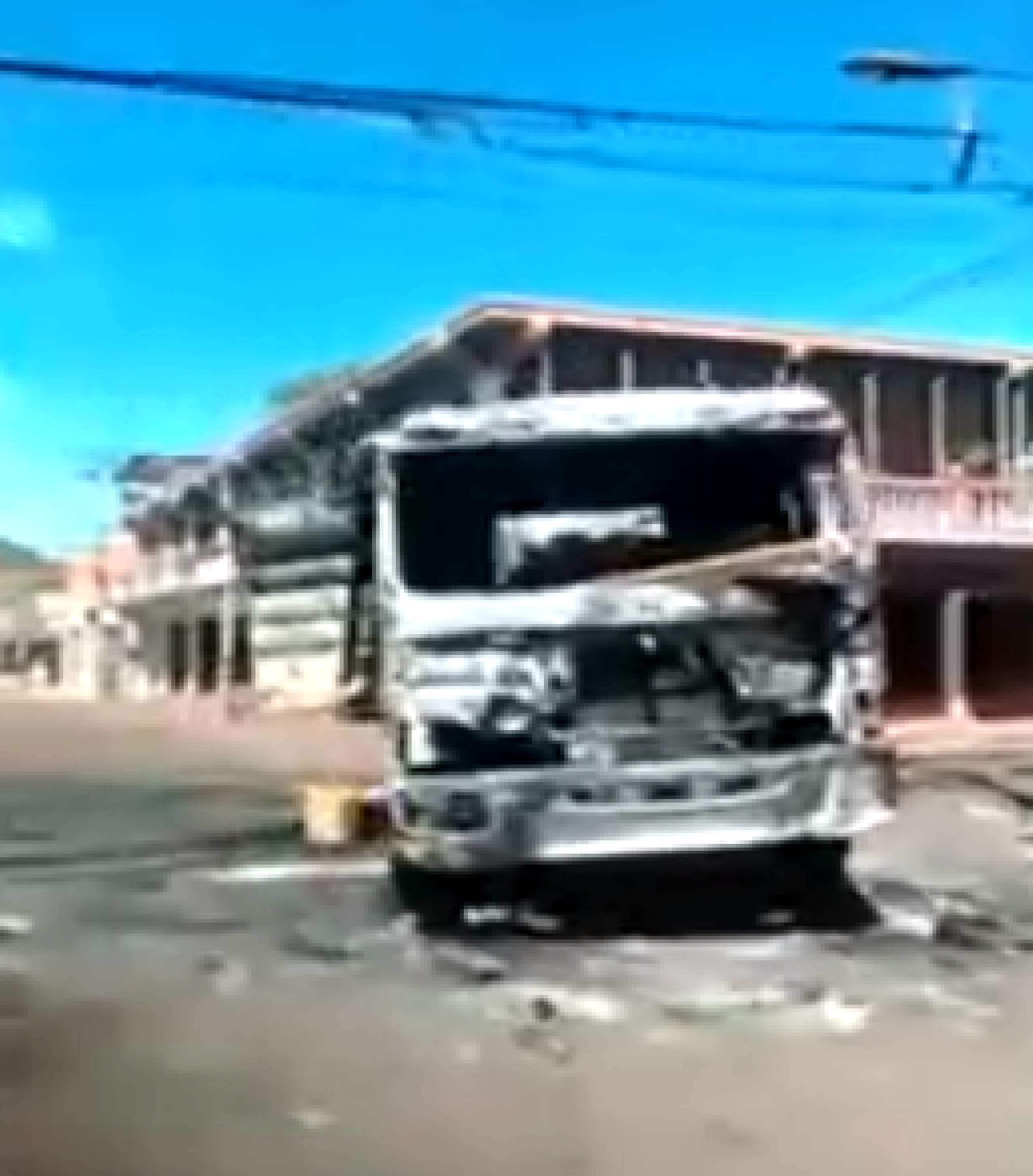
- Destruction in Santa Elena de Uairén after clashes
Date	24 February 2016 – present
Location	Bolívar and Amazonas, Venezuela
Status	Ongoing

Belligerents
Venezuela; (Venezuela) Bolivarian National Armed Forces; (Venezuela); Colectivos; ELN; Tupamaro; Venezuelan and Brazilian organized crime groups	(Venezuela) Pemon territorial guard; (Venezuela) Rebels of the 513 Infantry Battalion; (Venezuela) Armed Pemon and civil rebels; (Venezuela) Pemon and civil demonstrators

Commanders and leaders
Nicolás Maduro; Delcy Rodríguez; Cilia Flores; Diosdado Cabello; Jorge Rodríguez; Jorge Arreaza; Vladimir Padrino López	Indigenous leaders

Casualties and losses
1 soldier killed Several soldiers and colectivos wounded +50 soldiers captured	53 Pemons killed 1 rebel soldier killed 80 disappeared +100 civilians wounded 1 rebel soldier captured +57 arrested

The Pemon conflict is an ongoing conflict which is a part of the wider Crisis in Venezuela. The conflict is centered around mining disputes between the Chavista government, the Pemon nation (Indigenous people that live in the Gran Sabana region in southeastern Venezuela) and armed irregular groups. The Pemon nation is divided by the border between Venezuela and Brazil, resulting in Pemon refugees regularly crossing the border into Brazil for safety and medical care. The conflict is centred on disputes over mining in the Orinoco Mining Arc, a 112,000 km^{2} area of the Amazon Rainforest rich in gold, diamonds, coltan, and uranium, which are also home to the Pemon people.

On 24 February 2016 the "Arco Mining Orinoco National Strategic Development Zone" was officially created, a government sponsored mining project. Venezuelan scholars, the opposition National Assembly and the NGO PROVEA have publicly expressed their concern at the violation of rights of Indigenous communities and its environmental impact. In 2020, the United Nations High Commissioner for Human Rights, Michelle Bachelet, denounced that workers in the Orinoco Mining Arc had been subjected to serious abuse and violence. In March 2016, 28 miners were killed and kidnapped in the town of Tumeremo, Bolívar state, and between 14 and 16 October 2018, 16 miners at Los Candados mine were killed and 6 wounded in at least the third civilian massacre in Tumeremo since 2016.

During the 2019 shipping of humanitarian aid to Venezuela and after supplies were stockpiled on the Brazilian border, Venezuelan Dragoon 300 armoured fighting vehicles of the Armored Cavalry Squadron entered the Gran Sabana region. Indigenous Pemon blocked the entry of the military vehicles into the region and clashes between both groups followed suit. On 22 February, the day before the delivery was set, soldiers loyal to Maduro fired upon them, killing two and wounding fifteen, and the Pemon responded by capturing soldiers and setting fire to a military outpost of the Santa Elena de Uairén airport. The following day more than 2,000 Indigenous people from the region gathered at the border to assist with the entrance of the aid. The Venezuelan National Guard repressed demonstrations near Brazil, leaving at least four dead and about 20 injured. By the end of the conflict, National Assemblyman Romel Guzamana, a chieftain of the Pemon community in Gran Sabana, stated that at least 25 Pemon were killed. The National Assembly declared that 80 Pemons had disappeared since the massacre, in addition to the death toll claimed by Guzamana.

The vast wealth located in the Mining Arc makes Indigenous lands prime real estate for both state-sanctioned and illegal mining operations, at the cost of widespread ecological damage and displacement of Indigenous peoples living in conflict zones. A series of turf wars in the Gran Sabana between the armed forces, guerrillas, and organized crime groups, combined with the power struggle between Nicolás Maduro and Juan Guaidó, have created the ongoing conflict.

== Background ==
=== Pemon people ===
The Pemon are part of the larger Cariban language family, and include six groups including the Arekuna, Ingarikó, Kamarakoto, Tualipang, Mapoyo and Macushi/Makushi (Macuxi or Makuxi in Brazil). While ethnographic data on these groups are scant, Iris Myers produced one of the most detailed accounts of the Makushi in the 1940s, and her work is heavily relied upon for comparisons between historical and contemporary Makushi life. The Pemon were first encountered by westerners in the 18th century and converted by missionaries to Christianity. Their society is based on trade and considered egalitarian and decentralized, and in Venezuela, funding from petrodollars have helped fund community projects, and ecotourism opportunities are also being developed. In Venezuela, Pemon live in the Gran Sabana grassland plateau dotted with tabletop mountains where the Angel Falls, the world's highest waterfall, plunges from Auyantepui in Canaima National Park. In Brazil, Pemon live among other Indigenous people near the borders of Venezuela and Guyana in villages within the Terras Indígenas São Marcos and Raposa Serra do Sol. There are 792 Pemon according to a 2014 estimate.

=== Orinoco Mining Arc ===
On 24 February 2016 the "Arco Mining Orinoco National Strategic Development Zone" was officially created, an area rich in mineral resources that Venezuela has been operating since 2017; It has 7,000 tons of reserves of gold, copper, diamond, coltan, iron, bauxite, and other minerals. The Orinoco Mining Arc covers an area of 111 843,70 km^{2}, 12,2 % of the Venezuelan territory and doubling that of the Orinoco Belt.

The Academy of Physical, Mathematical and Natural Sciences, the Venezuelan Society of Ecology, the Association of Archaeologists and Archaeologists of Venezuela (AAAV), the National Assembly of Venezuela and the NGO PROVEA have publicly expressed their concern at the non-compliance with environmental and sociocultural impact studies, the violation of rights to prior consultation with Indigenous communities, cultural and natural heritage, and national sovereignty.

In 2020, the United Nations High Commissioner for Human Rights, Michelle Bachelet, denounced that workers in the Orinoco Mining Arc have been subjected to serious abuse and violence that have caused at least 149 deaths since 2016.

=== Tumeremo massacres ===
In March 2016, 28 miners were killed and kidnapped in the town of Tumeremo, Bolívar state. On the night of 4 March 2016, they were in the Atenas mine, on the border between the municipalities of Sifontes and Roscio, a poor area where, like most of the southeast of the country, the main economic activity is mining. According to anonymous witnesses, the Banda del Topo ("Mole gang") arrived at the mine, allegedly with the aid and complicity of unidentified security forces, and may have dispersed hundreds of miners with an ambush, with dozens falling and dying in the stampede. The bodies were allegedly put in a truck and moved across the border into territory administered by Guyana. Some said that parts of the victims were dismembered to intimidate the survivors.

The Prosecutor General, Luisa Ortega Díaz, said that the remains of at least four of the disappeared miners were later found in the middle of the country and seemed to have been shot, but that they had no identification. Ortega Díaz reported late on the night of 14 March 2016 that the search efforts for the disappeared miners had concluded with the discovery of 17 bodies in total. Tarek William Saab, the Ombudsman, subsequently announced on 15 March 2016 that the remains of 17 miners found in a mass grave in Tumeremo were wounded by firearms.

The National Assembly created a Special Commission to investigate the events.

Between 14 and 16 October 2018, 16 miners at Los Candados mine were killed and 6 wounded in at least the third civilian massacre in Tumeremo since 2016.

An opposition deputy for the state, Américo de Grazia, confirmed that the recovered bodies were of four men and three women. He also posted a thread of tweets showing several bodies, including those with gunshot wounds showing how they had been killed and abandoned. As high as eighteen people were murdered, and six people were reported injured. Five survivors of the attack returned to their village to report the events.

The National Liberation Army (ELN) was suspected of committing the massacre. Shortly after the events, towards the end of October, armed violence broke out in Tumeremo, which de Grazia says began with the presence of government military forces.

=== Violence and mining activity ===
In its 2018 report, the Venezuelan Violence Observatory (OVV) classifies the Bolívar state as the third state with the highest homicide rate, out of 23 states and after Aragua and Miranda. One of the two factors that the OVV attributed the homicide rate was the mining activity of the municipalities that had the highest rates in the country: El Callao, Roscio (Guasipati) and Sifontes (Tumeremo). The OVV explains that in this zone different forms of violence and crime concentrate, including the zones control by organized crime and kingpins, the violent response of military forces in the zone and recent presence of different guerilla groups. Besides the criminal activity of the armed irregular groups, there is also activity by security forces such as the Special Action Forces (FAES), with actions and operations that violate human rights, demonstrated by the lack of rule of law in the territory. Lastly, the "privatization of violence", since the functions of the state are "being assumed in an arbitrary and private way by whichever of the armed groups that operate in the area. According to Monitor de Víctimas (Victims' Monitor), as of 2018, 107 were killed in twelve massacres in Bolívar since 2016.

The Commission for Human Rights and Citizenship (Codehciu), an NGO located in the south of the country, documented that at least 26 people were reported missing in Bolívar's mining areas.

== Pemon conflict ==
=== 2018 ===
According to the San Antonio de Roscio Indigenous community captain, Ana Mercedes Figueroa, the tribe has had to organize since 2015 to resist against the threats of mining groups and "syndicates" directed by pranes (gang leaders) that not only try to control several mines, but also expel them from their territory, where gold exploitation makes harder the survival of the tribe. Since early 2018, the community started to protest against harsh life conditions, the murder of leaders allegedly committed by the Colombian National Liberation Army and the permanent harassment by organized crime groups that seek to control large territories where there is illegal mining and reportedly have direct relationships with state officials.

On 8 October 2018, members of the Pemon Indigenous community blocked, in the kilometer 67, the access to the road to Santa Elena de Uairén and to Brazil, the only road that connects Puerto Ordaz with the Venezuelan-Brazilian border, to protest against high food costs, lack of medicines to deal with diseases such as malaria, and the harassment of local gangs, as well as high transport prices, lack of fuel and domestic gas and speculation of the medical supplies prices. After eight days of protest, Santa Elena de Uairén still lacked food, fuel and gas that was demanded by the demonstrators that closed the access. Opposition deputy Américo de Gracia declared that the Indigenous people were victims of the indifference of the authorities.

After President Nicolás Maduro assured in a press conference on 12 December 2018 that there were armed groups that infiltrated in some Indigenous communities in the area bordering with Brazil, that the illegal mining in the south of the country is in the hands of "ecocidal mafias", blaming the political opposition for the violence in the zone, and denounced that the "indigenous people" who join them "destroy their community", Pemon people responded by publishing a video statement from Pemon chieftain Ricardo Delgado on social media:

El delito comenzó cuando no presentó su partida de nacimiento al postularse a la presidencia. El delito se cometió cuando se nombraron de manera irrita a los magistrados del Tribunal Supremo de Justicia. Cuando se convocó a una constituyente ilegal, irrita y fraudulenta, cuando se nombró al Fiscal General de la República ilegalmente[…]

— Ricardo Delgado, Pemon Cacique
Translation:

The crime started when you did not present your birth certificate when running for president. The crime was committed when the Supreme Tribunal of Justice justices were appointed in a null manner. When an illegal, null and fraudulent constituent was summoned, when the Attorney General of the Republic was appointed illegally[…]

Delgado also declared that candidate Andrés Velásquez won the 2017 regional elections in the Bolívar state, but that the executive branch imposed their candidate Justo Noguera, which the qualified as a crime. The video concluded with Delgado saying "go away Nicolás, because you are Colombian".

On 8 December, Directorate General of Military Counterintelligence (DGCIM) officials arrived on the morning to the Campo Carrao sector, in the Canaima National Park. According to the locals, their purpose was to carry out a raid, but they ended up in the mines of the zone, something frequent also according to the locals, where they injured two Pemons of the Arekuna community. Another person was shot and killed by DGCIM officials, who were wearing plainclothes at the moment. Journalist Germán Dam denounced that the perpetrators moved in helicopters used by Corpoelec, the state owned electricity corporation. As a response to the attack, the Indigenous community detained, desarmed and beat up the two perpetrators of the raid, while they also closed the runway near the town.

=== 2019 ===
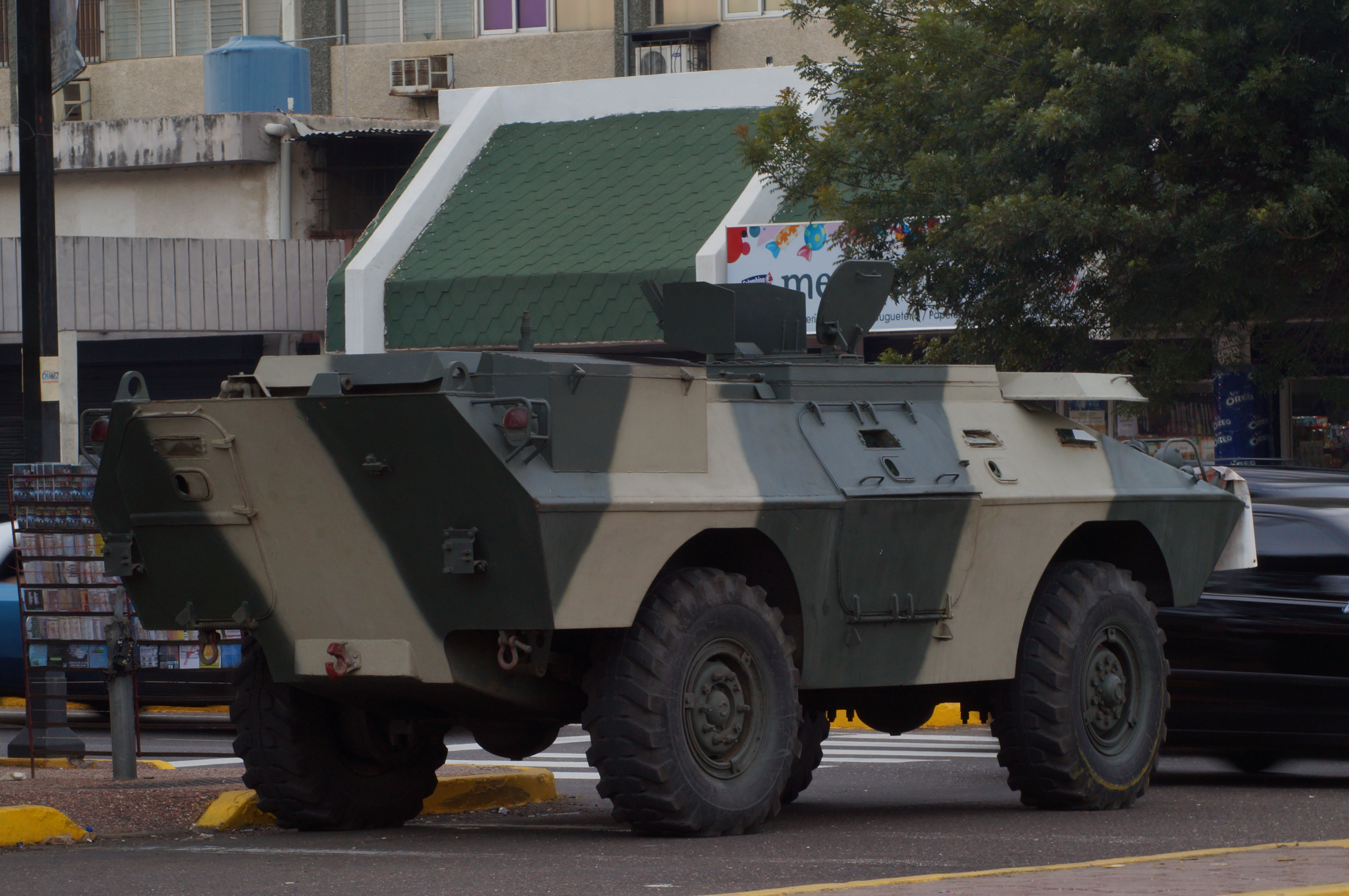
Venezuelan Dragoon 300s were deployed in Gran Sabana, near Pemon areas

Humanitarian aid was stockpiled on the Brazilian border, with the intent to bring it into Venezuela. On 20 February, Dragoon 300 armoured fighting vehicles of the Armored Cavalry Squadron were seen entering the Gran Sabana region. Groups of Indigenous Pemon people blocked the entry of the military vehicles into the region.

On 22 February, members of armed forces loyal to Maduro fired upon the inhabitants of Kumarakapay with live ammunition, killing two and wounding fifteen. Deputy Américo de Grazia, denounced the lack of medicine and ambulances to transport the wounded. The injured were transferred to Brazil due to the shortage of medical supplies in the Venezuelan hospital of Santa Elena de Uairén. According to them, eighty of their neighbors had to flee to Brazil to escape persecutation, a 5% of inhabitants in a population of 1 500. Following the crackdown, Indigenous groups captured thirty-six soldiers, held them in the jungle and set fire to a military outpost of the Santa Elena de Uairén airport.

On 23 February, near the Brazil–Venezuela border, more than 2,000 Indigenous people from Gran Sabana gathered to assist with the entrance of international aid. Venezuelan authorities issued a capture order of the mayor of Gran Sabana and of the Pemon chieftains, accusing them of rebellion. The Venezuelan National Guard repressed demonstrations near Brazil, while colectivos attacked protesters in San Antonio del Táchira and Ureña, leaving at least four dead and about 20 injured. A Venezuelan army post near Santa Elena de Uairén was attacked with molotov cocktails and stones. Aid trucks destined to travel from Brazil into Venezuela did not enter Venezuela and returned to their departure points. The Brazilian Army reported that Venezuelan authorities fired live ammunition at those attempting to accept aid and that tear gas from Venezuela was fired into the Brazilian border city of Pacaraima.

Former governor Andrés Velásquez declared that fourteen people were killed and that many of them had gunshots wounds in their heads, indicating involvement of snipers. He further explained that "many have died due to lack of attention because the Santa Elena hospital did not have blood, saline solution, reactives nor oxygen, or operating rooms to intervene the patients", that the people died bleeding and the hospital personnel could not do anything to help them. Two ambulances carrying dead and wounded crossed the Brazil–Venezuela border and took them to the Roraima General Hospital, in Boa Vista, where medic records documented that everyone had gunshots wounds. US senator Marco Rubio declared that Cuban agents directed repression in Ureña.

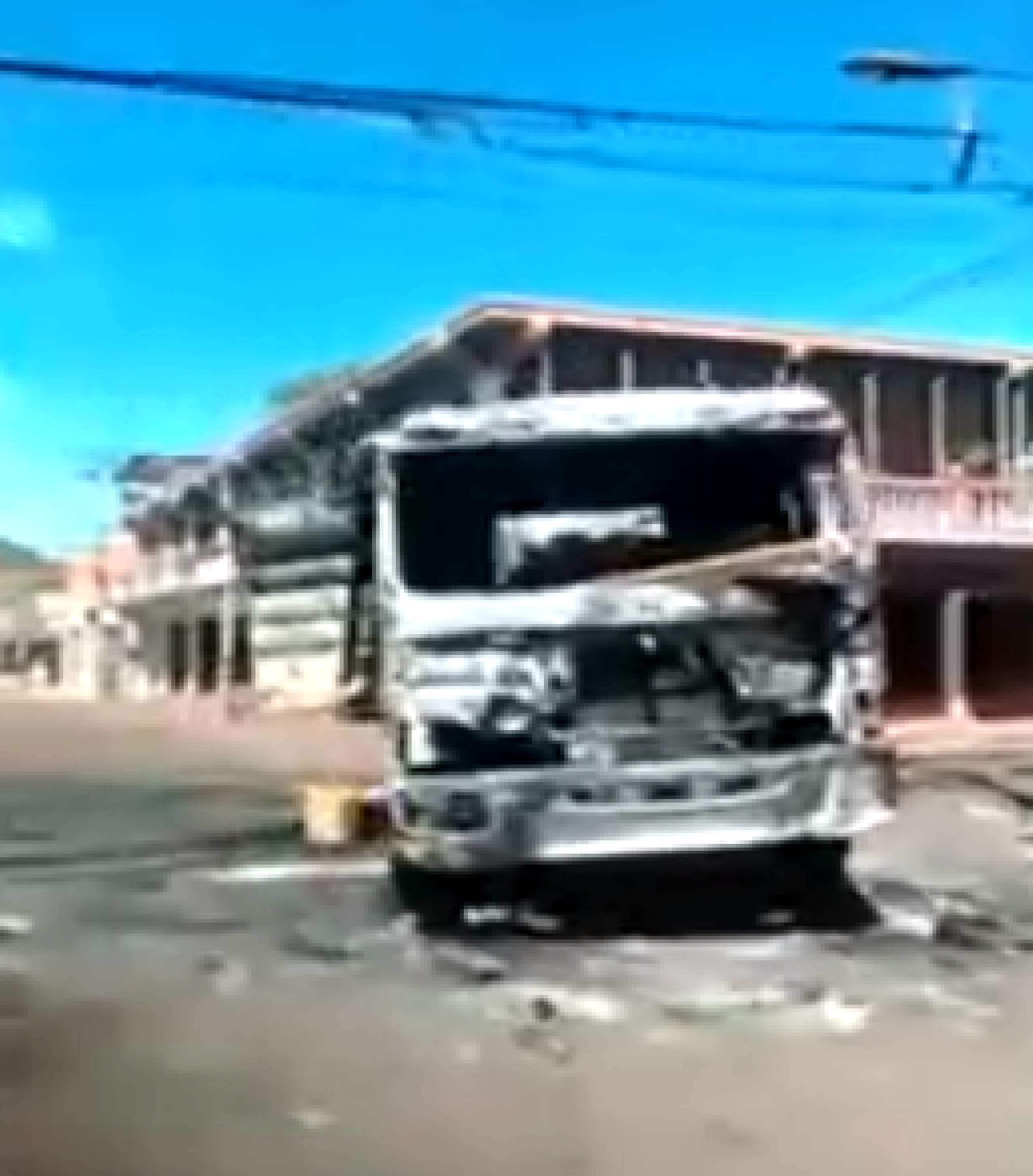
Destruction in Santa Elena de Uairén after clashes between inhabitants and security forces on 23 February 2019

The next day, on 24 February, colectivos arrived in Gran Sabana Municipality looking to arrest the mayor, who had recognized Juan Guaidó as interim president. They did not find him, but as the only Indigenous mayor in Venezuela, he was stripped of his post, which was assigned to someone loyal to the Maduro regime. Then on February 27, the National Guard successfully recaptured the airport and arrested four Indigenous leaders of the uprising. By the end of the conflict, National Assemblyman Romel Guzamana, a chieftain of the Pemon community in Gran Sabana, stated that at least 25 Pemon were killed in what has been described as a "massacre" by Venezuelan troops. The National Assembly added that 80 Pemons had disappeared since the massacre, in addition to the death toll claimed by Guzamana.

On 22 November, at least nine people were killed in a mine in Ikabarú, in Bolívar, including a teenager, a Pemon and a National Guardsman. On 10 December, a group of around forty Russian soldiers arrived to Canaima, Bolívar, on a Shaanxi Y-8 plane landing on the runway that serves as the entry to the National Park. Locals assured that the soldiers wore uniforms of the Venezuelan Armed Forces and that they carried crates with microwave equipment, satellite antennas, signal inhibitors, and other devices.

In the dawn of 22 December, a group of around twelve regular soldiers and 30 Indigenous reservists, led by an Army deserter officer, captured the facilities of the 513 Mariano Montilla Jungle Infantry Battalion, located in the Luepa sector, in the Gran Sabana municipality. According to police information, after the assault to the battalion, the police received a call at around 4:58 am VST from officer Franco Efrain to notify that heavily armed individuals, feigning to be Directorate General of Military Counterintelligence officials, aimed at every active official, stripped them of their ordinance weapons (five pistols) and took a bulletproof vest.

Journalist Román Camacho reported that according to police sources, ammunition and 112 rifles were obtained during the raid. The rebel military and Pemons later attacked a police station in San Francisco de Yuruaní, where they seized nine 9 mm pistols and five shotguns. While they were escaping, they found a military checkpoint, where a shootout started, and they ran to the trails. Government forces pursued and engaged again, when former National Guardsman Darwin Malaguera Ruiz was injured and detained. A soldier was killed during the shootout, and the government forces recovered 82 AK-103 rifles, 60 grenades and six 7.76 ammunition boxes.

=== 2021 ===
Salvador Franco, a Pemon arrested in December 2019 accused of having participated in the 22 December barracks assault in Bolívar, died on 3 January 2021 due to lack of medical attention. The Indigenous people national coordinator of the NGO Foro Penal declared that Franco had COVID-19 and that for months suffered from gastrointestinal diseases related to the insalubrity of his penitentiary center, informing that he lost a lot of weight in his last months of life. There was a court order for his transfer to a health center since 21 November 2020, but ultimately it was ignored.

The Organization of American States Secretary General, Luis Almagro, condemned Franco's death, naming it as "another crime of the dictatorship" and gave his condolences to his relatives and friends.

In February 2021, the remaining twelve Pemon detained and accused of participating in the attack of the military outpost located in Bolívar were released.

=== 2022 ===
On March 20, 2022, a group of Yanomami approached security forces saying that the area's Wi-Fi password, which was meant to be shared between Indigenous tribes and soldiers in a local military base, had been changed without the notification of the Yanomami. The dispute grew deadly as security forces fired at the group, killing four Yanomami and wounding six more. Yanomami responded by holding two soldiers hostage, both of whom were eventually released.

== See also ==
- 2016 Tumeremo massacre
- October 2018 Tumeremo massacre
- 2019 shipping of humanitarian aid to Venezuela
- Orinoco Mining Arc
