= 2016 Tumeremo massacre =

Massacre of miners

Tumeremo massacre
- Location: Tumeremo, Bolivar State, Venezuela
- Date: March 8, 2016
- Target: Tumeremo miners
- Deaths: 4 (confirmed); 24 disappeared, supposedly murdered

The Tumeremo massacre occurred on 8 March 2016, in which 28 miners were murdered and kidnapped in the town of Tumeremo, located in the state of Bolívar, Venezuela. On the night of 4 March 2016, they were in the Atenas mine, on the border between the municipalities of Sifontes and Roscio, a poor area where, like most of the southeast of the country, the main economic activity is mining.

== Attack ==
Bolívar state in Venezuela.

According to anonymous witnesses, the Banda del Topo ("Mole gang") arrived at the mine, allegedly with the aid and complicity of unidentified security forces, and may have dispersed hundreds of miners with the ambush, with dozens falling and dying in the stampede. The bodies were allegedly put in a truck and moved across the Guyanese border. Some say that parts of the victims were dismembered to intimidate the survivors. However, the commission formed by the National Armed Forces and the CICPC assured that there was no evidence of any massacre or confrontation, and the governor of Bolívar state, Francisco Rangel Gómez, assured that "there is not a single thing to show that they have died or been massacred." The Venezuelan Ombudsman commissioned local investigations, and the Public Ministry authorised three prosecutors for the incident.

== Victims ==
The remains of at least four of the disappeared miners were later found in the middle of the country, and seemed to have been shot, Venezuelan Prosecutor General Luisa Ortega Díaz said, but they had no identification.

Ortega Díaz reported late on the night of 14 March 2016 that the search efforts for the disappeared miners had concluded with the discovery of 17 bodies total.

Subsequently, the Ombudsman, Tarek William Saab, announced on 15 March 2016 that the remains of 17 miners found in a mass grave in Tumeremo were wounded by firearms. He met with local and military authorities that began investigating the massacre and also indicated that officials of the Bolivarian National Armed Forces and security forces of Bolívar state were continuing to search a sector of the Hoja de Lata mine.

== Responses ==
President Nicolás Maduro said that investigations into the disappearance of the 28 miners in the town of Tumeremo would be undertaken to the fullest extent and those responsible for the crime will be punished, blaming a paramilitary group for the attack.

Lester Toledo, a Voluntad Popular leader, criticised Rangel, explaining that "[i]t is a national shame, because it is a humanitarian issue: 28 people disappeared and Governor Francisco Rangel Gómez didn't travel to Tumeremo to face the relatives." Toledo was one of many opposition politicians who asked for the governor's resignation due to the mismanagement of the case of the disappeared miners.

== See also ==
- El Topo (criminal)
- Enforced disappearances in Venezuela
- Kumarakapay massacre
- October 2018 Tumeremo massacre
- Pemon conflict
