= 2015 migrant crisis =

2015 migrant crisis may refer to:

- 2015 European migrant crisis, involving people from Africa and the Middle East migrating into Europe
- 2015 Rohingya refugee crisis, involving Rohingya people migrating from Myanmar and Bangladesh to other countries in Southeast Asia
- Venezuela–Colombia migrant crisis, involving Colombian migrants being deported by Venezuela
