= 2018 Tumeremo massacre =

Massacre of Venezuelan Miners by far-left Colombian guerrillas

- Location: Tumeremo, Bolívar, Venezuela
- Date: 14—16 October 2018
- Target: miners
- Deaths: 7
- Injuries: 6

The 2018 Tumeremo massacre is at least the third civilian massacre of miners in the Venezuelan town of Tumeremo since 2016. Occurring over three days from 14 October 2018, it is suspected that a Colombian guerrilla group is responsible for the murders.

== Attack ==
The miners attacked were at Los Candados mine. The opposition politician for the state, Américo de Grazia, claimed that the recovered bodies were of 4 men and 3 women. He also posted a thread of tweets showing several bodies, including those with gunshot wounds showing how they had been killed and abandoned. Five survivors of the attack returned to their village to report the events, there are reportedly six people injured.

== Suspected attackers ==
According to The Guardian, victims' families blame the Colombian guerrilla group, the National Liberation Army (ELN), and that this group is supported by Venezuelan Chavista Government. These kinds of attacks were previously described as a type of gang warfare between mining mafias, but the leftist ELN and Maduro are allegedly attempting to disrupt production and gather mining profits, according to analytical reports.

== Responses ==
Local businesses and schools were closed for the investigation, which lasted many weeks. The attack furthered opposition displeasure at the government's supposed complicity with organized crime and harboring Colombian terrorists. It drew international media attention to the violence in remote parts of the country. It is viewed as the worst of many massacres in the region since the 2016 massacre. Shortly after the events, towards the end of October, armed violence broke out in Tumeremo, which de Grazia says began with the presence of government military forces. On 31 October, US President Donald Trump signed an executive order introducing sanctions on the illegal gold trade of Venezuela. The Los Canados mine was an illegal operation.

== See also ==
- 2016 Tumeremo massacre
- Kumarakapay massacre
- Pemon conflict
