= El Topo (criminal) =

Ecuadorian gang leader (1972–2016)

- Born: Jamilton Andrés Ulloa Suárez; August 16, 1972; Santo Domingo, Ecuador
- Died: May 6, 2016; El Limon mine, El Callao Municipality, Bolivar State, Venezuela
- Citizenship: Ecuador (birthplace) and Venezuela
- Occupation: Leader of illegal gold trade cartel
- Organization: Banda El Topo
- Known for: Perpetrating the 2016 Tumeremo massacre

Jamilton Andrés Ulloa Suárez was an Ecuadorian criminal and gang leader better known as El Topo who illegally controlled the mining, distribution, and marketing of gold from Bolivar State in Venezuela through his gang Banda El Topo. He is also known for perpetrating the massacre of twenty-eight miners in Tumeremo, Venezuela in 2016.

== Biography ==
El Topo was born on August 16, 1972, in Santo Domingo, Ecuador as Jamilton Andrés Ulloa Suárez. He first entered Venezuela in 2002 through San Antonio del Táchira and registered as a foreign citizen with resident status in 2004. Prior to moving to Venezuela, El Topo lived in Colombia and received paramilitary training at a young age. He first worked as a miner in Bolivar State, and over time rose through the ranks of illegal gold cartels. He became second-in-command of the illegal gold trade in Bolivar, and grew to manage thirty gold mines in Bolivar and Guyana after the death of his brother in 2009. El Topo was known for his brutal tactics of dismembering opponents and feeding the body parts to animals.

On March 4, 2016, residents of Tumeremo reported the disappearance of twenty-eight miners from the town. El Topo became the prime suspect for the disappearance, and the bodies of the miners were discovered in a mass grave with many having been shot in the head. The massacre was reportedly the result of a conflict between El Topo's gang Banda El Topo and another gang led by El Gordo. Following the massacre, El Topo became the most wanted criminal in Venezuela. SEBIN, the Venezuelan intelligence service, killed El Topo on May 6 at the El Limon mine in El Callao Municipality, Bolivar.
