= PanAm Post =

Libertarian news website

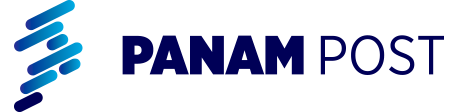
- Logo of PanAm Post since 2020.

- Screenshot of PanAm Post's Spanish-language homepage from October 27, 2022.
- Website type: News, opinion
- Available in: English, Spanish
- Headquarters: Miami, {{{location_country}}}
- Founder: Luis Henrique Ball Zuloaga
- Editor: José Gregorio Martínez
- Industry: Online newspaper
- Website: www.panampost.com
- Registration: None
- Launched: July 1, 2013; 13 years ago
- Current status: Active

The PanAm Post is a conservative libertarian and anti-socialist news and opinion website launched in 2013 by Luis Henrique Ball Zuloaga. It publishes Spanish and English news, investigations, and opinion from a free market perspective and "in the tradition of pan-Americanism." The outlet is based in Miami, Florida.

== History ==
The site was founded in 2013 by Luis Henrique Ball Zuloaga. Ball stated that PanAm Post began as a project to counter the reporting of news outlets in Latin America that he believed had been "taken over by socialist ideas." While the platform was originally launched to offer news and analysis on Latin America for English-speaking audiences, by 2019 its content was primarily published in Spanish.

Following its launch, former editor-in-chief Fergus Hodgson wrote that the PanAm Post was a new generation of journalists dedicated to bilingual coverage of social movements. Hodgson criticized what he called the "bloated and inefficient organizational structures" of legacy media and cited local U.S. journalist Ben Swann as a source of inspiration.

== Demographics ==
The majority of visitors to the PanAm Post are from the United States, followed by Venezuela, Guatemala, Argentina, and Colombia, in that order. Most visitors are college educated and visit the website at home.

== Reception ==
Communication studies researchers at the University of Valencia regarded the PanAm Post in 2022 as pseudo-media alongside publications such as Breitbart News and Okdiario. Pseudo-media, they noted, describes publications that imitate the reporting styles of traditional media "while infringing the most basic journalistic conventions, such as the conflation of data and commentary, with an overt ideological bias."

== Controversies ==
=== FARC defamation lawsuit ===
On August 20, 2019, PanAm Post editor-in-chief Vanessa Vallejo published an article titled "Los violadores que son 'honorables' congresistas en Colombia" (The rapists who are 'honorable' congressmen in Colombia) accompanied by a photo of FARC senator Carlos Lozada. Lozada, who held one of the ten congressional seats reserved for the FARC since 2018 under the Colombian peace agreement, filed a defamation lawsuit against Vallejo and the PanAm Post in a Bogotá court. A judge initially ruled against the PanAm Post but that ruling was overturned on appeal.

=== Coverage of Venezuelan opposition ===
In mid-2019, PanAm Post editor-in-chief Orlando Avendaño published investigative articles that alleged the involvement of Venezuelan politicians in corruption. On June 15, Avendaño authored an investigative report that claimed that the disputed acting president of Venezuela, Juan Guaidó, had improperly used humanitarian aid funds to maintain military officials who deserted to Cúcuta during the 2019 Venezuelan presidential crisis. Then on August 23, Avendaño published an article that asserted that opposition politician Henry Ramos Allup had participated in a corruption scheme involving the state oil company PDVSA. Ramos's Democratic Action party responded by categorically denying the claims and accusing the PanAm Post of defamation. In a letter, party officials alleged that Ramos was the target of a defamation campaign as a result of his "strong and unwavering support" for Juan Guaidó.

The PanAm Post staff published an editorial defending the veracity of their reporting and decision to criticize certain opposition politicians. The editorial also acknowledged their ideological affinity for the views of Diego Arria, Antonio Ledezma, and María Corina Machado, calling them "representatives of a true opposition".
