= Guasipati =

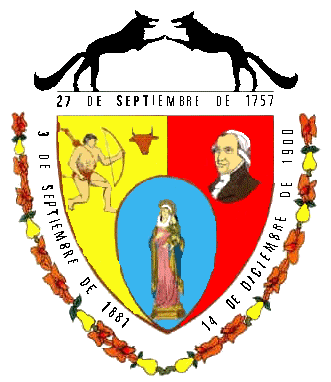
- Coat of arms

- Location within Venezuela
- Coordinates: 7°28′0″N 61°28′0″W
- Country: Venezuela
- States: Bolívar
- Founded: 27 September 1757

Area
  - Total: 6,182 km^{2} (2,387 sq mi)
- Elevation: 350 m (1,150 ft)

Population (2011)
  - Total: 21,165
  - Density: 3.424/km^{2} (8.867/sq mi)
- Time zone: UTC−4 (VET)

Guasipati is a town that serves as the administrative seat of Roscio Municipality in the state of Bolívar, Venezuela. It was founded on 27 September 1757. Its economy depends highly on the gold of its land and that of El Callao.The city is located in the vicinity of the Denguesito ríachuelos to the northwest and the Cunurí to the west, both tributaries of the Miamo river. According to data from the National Institute of Statistics (census 2011) the population of Guasipati is 21,165 inhabitants.

== History ==
Guasipati the eleven of the Missions of the Caroni and El Dorado, was founded in 1757. In the local Caribbean dialect, guasipati means "beautiful land". Guasipati did not become a prosperous or productive member of the mission system because its soils were not so fertile and the other missions had to share their meat and cassava with it. When in 1853 they discovered "the richest gold mines in the world" 18 km south of El Callao, Guasipati revived. It was decreed capital of the newly formed Yuruari Territory, and during the 30 years that followed the discovery of the gold veins of El Callao, the area of waterlogged gold prospectors that came to Guasipati to request the granting of solid rock concessions.

Currently, Guasipati continues to be the political and administrative heart of a good part of Venezuela's gold and diamond producing area. Agricultural and logging, mining and cheerful center, via El Palmar, taste of good Guyanese cheese, fruits of the tropics and good people.

== Geography ==
The municipality of Roscio is located in the northeast of the state of Bolivar and has a total of 6,182 km^{2}. The capital of the municipality is Guasipati and El Miamo is the second most important population in the municipality of Roscio.

=== Parishes ===
There are 2 parishes in the municipality, which are the following:

- Salom Parish with the population capital of Miamo and is located to the west of the municipality.
- Parish and capital section Roscio whose capital is also that of the municipality that is the population of Guasipati, is located east of the municipality.

=== Hydrography ===
In the municipality of Roscio there are 3 important rivers that are Guarichapo, Macorumo and Miamo, among other important rivers of the Bolivarian municipality of Roscio.

=== Weather ===
In the municipality, the temperature varies between 25º and 50 °C, depending on its location and the different landscapes in the more than 6,000 km^{2} that make up the municipality. Little rain in the region, with a semi-desert climate

== Tourism ==
In the municipality there are tourist attractions such as the resorts on the rivers near the Guasipati and the Miamo River, in addition to some natural monuments, Plaza Bolivar de Guasipati, its old mines, and some mountains and small forests are excellent places for recreation. You can visit famous places like the cemetery of Yeguera, the path of the shepherdess, the Church of Nuestra Señora del Rosario and some ruins of the indigenous missions.

== See also ==
- List of cities and towns in Venezuela
