= Ingarikó =

Ingarikó (Ingaricó) or Kapon is a term that collectively refers to three closely related tribes of indigenous people of South America, living in areas of Venezuela, Brazil and Guyana. Linguistically, the three groups fall within the Cariban language family. These groups are:

- The Akawaio people
- The Pemon people
- The Patamona people

== See also ==
- Annetta Kapon, artist
- Tomer Kapon (born 1985), Israeli film and television actor
- Capon
