= 2015 Colombia–Venezuela migrant crisis =

Humanitarian crisis in South America

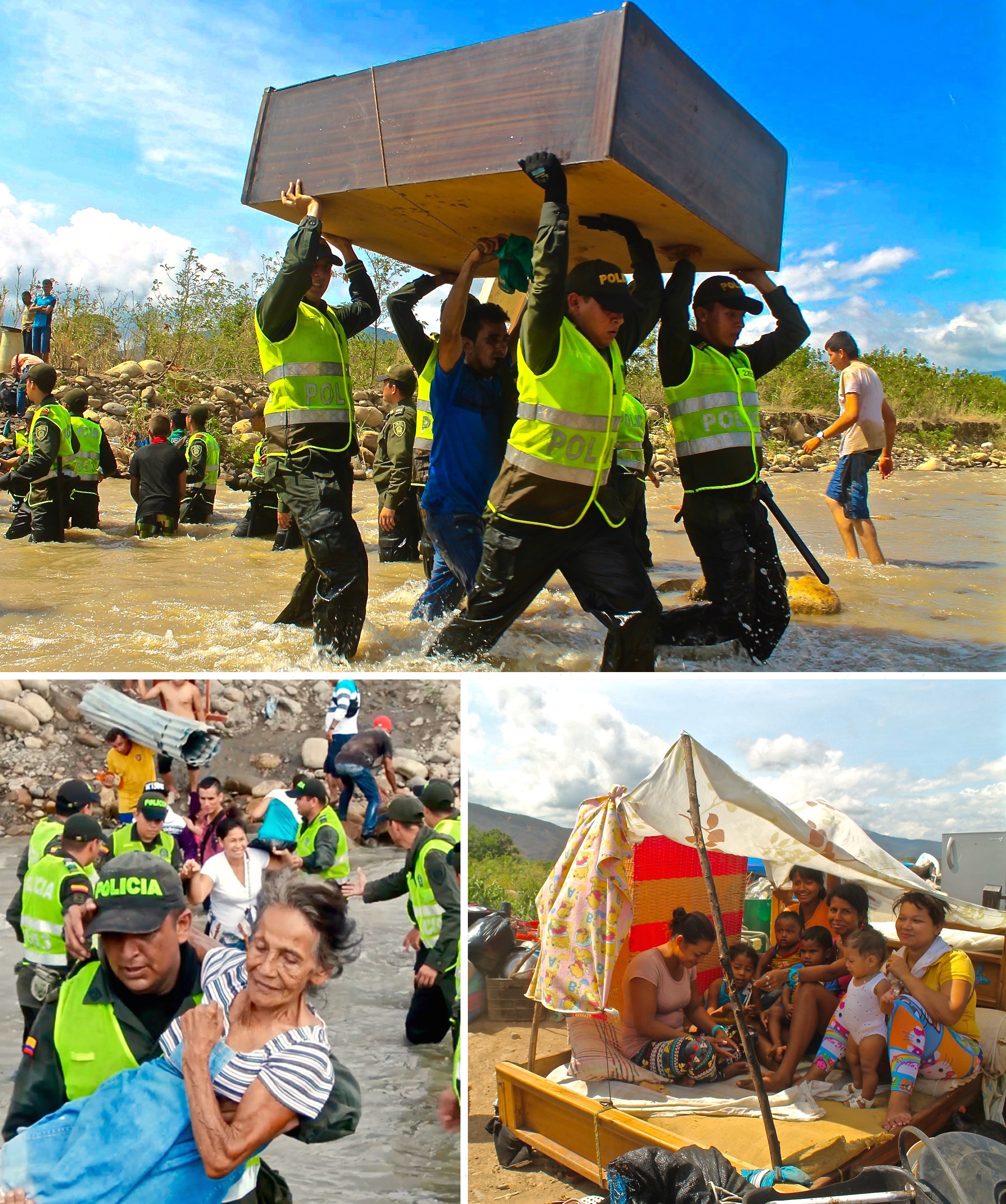
- Images from top, left and right: Colombian National Police assisting refugees with their belongings. An elderly Colombian refugee being carried by a Colombian National Police officer. Colombian refugees in a makeshift shelter seeking shade.
- Date: 19 August 2015 – 12 August 2016
- Location: Venezuela Colombia
- Outcome: +22,000 Colombians displaced

The 2015 Colombia–Venezuela migrant crisis refers to a diplomatic and humanitarian crisis that occurred in mid-2015 following the shooting of three Venezuelan soldiers on the Venezuela–Colombia border that left them injured and President of Venezuela Nicolás Maduro's response of deporting thousands of Colombians. Maduro's response of declaring a state of emergency, closing the border to Colombia indefinitely and deporting thousands of Colombians that lived near the border, struck fear in tens of thousands of other Colombians living in Venezuela resulting in their emigration from the country and a crisis involving separated families and Colombians seeking food and shelter. The actions of President Maduro were questioned by human rights groups, the United Nations, the European Union and the United States.

Conflicts eventually lessened months after tensions initially flared in August 2015. By July 2016, the Venezuelan government allowed Venezuelans to traverse into Colombia once again, with hundreds of thousands of Venezuelans taking advantage of the opportunity in order to retrieve food due to shortages in Venezuela. On 12 August 2016, the Venezuelan government officially reopened its border with Colombia.

== Background ==
Since the 1970s, Colombians had fled to Venezuela to avoid violent conflict in their homeland. In the 1990s, Colombians amounted to 77% of all immigrants in Venezuela, according to Raquel Alvarez, a sociologist at the Andes University in Venezuela. Going into the 2000s, Venezuelan president Hugo Chávez used record high oil revenues to fund populist policies and social programs known as Bolivarian Missions in Venezuela. With such programs, the Chávez administration then granted Colombians residency, the right to vote and other social services; even offering bus rides for Colombian-Venezuelans across the border who wanted to vote for Chávez. Colombians who received such benefits would often in turn support Chávez in elections. The creation of currency controls and subsidies under Chávez also allowed a business of smuggling to occur across borders. On the border of Colombia and Venezuela, Colombians would often take advantage of the Bolivarian government's subsidies and smuggle price fixed goods from Venezuela to Colombia in order to receive profits.

Municipalities in the border affected by crisis.

Going into the 2010s, economic actions performed by Chávez's government over the previous decade such as overspending and price controls proved to be unsustainable, with the economy then beginning to falter, while inflation, poverty and shortages in Venezuela increasing. By then, Colombians who had emigrated to Venezuela became disappointed with Venezuela due to the economic collapse of its economy and increasing discrimination by the Venezuelan government and its supporters. Tens of thousands to possibly 200,000 Colombians had left Venezuela in the few years preceding 2015. According to the Ministry of Foreign Affairs, passports to Colombia increased 150% between March 2014 and March 2015. Repatriation assistance of Colombian-Venezuelans had also reached a record number in the first quarter of 2015 and in early 2015, Martin Gottwald, the deputy head of the United Nations' refugee agency in Colombia, warned that many of the Colombian refugees that had fled to Venezuela may move back to Colombia. The high influx of Colombians returning to Colombia worried the Colombian government since the return of Colombians would raise the unemployment rate and cause a strain on public services. In the 10 months preceding the crisis, 9,000 additional Colombians were forced to leave Venezuela according to the Association of Colombians in Venezuela.

Who comes from Colombia? People practically without education, without a penny in their pocket.

— Nicolás Maduro, President of Venezuela

In 2014 and 2015 under the Nicolás Maduro government, the socioeconomic situation of Venezuela grew more troubled as the country entered a recession, shortages worsened and the inflation rate rose to the highest point in Venezuelan history to over 100%. The Venezuelan government blamed shortages in Venezuela on smugglers stating that as much as 40% of the basic commodities it subsidized were being smuggled out of the country, though economists disagreed with such claims stating that only about 10% of subsidized products are smuggled out of the country. According to The Washington Post, "lawlessness and smuggling are rife along the Venezuelan-Colombian border — but the trouble has been caused not by Colombians but by the Maduro government's disastrous economic policies" and that "the flow is controlled not by poor migrants but by corrupt Venezuelan army officers".

On 19 August 2015, three Venezuelan soldiers were injured from gunfire on the border of Colombia and Venezuela. President Maduro immediately closed the border to Colombia in San Antonio del Táchira and Ureña. While President Maduro declared a state of emergency "to protect the people ... from criminals, from paramilitaries, from an economic war", others saw Maduro's actions as a distraction from the poor socioeconomic conditions of Venezuela and a way for him to blame Venezuela's problems on Colombia. President Maduro's confrontational actions were also compared to tactics used by his predecessor, Hugo Chávez, that were used as distractions from the problems facing his government, with accusations presented by the Venezuelan government rarely involving any substantial evidence.

== Effects ==
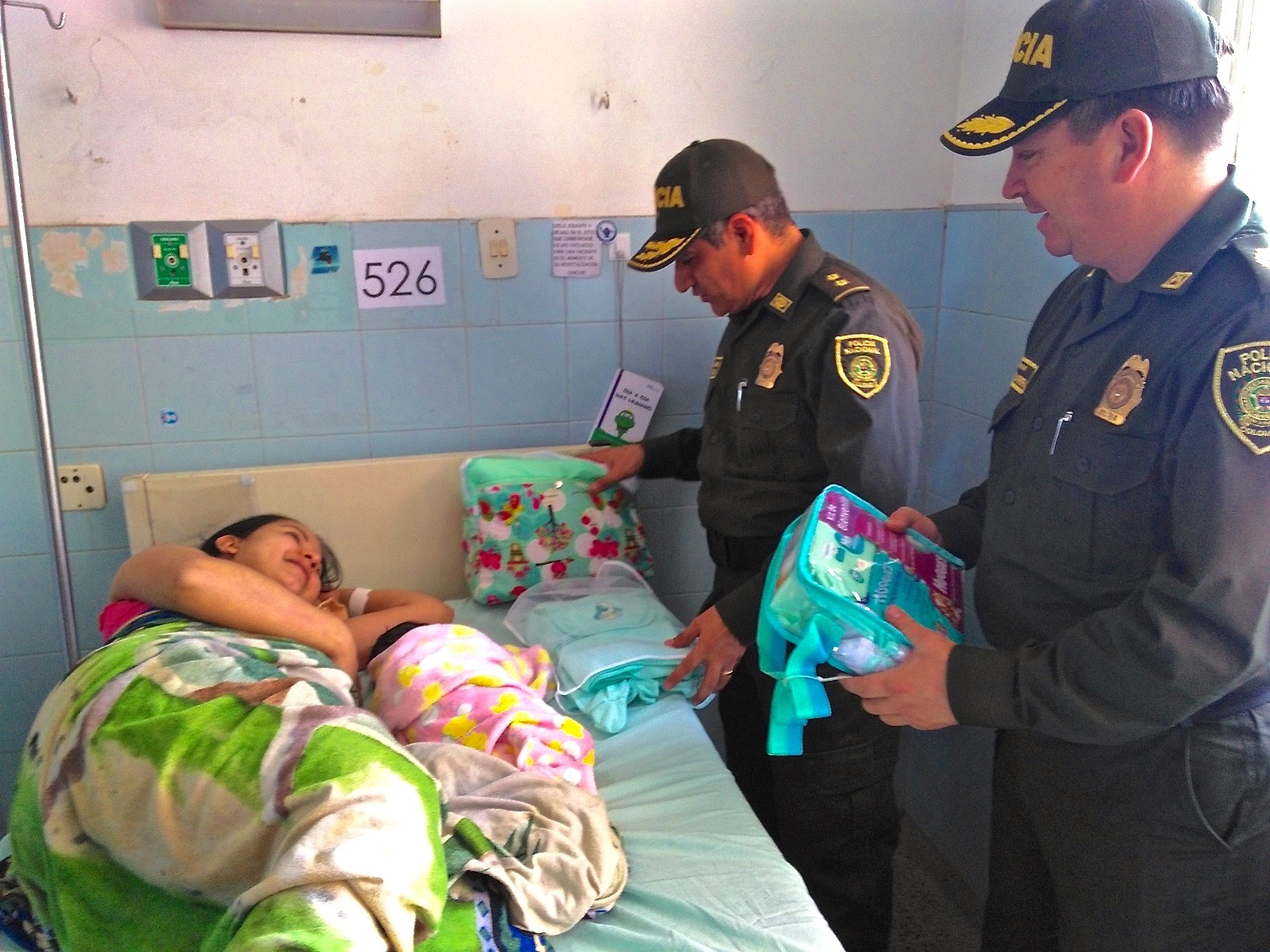
Colombian National Police officers providing items for a woman and her child.

On 20 August after the state of emergency was declared by President Maduro, Venezuelan authorities combed through designated areas on the border, checking the documents of residents. When Colombian families and many of their children who did not have their papers in order were discovered, they were forced from their shanty homes constructed of decrepit wood and sent to a football field, being held without food or water the entire day and were then deported later that night. Homes were marked with an "R" if the home was searched and "D" if the home was destined to be destroyed, though President Maduro also promised to demolish the entire neighborhood. Other Colombians were told after their houses were raided that they had 72 hours to evacuate their homes before they would be destroyed. Despite the declared state of emergency, the areas in Venezuela where the declaration was in effect saw little police activity and events such as fairs and parties occurred as usual.

On 28 August, Colombians could be seen crossing the Táchira River carrying their life possessions from Venezuela to Colombia. While authorities on the Colombian side assisted individuals fleeing Venezuela across the river under the sun, Venezuelan authorities could be seen on the Venezuelan side of the river, laying in the shade relaxing or on their cellphones. Later in the day, Venezuelan authorities had also prevented Colombians from crossing the river arbitrarily. Reports by some refugees also suggested that they had been mistreated by Venezuelan authorities, with Venezuelan authorities allegedly damaging homes and stealing possessions.

Flattening houses, using force against people, separating families, not allowing them to take their few possessions and marking the houses for demolition is totally unacceptable and is a reminder of bitter episodes of humanity that can not be repeated.

— Juan Manuel Santos, President of Colombia

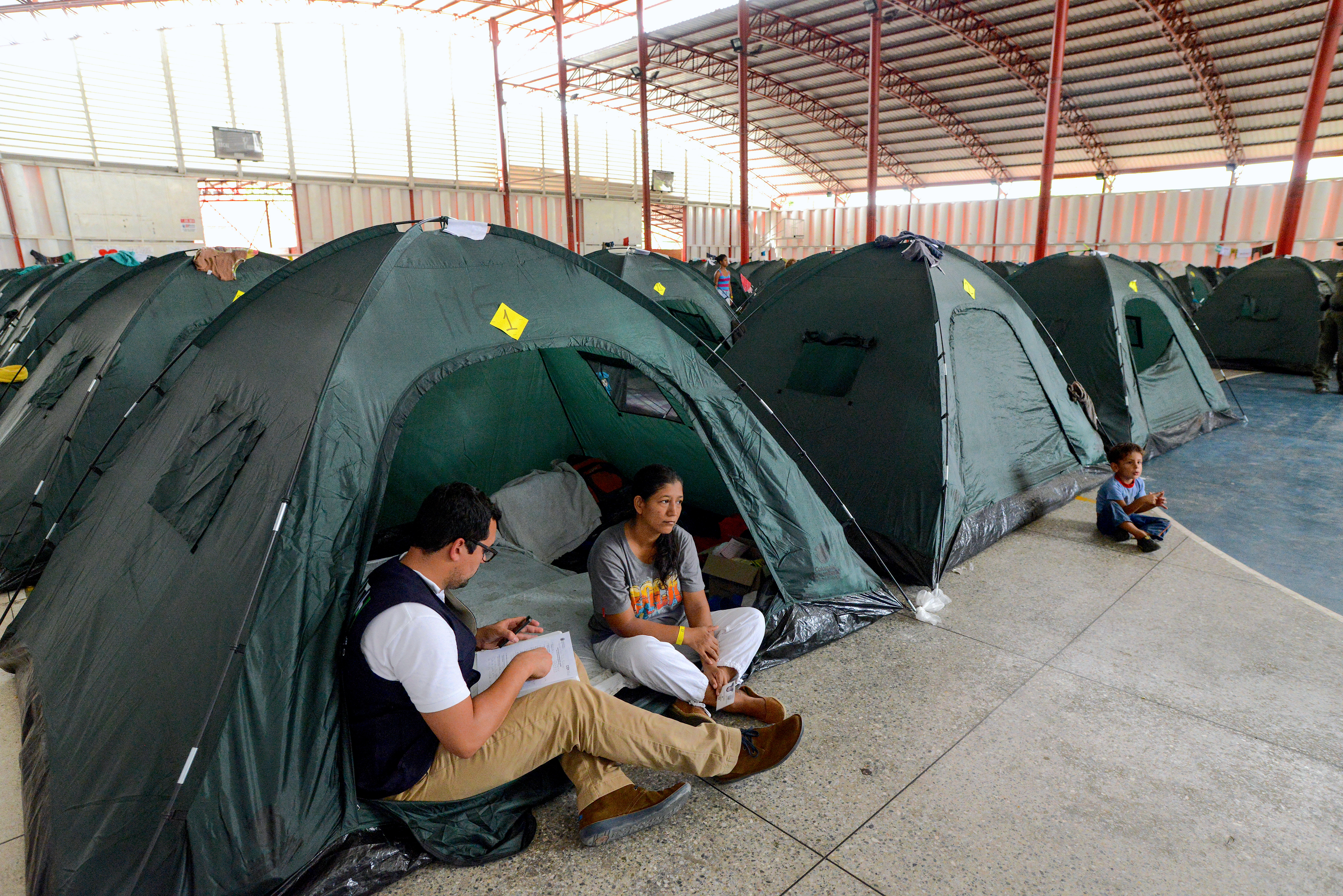
An Inter-American Commission on Human Rights worker questioning a woman at a refugee camp in Colombia.

Colombian president Juan Manuel Santos quickly responded to the incoming migrants with his government constructing tents and living quarters in various buildings while also providing food and medical assistance for the displaced Colombians. A subsidy of about $80 for displaced Colombians was announced with the Colombian government announcing that assistance of jobs for the deportees was in progress. President Santos also demanded that children be allowed to return to schools in Venezuela and for Colombians with belongings left in Venezuela to be able to receive what they own, stating that "Colombians need their fundamental rights respected". The Venezuelan government allowed the children to return to schools in Venezuela. The Colombian government also promised returning Colombians that citizenship would be granted for their Venezuelan family members, with Colombian foreign minister, María Ángela Holguín, stating that "we want families to live together, not to break them apart". Colombia also recalled its ambassador from Venezuela on 28 August with Venezuela recalling its ambassador from Colombia as well.

By 1 September, it was reported by the Colombian government that hundreds of children were separated from their families and that the Venezuelan government ignored requests to reunite hundreds of families that were torn apart during the crisis.

The Wayuu population numbering at about 600,000 people may also be affected by the closing of the border. Wayuu natives do not have passports and do not recognize the border between Colombia and Venezuela, with contraband brought from Venezuela not being seen as illegal by the Wayuu and tribal leaders warning of increasing social tensions from preventing trade.

On 12 September, Venezuela and Colombia send moving troops and armored vehicles along the border.

On 13 September, Colombia is demanding an explanation from Venezuela after spotting two military aircraft flying in Colombian airspace, the defense ministry said Sunday. The confrontation comes amid a larger diplomatic rupture between the countries as Venezuelan President Nicolas Maduro has closed major border crossings and deported of thousands of Colombian nationals.

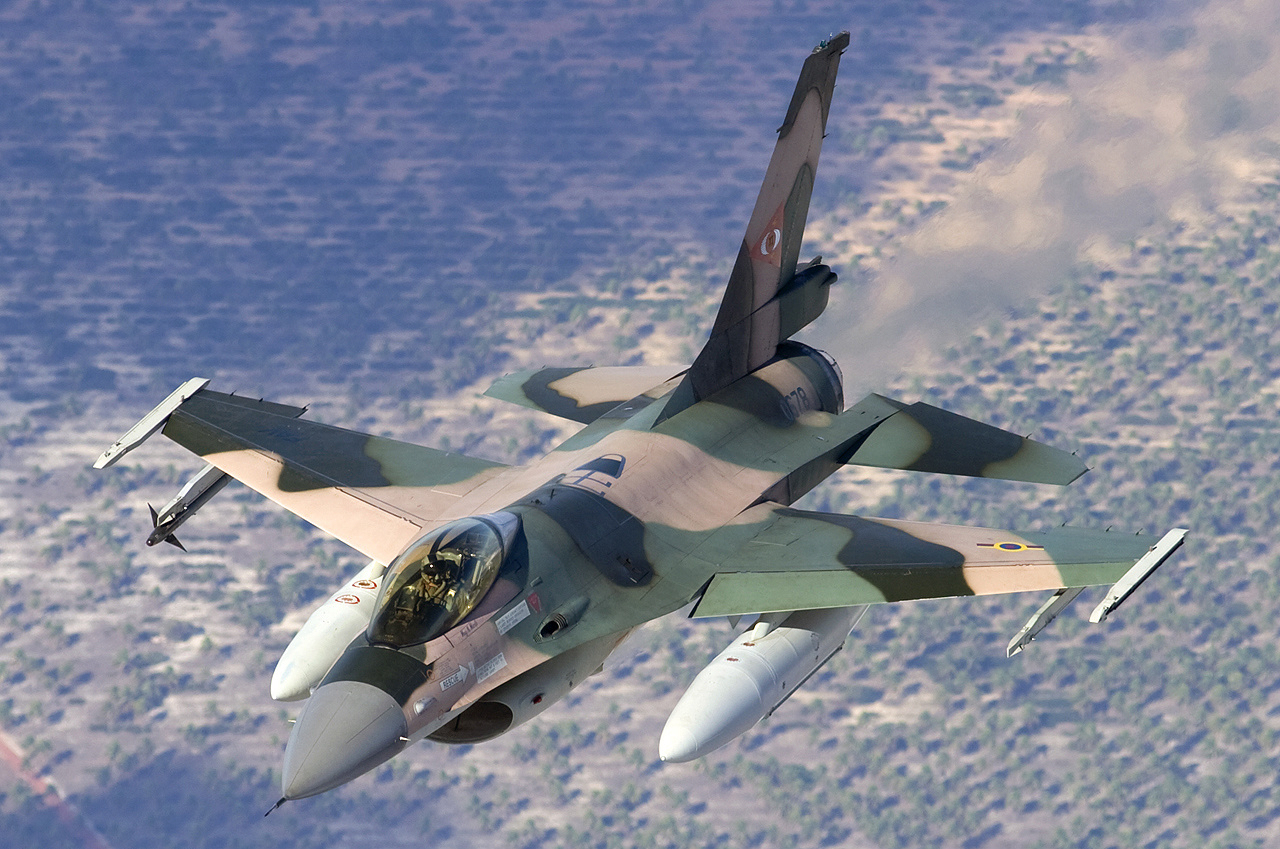
A General Dynamics F-16 Fighting Falcon had invaded Colombian airspace on September 14.

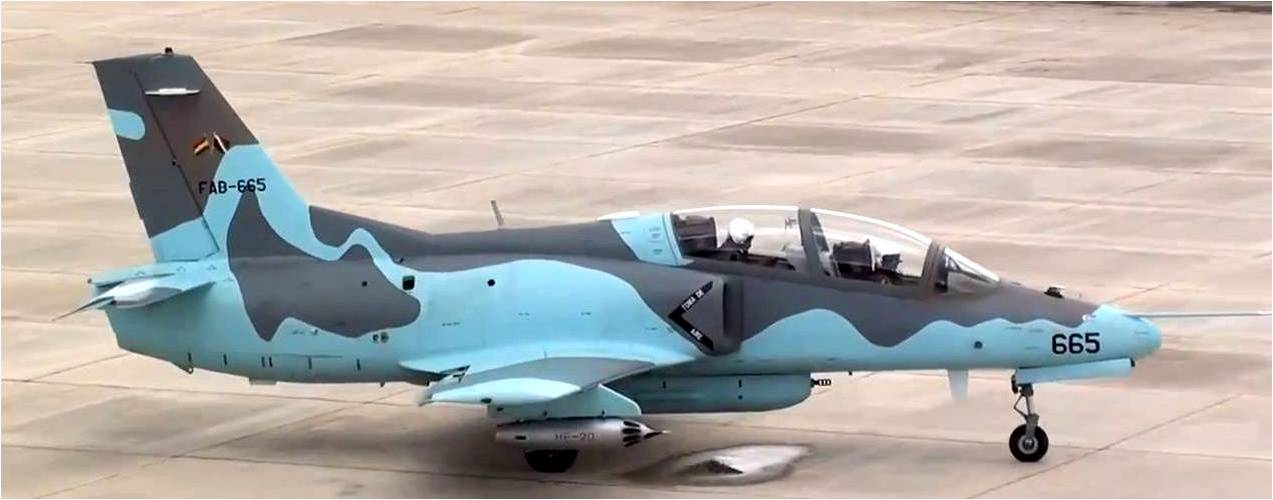
One Hongdu JL-8 systems, according to the Colombian Air Force, violated the airspace of the Republic of Colombia.

On 14 September, another Venezuelan military airplane flew into Colombian airspace without permission on Sunday, the head of Colombia's air force said, the second such incident over the weekend that threatens to further complicate relations between the two countries. The Venezuelan aircraft crossed the border at eastern Vichada province and flew about 10 km (six miles) inside Colombian territory, air force General Carlos Bueno told reporters on Monday. He said radar detected two planes, but only one crossed the border. Colombia's President Juan Manuel Santos has already ordered a formal protest and an explanation from Venezuela after two military airplanes were detected on Saturday in northern La Guajira province. Those aircraft entered Colombia, flew about 2.9 km (1.8 miles) over the border and then circled above a military unit.

On 15 September, the United Nations Office for the Coordination of Humanitarian Affairs reported that at least 23,738 had returned or were deported to Colombia from Venezuela.

On 17 September, a Venezuelan fighter jet with two people on board crashed near the Colombian border late on Thursday evening after an "illicit aircraft" believed to be Colombian was found violating airspace, according to the Venezuelan government. It was not immediately clear whether the two pilots on board the Sukhoi Su-30 aircraft had been killed. The cause of the crash has not been determined.

On 18 September, about 15 Venezuelan soldiers entered Maicao municipality in eastern La Guajira province in apparent pursuit of an individual on a motorcycle who had attempted to cross the border into Venezuela, the Colombian army said in a statement. After the individual on the motorcycle entered a home, the soldiers burnt the abandoned vehicle and returned to Venezuela, the army said. Community members said they were mistreated by the soldiers, and shell casings, as well as the remains of the charred motorcycle, were found by Colombian troops, the statement added. The army will remain in the municipality and has turned over details of the events to the defense minister.

== Reapproachement ==
Tensions between the two countries slowed months after the initial border controversy. Nearly one year later in July 2016, the Venezuelan government allowed Venezuelans to cross the border into Colombia on specific dates. In that month, over 200,000 Venezuelans poured into Colombia to purchase goods due to shortages in Venezuela. On 12 August 2016, the Venezuelan government officially reopened its border with Colombia, with thousands of Venezuelans, again, entering Colombia to seek escape from Venezuela's crisis. Through 2016, many Venezuelans sought to emigrate into neighboring Colombia following the reopening of the Venezuela–Colombia border.

== Reactions ==
=== Supranational bodies ===
- European Union – On 29 August 2015, the European Union External Action Service stated the closing of the border "followed by forced refoulement puts at risk the overall humanitarian situation, security and stability in the bordering region" further stating that "solutions should be found in full respect of human rights and to ensure the well being of the local population".
- Organization of American States – On 31 August, member nations of the OAS that included many allies to the Venezuelan government and relied on its subsidized oil "blocked a motion to convene a foreign ministers' meeting on the expulsions".
- United Nations – On 28 August 2015, concerned over the "reports of human rights violations occurring in the context of deportations of Colombian" stating that both countries should be settle the situation with "calm discussion and dialogue, firmly grounded in their obligations under international human rights law and refugee law", while concern was also expressed due to Venezuela's "declaration of a 'state of emergency'".

=== Governments ===
- Paraguay – Paraguay's foreign minister, Eladio Loizaga, demanded that "the rights of migrants be respected, to be treated as human" and that "the situation faced by Colombian migrants should be considered with the greatest attention and priority by the countries of UNASUR".
- United States – Barack Obama and the Department of State of the United States of America stated that they were "ready to work with both countries and other regional partners to find a peaceful, humane, and enduring solution", saying that they had respect for "secure borders and safe and orderly migration", though they urged attention upon "the worsening humanitarian situation" on the border.

=== Catholic Church ===
- Holy See – Pope Francis stated on 6 September that "bishops of Venezuela and Colombia have met in recent days to analyze together the painful situation that has sprung up on the border between the two countries" and that he could "see a clear sign of hope" from the meeting.

=== Non-governmental organizations ===
Human rights groups have condemned the Venezuelan government's acts of marking homes for destruction and then demolishing them.

- Amnesty International – On 26 August 2015, Amnesty International stated that countries have "the duty to maintain security and public order, including in border areas and in some extraordinary and unforeseen circumstances in the law, may declare a state of emergency for a limited period" though "these actions may not result in human rights violations". They continued, saying that "the Venezuelan state must ensure that the cases of all persons whose expulsion or deportation under consideration are individually examined in a fair and transparent procedure where they can challenge the expulsion and to have their cases reviewed" and that "Venezuela is obliged to protect the right to life, physical integrity, due process and judicial protection among others, even when a state of emergency applies."

=== Others ===
- President Maduro was also criticized for deporting Colombians with his actions compared to Donald Trump's illegal immigration political position, with the comparison of Maduro and Trump being quickly disseminated throughout the internet. The Venezuelan government's tactics were also compared to the Nazi treatment of the Jews, with comparisons made to the deportations, Nazi ghettos and the marking of homes to be destroyed.
- On 6 September, hundreds of Colombians in Cúcuta protested against the closure of the border wearing colors of the Colombia national football team and carrying Colombian flags. Colombian-Venezuelans also participated in the demonstration.

== See also ==
- Borders of Venezuela
- Colombia–Venezuela border
- Kumarakapay massacre
- Venezuelan refugee crisis
