= Roscio Municipality =

Roscio Municipality Municipio Roscio
- Municipality
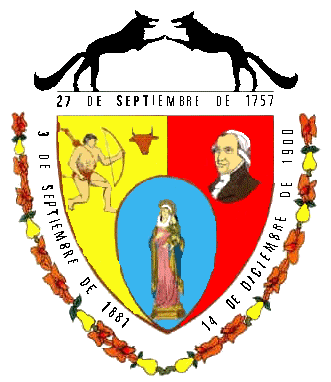
- Flag Coat of arms

- Location in Bolívar

- Location in Venezuela
- Coordinates: 7°11′57″N 62°00′24″W
- Country: Venezuela
- State: Bolívar
- Municipal seat: Guasipati

Government
  - Mayor: Wuihelm Torrellas Martínez (PSUV)

Area
  - Total: 4,907.3 km^{2} (1,894.7 sq mi)

Population (2011)
  - Total: 21,750
  - Density: 4.432/km^{2} (11.48/sq mi)
- Time zone: UTC−4 (VET)
- Area code(s): 0288

The Roscio Municipality is one of the 11 municipalities (municipios) that makes up the Venezuelan state of Bolívar and, according to the 2011 census by the National Institute of Statistics of Venezuela, the municipality has a population of 21,750. The town of Guasipati is the shire town of the Roscio Municipality.

== Demographics ==
The Roscio Municipality, according to a 2007 population estimate by the National Institute of Statistics of Venezuela, has a population of 23,957 (up from 19,777 in 2000). This amounts to 1.6% of the state's population. The municipality's population density is 3.88 inhabitants per square kilometre (10.0/sq mi).

== Government ==
The mayor of the Roscio Municipality is Manuel de Jesús González Marrero, re-elected on October 31, 2004, with 51% of the vote. The municipality is divided into one (two if you count the Capital Roscio section) parishes; Salom.

== See also ==
- Guasipati
- Bolívar
- Municipalities of Venezuela
