= Pemon =

Indigenous people living in areas of Venezuela, Brazil, and Guyana

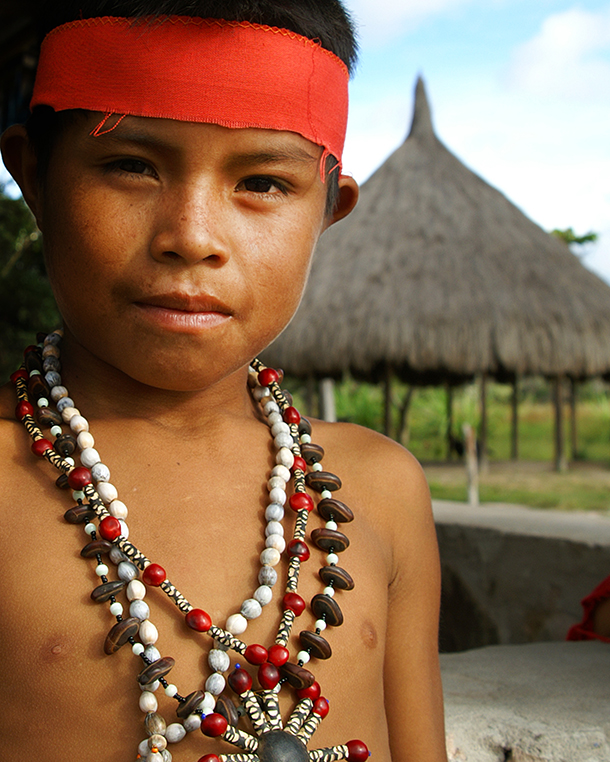
- Pemon boy, Venezuela

Total population
- c. 31,440

Regions with significant populations
- Venezuela: 30,148 (2011)
- Brazil: 792 (2014)
- Guyana: c. 500

Languages
- Pemon, Spanish

Religion
- traditional tribal religion, Roman Catholicism

The Pemon or Pemón (Pemong) are Indigenous people living in areas of Venezuela, Brazil, and Guyana. The Pemon people are divided into three principal dialects and traditions, which are Arekuna, Kamarakoto, and Taurepang.

== People ==
The Pemon are part of the larger Cariban language family, and include six groups including the Arekuna, Ingarikó, Kamarakoto, Tualipang, Mapoyo and Macushi/Makushi (Macuxi or Makuxi in Brazil). While ethnographic data on these groups are scant, Iris Myers produced one of the most detailed accounts of the Makushi in the 1940s, and her work is heavily relied upon for comparisons between historical and contemporary Makushi life.

The Pemon were first encountered by westerners in the 18th century and converted by missionaries to Christianity. Their society is based on trade and considered egalitarian and decentralized, and in Venezuela, funding from petrodollars have helped fund community projects, and ecotourism opportunities are also being developed. In Venezuela, Pemon live in the Gran Sabana grassland plateau dotted with tabletop mountains where the Angel Falls, the world's highest waterfall, plunges from Auyantepui in Canaima National Park.

In Brazil, Pemon live among other Indigenous people near the borders of Venezuela and Guyana in villages within the Terras Indígenas São Marcos and Raposa Serra do Sol. There are 792 Pemon according to a 2014 estimate.

The Makuxi, who are also Pemon speakers, are found in Brazil and Guyana in areas close to the Venezuelan border.

== Lifestyle ==
The Pemon language and people have been extremely affected by tourism and historical events like the establishment of the Canaima camp founded by the Boulton family nearby the Canaima town, where the demographic concentration of Pemon people is established. Many Pemon people work in hotels and tourism. This deeply affected the tradition of the Pemon people, as they turned out to be a Catholic majority population, and left behind their ancestral language and belief, still, many Pemon people, known as "Chamanes" still practice the ancestral religion, mostly for healthcare.

== Language ==
Pemon (in Spanish: Pemón), is a Cariban language spoken mainly in Venezuela, specifically in the Gran Sabana region of Bolívar State. According to the 2001 census there were 15,094 Pemon speakers in Venezuela. It is divided into three principal dialects, which are; Arekuna, Kamarakoto, and Taurepang.

== Myths ==
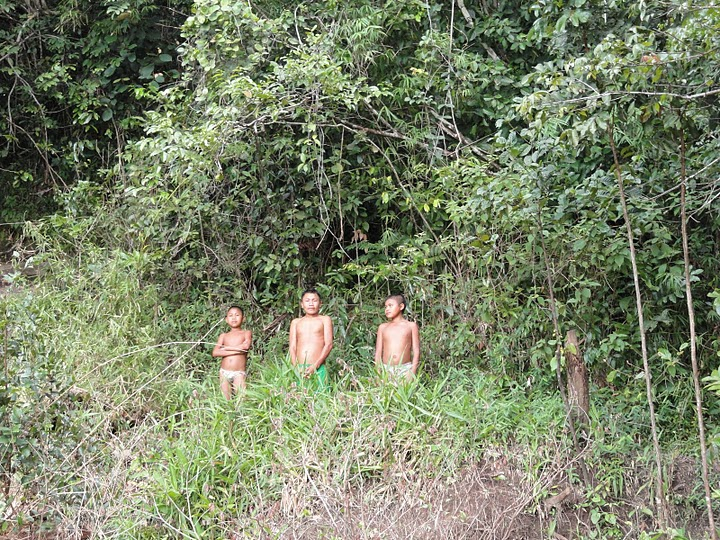
Three Pemon youths

The Pemon have a very rich mythic tradition which is merged into their present Christian faiths. Pemon mythology includes gods residing in the grassland area's table-top mountains called tepui. The mountains are off-limits to the living, as they are also home to ancestor spirits called mawari. The first non-native person to seriously study Pemon myths and language was the German ethnologist Theodor Koch-Grunberg, who visited Roraima in 1912.

Important myths describe the origins of the sun and moon, the creation of the tepui mountains – which dramatically rise from the savannahs of the Gran Sabana — and the activities of the creator hero Makunaíma. Makunaíma is described as an individual or a group of brothers, sons of the sun Wei and a woman made of clay. He goes searching for his father who had been captive of malevolent spirits. After finding his father, Makunaíma finds the "tree of the world", which he cuts down and the resulting stump becomes Mount Roraima. The falling of the tree caused a great cataclysm, with floods and fire, and humans were recreated by Makunaíma. Makunaíma also turned people and animals into stone that are a part of Pemon description of the natural world.

Missionary work among Amerindians has impacted Pemon belief; and Jechikrai is the Pemon adaptation of Jesus Christ.

=== Religion ===
Pemon have polytheistic beliefs. Mythological figures like Makunaima, Kanaima, Iwarrika and Sigu are an important part of their culture. The most important god is Makunaima because, in their opinion, he created the tribe. Furthermore, they associate some natural phenomena to some divinities like Iwarrika who is blamed for flooding the earth. The Shaman plays an important part in their religious practice. He meets the god during hallucinogenic rituals when tobacco and a specific diet are used.

== "Kueka" stone controversy ==
In 1999, Wolfgang Kraker von Schwarzenfeld arranged the transport of a red stone boulder, weighing about 35 metric tons, from Venezuela's Canaima National Park to Berlin Tiergarten for his "global stone" project. Since that time, a dispute had been ongoing of the Pemon trying to get the stone back, involving German and Venezuelan authorities and embassies.

On 16 April 2020, the Kueka stone was finally returned to Venezuela.

== See also ==
- Pemon conflict
