= Ciudad Piar =

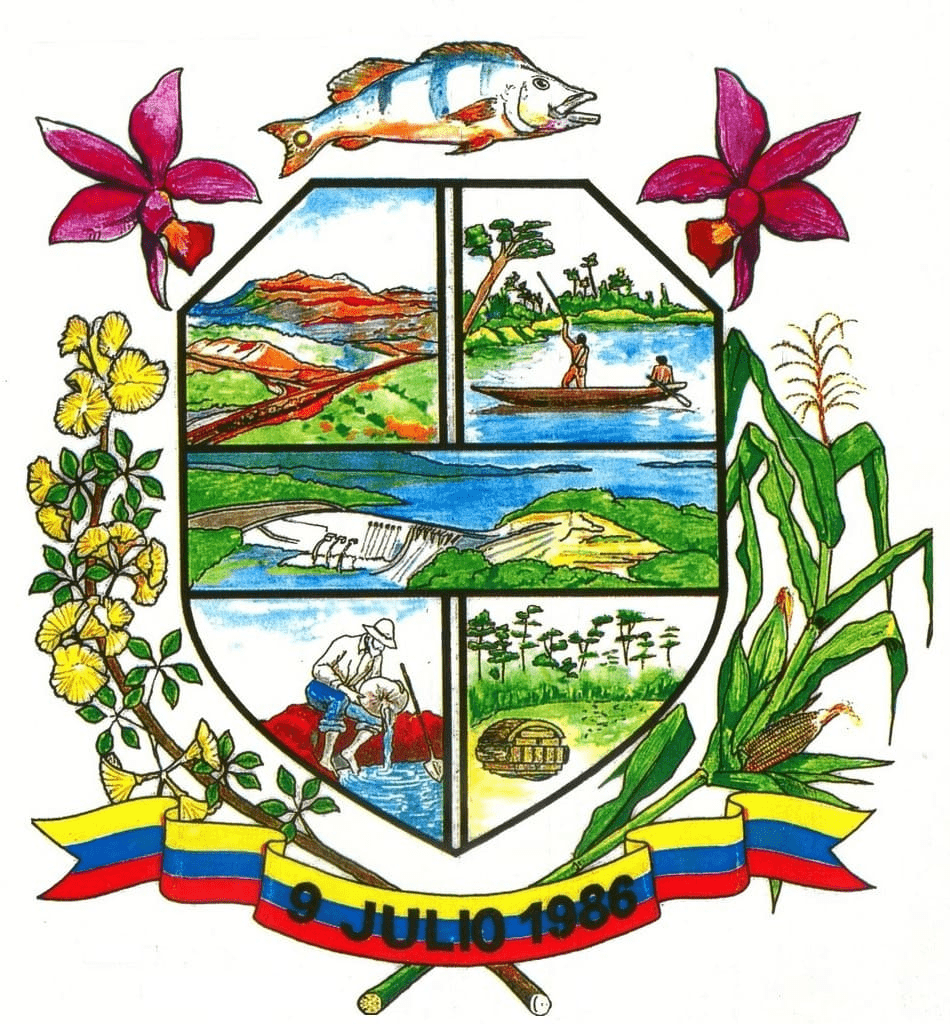
- Coat of arms

- Location within Venezuela
- Coordinates: 7°27′08″N 63°19′12″W
- Country: Venezuela
- State: Bolívar
- Municipality: Angostura
- Alcalde: Nayroby Abreu Botas (PSUV)

Population (2011)
  - Total: 40,918
- Time zone: UTC−4 (VET)
- Climate: Aw

Ciudad Piar is a town located in the state of Bolívar, Venezuela, about 77 kilometres (48 mi) south of Ciudad Bolívar, but a longer 120 kilometres (75 mi) by road. The town is in the eastern foothills of Cerro Bolivar, a mountain that is being mined for iron ore, and just inland from the huge Embalse de Guri reservoir. It is the administrative seat for Angostura Municipality. It is primarily a mining town.
