= Bolívar (state) =

Coordinates: 8°7′19″N 63°33′0″W

Bolívar Estado Bolívar (Spanish)
- State
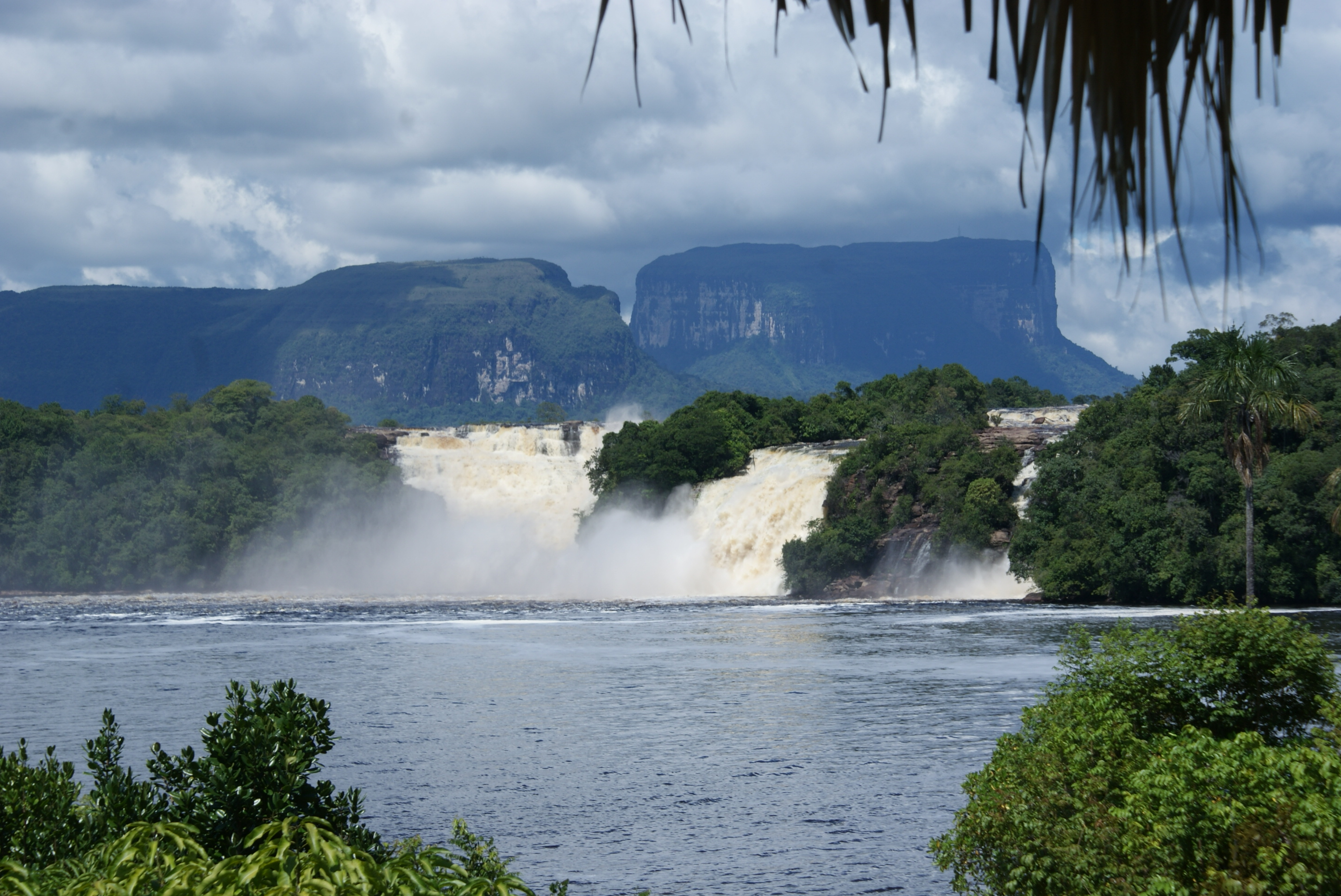
- Canaima National Park

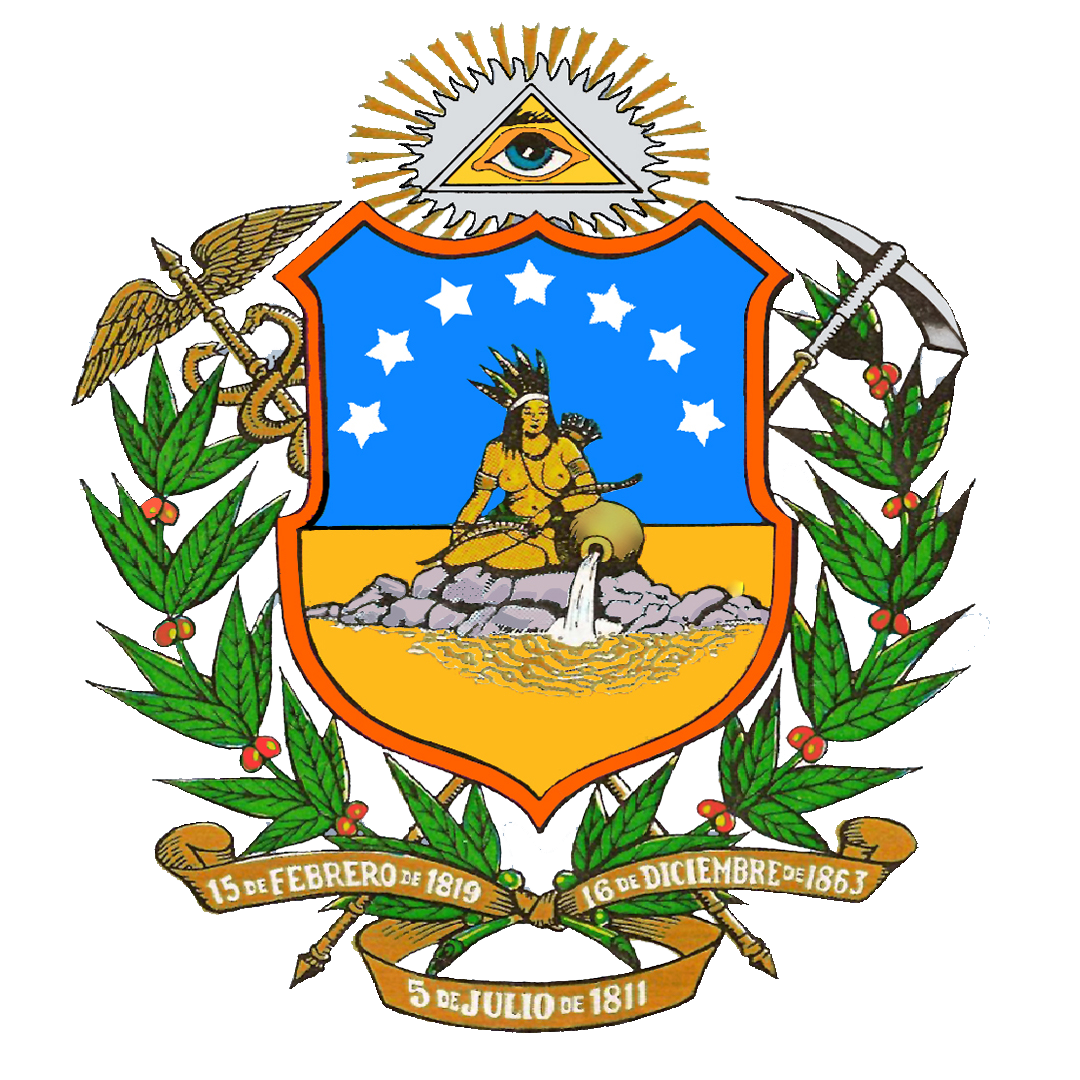
- Flag Coat of arms
- Anthem: Himno del Estado Bolívar
- Location within Venezuela
- Country: Venezuela
- Created: 1901
- Capital: Ciudad Bolívar
- Largest city: Ciudad Guayana

Government
  - Body: Legislative Council
  - Governor: Yulisbeth García

Area
  - Total: 242,801 km^{2} (93,746 sq mi)
  - Rank: 1st
- 26.24% of Venezuela

Population (2020)
  - Total: 1,720,000
  - Rank: 7th
- 5.62% of Venezuela
- Time zone: UTC−4 (VET)
- ISO 3166 code: VE-F
- Emblematic tree: Sarrapia (Diphysa punctata)
- HDI (2019): 0.715 high · 8th of 24
- Website: www.e-bolivar.gob.ve

Bolívar (Spanish: Estado Bolívar, IPA: [esˈtaðo βoˈliβaɾ]) is the largest of the 23 states of Venezuela in area. The state capital city is Ciudad Bolívar and the largest city is Ciudad Guayana. Bolívar State covers a total surface area of 242,801 km^{2} (93,746 sq mi) and as of the 2011 census, had a population of 1,410,964. The state contains Angel Falls.

== History ==
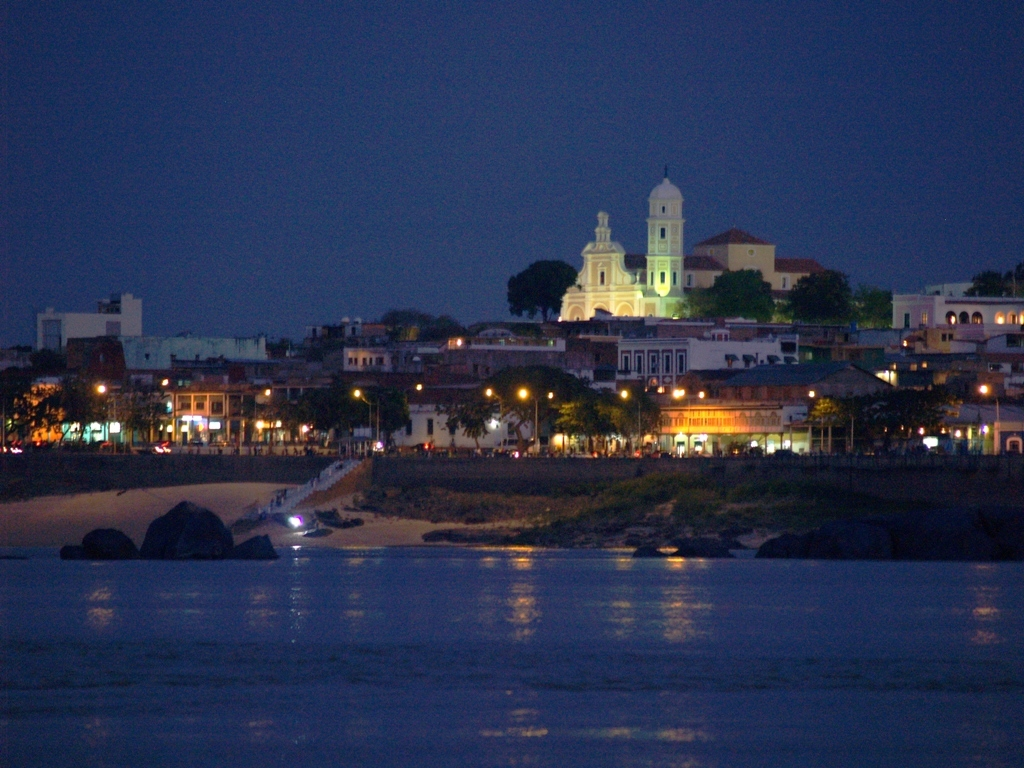
Ciudad Bolívar, capital of Bolívar, known for its colonial architecture

=== Spanish Colonization ===
During the time of the Spanish Empire, it was part of the province of Nueva Andalucía and later it was annexed to the province of Guayana from 1777 when King Charles III created the Captaincy General of Venezuela.

The capital of the state, Ciudad Bolivar was founded on December 21, 1595, by Antonio de Berrío, who had come from Nueva Granada (present-day Colombia) with the mission of populating Guyana. The town, originally called Santo Tomás de Guayana, was a fortified port that had to move three times, since it was the target of constant assaults by Caribbean Indians and European corsairs, among whom Sir Walter Raleigh stood out in 1617.

In 1764 it found a definitive site on the banks of the Orinoco, in its narrowest sector, for which it took the name of Santo Tomás de la Nueva Guayana de la Angostura del Orinoco, known simply as Angostura, a name that has persisted for over 80 years and is still remembered today.

In 1800, Baron Alexander von Humboldt and Aimé Bonpland visited Angostura and from there they went through El Pao to Barcelona and then to Cumaná, thus ending the tour of Venezuela.

=== Independence Era ===
The Congress of Angostura, inaugurated on February 15, 1819, by the Liberator Simón Bolívar, under the inspiration of General Francisco de Miranda's Ideology, represented the second Constituent Congress of the Republic of Venezuela. It was convened in the context of the wars of independence of Venezuela and the New Granada.

In 1821 (during the Great Colombia) it became a department of Orinoco with the largest extension of the time (whose capital was Santo Tomás de la Nueva Guayana de la Angostura del Orinoco or Angostura).

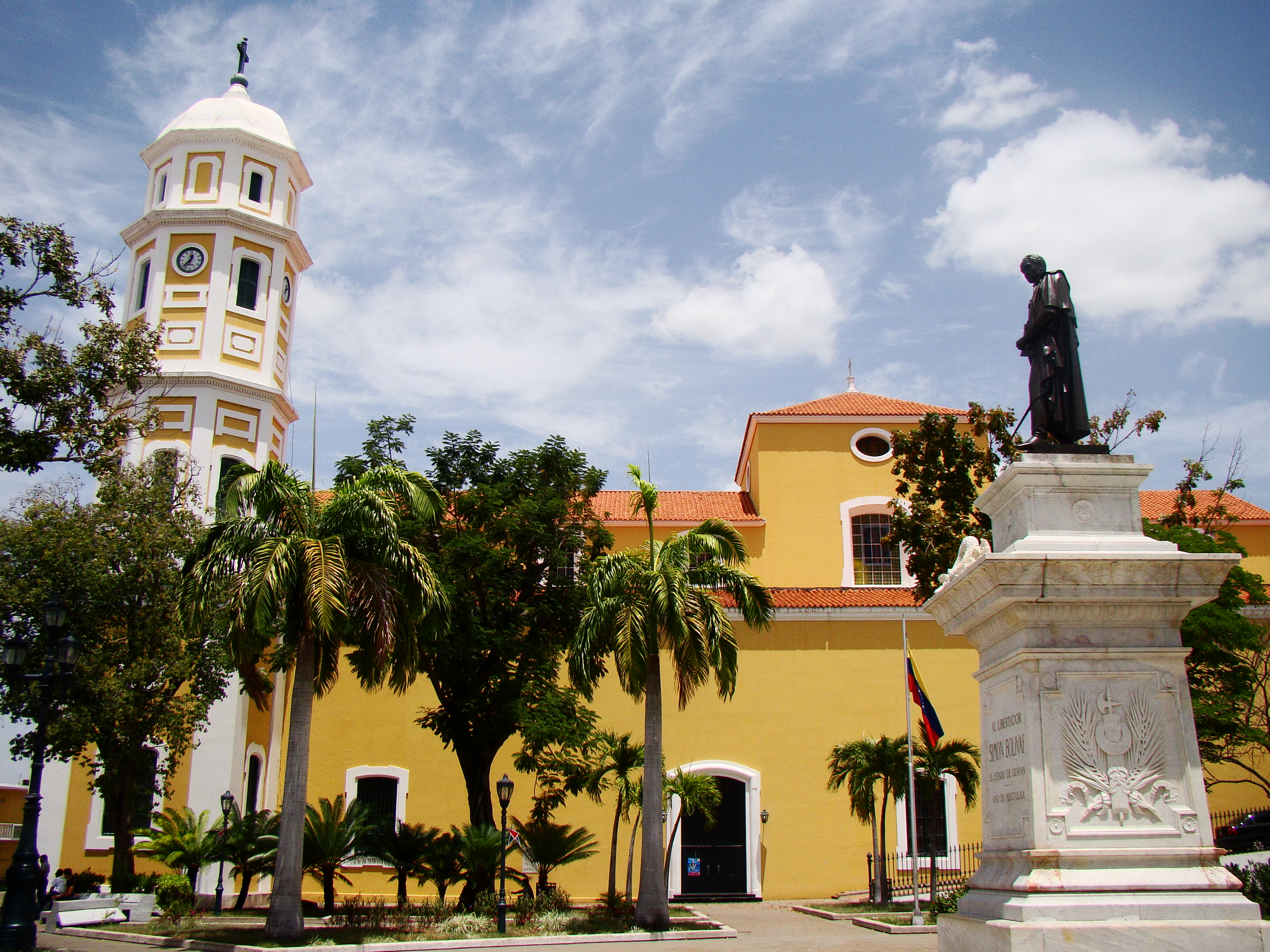
St. Thomas Cathedral in Ciudad Bolivar, opened in 1841

When Gran Colombia was dissolved, the territory changed to the province of Guayana until 1854 when it became the province of Orinoco (whose capital was Ciudad Bolívar).

=== 19th century ===
After the separation in 1856 of the then Federal Territory Amazonas, the province of Guayana was renamed in 1864 as the Sovereign State of Guayana once the Federal Revolution came to power under the command of Juan Crisóstomo Falcón.

In 1864, Guyana became one of the independent states of the United States of Venezuela. In 1879, it was one of the seven states of the Federation, without the territory corresponding to Amazonas which had become Federal Territory Amazonas.

In 1881, it became one of the nine political entities into which the country was divided, receiving the name of Great State Bolivar formed by Guayana and Apure. Its territory was diminished with the creation of the federal territories Yuruari and El Caura (1881), Armisticio (1883) and Delta (1884). Between 1890 and 1893, it recovered these territories.

In 1887, the current state of Delta Amacuro was separated from the state of Guayana. In 1899, the Apure and Guayana States were separated and established their autonomy; and it is from the 1901 Constitution that the name of Guayana State is changed to Bolivar State, as a tribute to the Liberator, Simón Bolívar.

In Angostura, Bolívar convened the Second Congress of the Republic of Venezuela on February 15, 1819. His inaugural speech and the constitution he proposed comprise the last of the three most important documents of his career. The Correo del Orinoco was also published between 1818 and 1820, giving birth to the Venezuelan free press.

=== 20th century ===
Bolívar in 1879–1909

On 21 July 1903, in the vicinity of Ciudad Bolivar, the last battle of the Liberating Revolution was fought where the government army under the command of Juan Vicente Gómez defeated the opposition forces of General Nicolás Rolando. The defeat of the Liberating Revolution marked the end of the 19th century in Venezuela, which was characterized by political instability and great civil wars, giving way to a period of consolidation of the central government under the rule of Andean leaders.

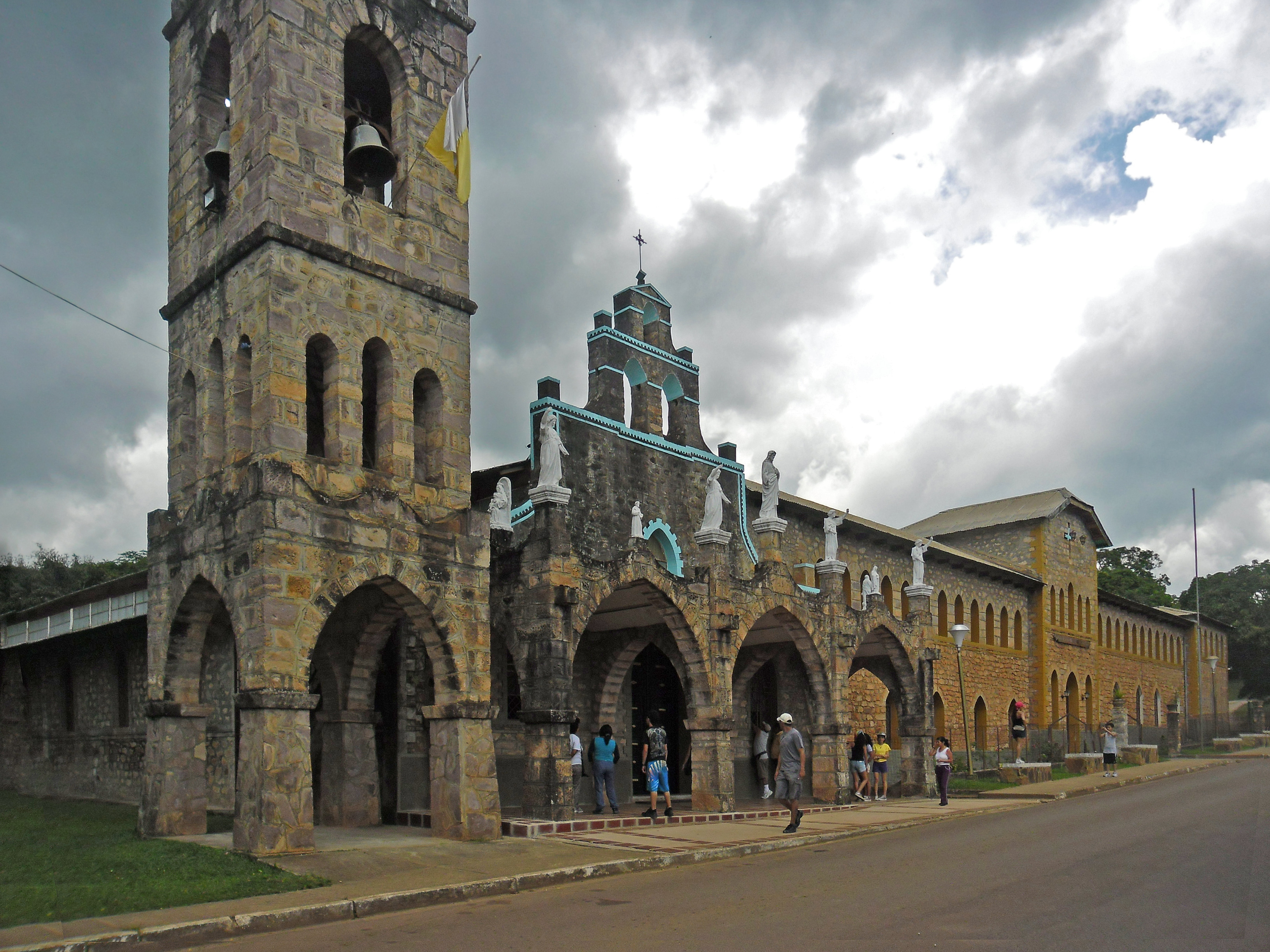
Catholic Cathedral in Santa Elena de Uairén, built in the 1950s

The state gained more autonomy in 1989 when the first elections for governor and legislative assembly were held and the practice of appointments from the central government in Caracas was ended.

On 13 November 2006, the Orinoquia Bridge was inaugurated, the second largest in the country, which facilitates communications between Ciudad Guayana and the opposite bank of the Orinoco River in the states of Anzoátegui and Monagas.

The Orinoco Mining Arc (AMO), officially created, on 24 February 2016, as the Arco Mining Orinoco National Strategic Development Zone, 2 is an area rich in mineral resources that the Republic of Venezuela has been operating since 2017; occupies mostly the north of the Bolivar state and to a lesser extent the northeast of the Amazonas state and part of the Delta Amacuro state. It has 7,000 tons of reserves of gold, copper, diamond, coltan, iron, bauxite and other minerals.

Venezuelan drug trafficker and leader of Tren de Aragua, Niño Guerrero, was killed during a joint operation in Las Claritas, Bolívar, on 12 June 2026, during which intelligence was exchanged between the United States and Venezuelan government. During the operation, clashes occurred with gang members located in the area.

== Geography ==
=== Geographical location ===
It is bordered to the north by the Orinoco River and the States of Delta Amacuro, Monagas, Anzoátegui and Guárico; to the south by the Brazilian state of Roraima; to the southwest by the State of Amazonas; to the east by the territory of Guayana Esequiba, in dispute with the Co-operative Republic of Guyana; and to the west by the State of Apure.

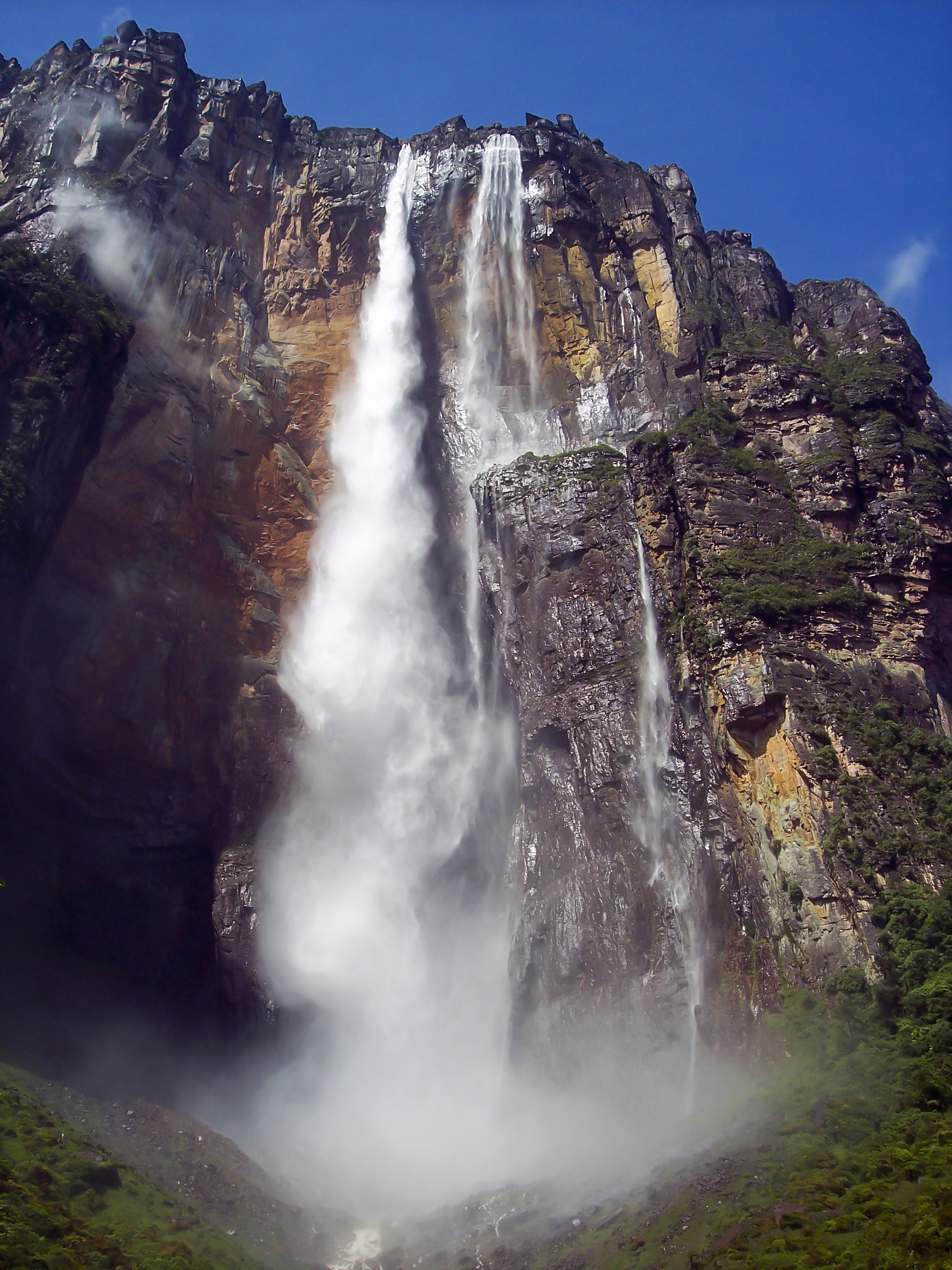
Angel Falls (Salto Ángel), Venezuela, the highest waterfall in the world

Three major landscapes can be recognized in a relief between the Guiana shield: the isolated Orinoco savannahs and low mountains, the mountainous landscape dominated by the tabular peaks of the Tepuis and the valleys of the tributaries of the Orinoco and the lowlands and partly savannahs of the Yuruari, limited to the east by the Imataca mountain range.

=== Relief ===
Almost all of the state is occupied by the Guiana massif; this suffered epirogenic movements that reactivated the basal rock of the shield, cut by fluvial erosion, reached it and gave rise to a staggering of jumps, originating tabular reliefs known as tepuis.

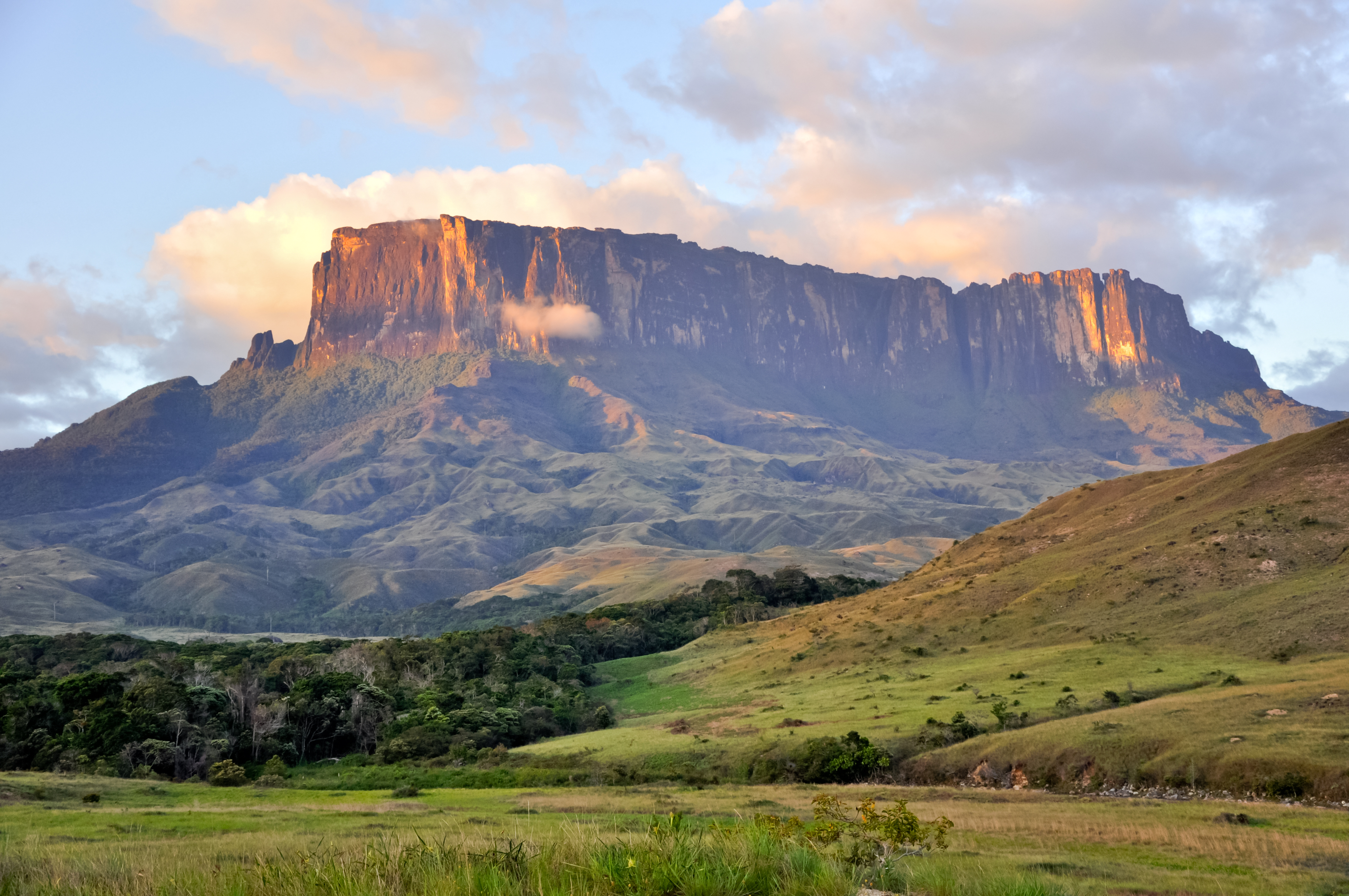
Kukenan Tepuy

The Tepuis are located mainly in the center and south of the structure. The average altitude is 400 metres or 1,310 feet, with a generalized south–north slope. The highest plateaus exceed 2,000 metres or 6,600 feet. The highest point is Mount Roraima (2,875 metres or 9,432 feet), located in the Pacaraima Range, which continues south with those of Parima and Tapirapeco. The north of the massif is quite homogeneous, with heights below 400 m and numerous witness hills. In the northeast, the Nuria and Imataca mountains stand out, as well as plateaus and hills over 500 metres or 1,640 feet high drained by the Yuruari River. The southeast sector is separated from the northwest sector by the Erebato River and the upper Ventuari Valley. It comprises the Great Savannah and the rest of the territory west of the Caroni River, made up of three high plateaus. The southwest of the massif is made up of lowlands through which the Ventuari, Alto Río Negro and Alto Orinoco rivers flow, with flat topography interrupted by witness hills.

=== Hydrography ===
Except for the area comprised in the Yuruari- Cuyuni river basin, the entire state is included in the Orinoco drainage system. Among the most important rivers are the Caroní, the Paragua and the Caura, etc. All of them dig their courses through a rugged topography in the hard rocks of the Guiana shield, giving rise to rapid valleys and waterfalls. In the case of the Caroní River, these unevennesses have allowed the establishment of powerful hydroelectric plants. The Guri Reservoir and the Simón Bolívar Hydroelectric Plant (formerly Raúl Leoni), which covers more than 80,000 hectares, is the most important center for electricity generation in Venezuela. The Churún River, a tributary of the Caroní River, flows from the Auyan Tepui plateau, with a 936.60-meter drop: Angel Falls, the highest in the world.

=== Climate ===
The average annual temperature (Max-Min) is between 27 and 30 °C (80.6 and 86.0 °F) in the Puerto Ordaz area, between 27 and 31 °C (80.6 and 87.8 °F) in the Ciudad Bolivar zone, and between 18 and 23 °C (64.4 and 73.4 °F) in the Gran Sabana Zone. The climate is tropical, although it varies according to the zones; thus, the low areas present high temperatures, which reach an average of 27 °C or 80.6 °F, and abundant rainfall. The variation of the climate of the extensive territory is determined by the altitude and the winds since the latitude (between 4° and 8° of North latitude) places it totally in the equatorial strip. The low northern lands, influenced by the east and northeast winds, are characterized by a rainy season and a dry season, both very marked; the southern lands receive winds loaded with humidity from the Amazon depression and from the southeast that condense at the contact of the elevations producing intense rains of more than 1600 mm.

=== Area ===
The State of Bolivar is the largest state in Venezuela and covers a large area of 242,801 km^{2}, which represents 26.49% of the national total. In addition, de Iure claims the territories of Guayana Esequiba south of the Cuyuni River, Cuyuni-Mazaruni, Potaro-Siparuni and Alto Tacutu-Alto Esequibo, which would increase the territory by 124,414 km^{2}.

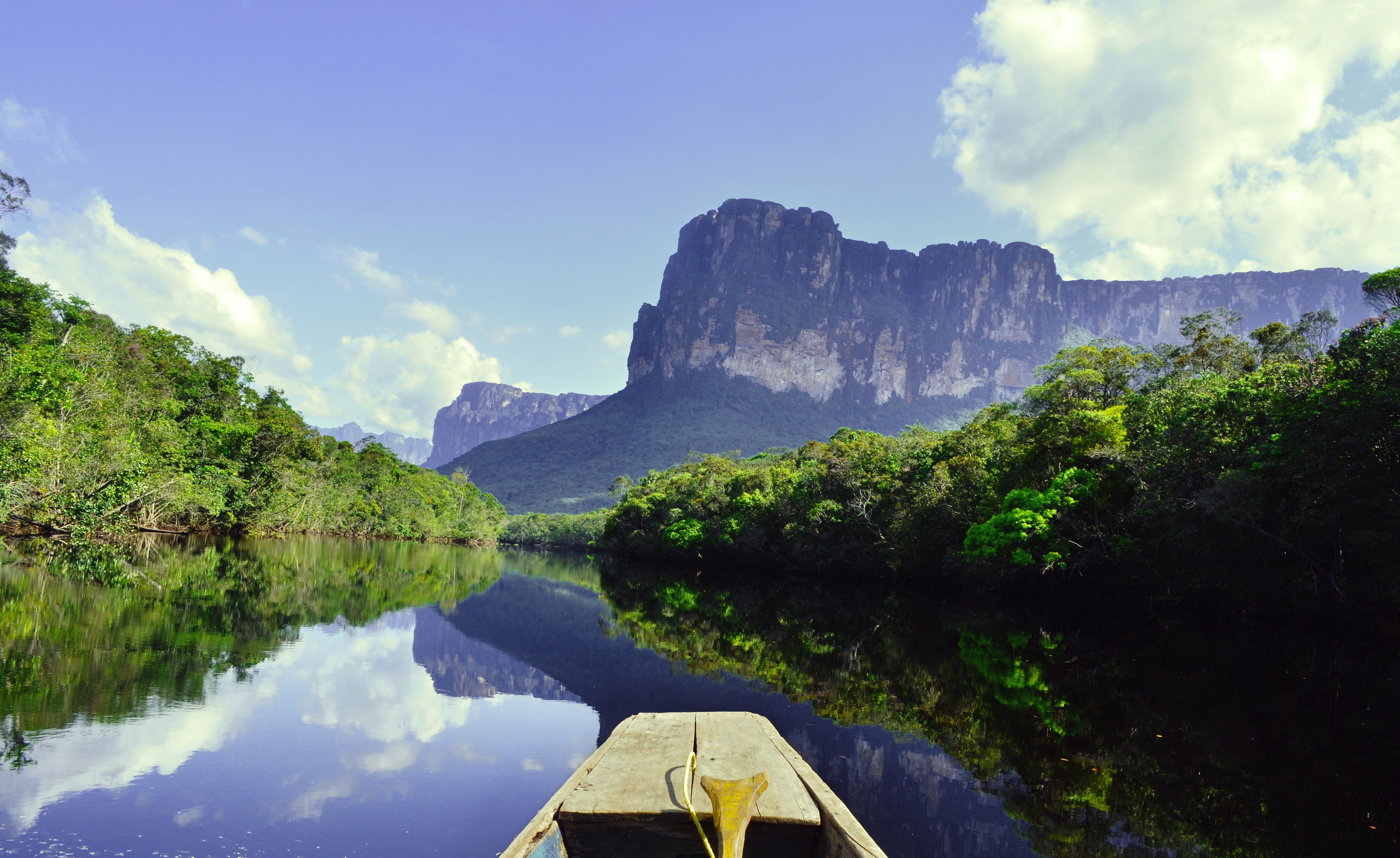
Carrao River and Auyantepui Mountain

The geography of the State of Bolivar is as follows: the State of Bolivar is located in the southeast of Venezuela, it has jungle vegetation and a savannah climate, the State is mostly limited by the Orinoco River. It borders on several Venezuelan states and on the republics of Guyana and Brazil.

== Politics and government ==
The State is autonomous and politically equal to the rest of the Federation. It organizes its administration and its public powers through the Constitution of the State of Bolivar, approved by the Legislative Council in Ciudad Bolivar on July 2, 2001.

=== Executive Power ===
It is composed of the Governor of the State of Bolivar and a group of State Secretaries. The Governor is elected by the people through direct and secret vote for a period of four years and with the possibility of being reelected continuously, being in charge of the state administration. The current Governor is Yulisbeth García,(PSUV).

Like the other 23 federal entities of Venezuela, the State maintains its own police force, which is supported and complemented by the National Police and the Venezuelan National Guard.

=== Legislative power ===
The State Legislature is the responsibility of the unicameral Legislative Council of the State of Bolivar, elected by the people through direct and secret vote every four years, with the possibility of continuous re-election, under a system of proportional representation of the population of the State and its municipalities. The State has 15 deputies, of which 4 belong to the opposition and 11 to the ruling party, including a representation of the indigenous peoples and communities of the State of Bolivar.

== Demographics ==
Historical population
| Year | Pop. | ±% p.a. |
|---|---|---|
| 1873 | 28,287 | — |
| 1881 | 41,012 | +4.75% |
| 1891 | 55,589 | +3.09% |
| 1920 | 65,852 | +0.59% |
| 1926 | 75,227 | +2.24% |
| 1936 | 83,159 | +1.01% |
| 1941 | 94,522 | +2.59% |
| 1950 | 127,436 | +3.38% |
| 1961 | 213,543 | +4.80% |
| 1971 | 391,665 | +6.25% |
| 1981 | 668,340 | +5.49% |
| 1990 | 900,310 | +3.37% |
| 2001 | 1,214,846 | +2.76% |
| 2011 | 1,413,115 | +1.52% |
Source: "XIV CENSO NACIONAL DE POBLACIÓN Y VIVIENDA – Resultados por Entidad Federal y Municipio del Estado Bolívar" (PDF). Instituto Nacional de Estadística.

=== Populated centres ===
Ciudad Bolívar is the state capital, famous for its colonial architecture, although Ciudad Guayana is by far the most populated town in the state and its economic heart. The State of Bolivar is made up of several towns, but some are outstanding for certain reasons, making some of these towns more livable than others. Some of these large populations are:

- Ciudad Guayana (made up of San Felix de Guayana and Puerto Ordaz)
- Ciudad Bolívar
- Caicara del Orinoco
- Ciudad Piar
- El Callao
- El Dorado
- Maripa
- Santa Helena of Uairen
- Tumeremo
- Upata
- Guasipati
- El Palmar

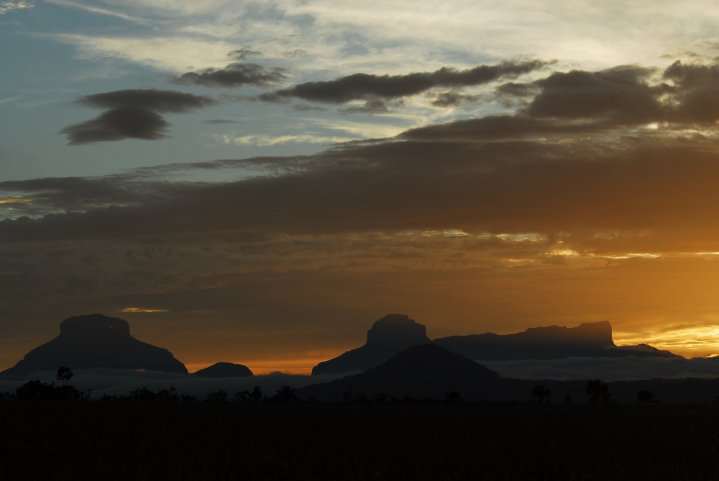
Sunset in the Gran Sabana Municipality

=== Race and ethnicity ===
According to the 2011 Census, the racial composition of the population was:

| Racial composition | Population | % |
|---|---|---|
| Mestizo | —N/a | 55.1 |
| White | 646,059 | 39.2 |
| Black | 67,573 | 4.1 |
| Other race | —N/a | 1.6 |

=== Indigenous Peoples ===
The State of Bolivar is home to several ethnic groups that originated in the country. Among the main groups are the Pemones, the Yekuana, the Sanemá, the Panares, the Hotis and the Piaroas. All of these groups speak their own languages, although most also speak Spanish.

== Municipalities ==
Bolívar State is sub-divided into eleven municipalities (municipios), given below with their administrative centres, areas and populations:

Municipality of Bolívar

| | Municipality | Capital | Area (km^{2}) | Population (Census 2011) | Population Estimate 30 June 2016 |
|---|---|---|---|---|---|
| 1. | Angostura | Ciudad Piar | 56,916 | 40,927 | 52,205 |
| 2. | Caroní | Ciudad Guayana | 1,612 | 704,585 | 892,269 |
| 3. | Cedeño | Caicara del Orinoco | 46,020 | 67,000 | 101,800 |
| 4. | El Callao | El Callao | 2,223 | 21,769 | 25,338 |
| 5. | Gran Sabana | (Santa Elena de Uairén) | 32,990 | 28,450 | 37,930 |
| 6. | Heres | Ciudad Bolívar | 5,851 | 342,280 | 414,154 |
| 7. | Padre Pedro Chien | El Palmar | 2,275 | 15,488 | 18,376 |
| 8. | Piar | Upata | 15,900 | 98,274 | 124,476 |
| 9. | Roscio | Guasipati | 6,182 | 21,750 | 27,226 |
| 10. | Sifontes | Tumeremo | 24,393 | 50,082 | 62,798 |
| 11. | Sucre | Maripa | 46,166 | 20,359 | 24,327 |
| | Total State | Ciudad Bolívar | 240,528 | 1,410,964 | 1,780,899 |

== Economy ==
In the State of Bolivar there are great energy sources that are very important for Venezuela (the Guri Dam, among others), famous agricultural products (Guiana cheese, cotton, yucca, cassava, white and brown catalinas, naiboa, among others), and many minerals in great demand (iron, gold, bauxite, among others). located in Ciudad Guayana.

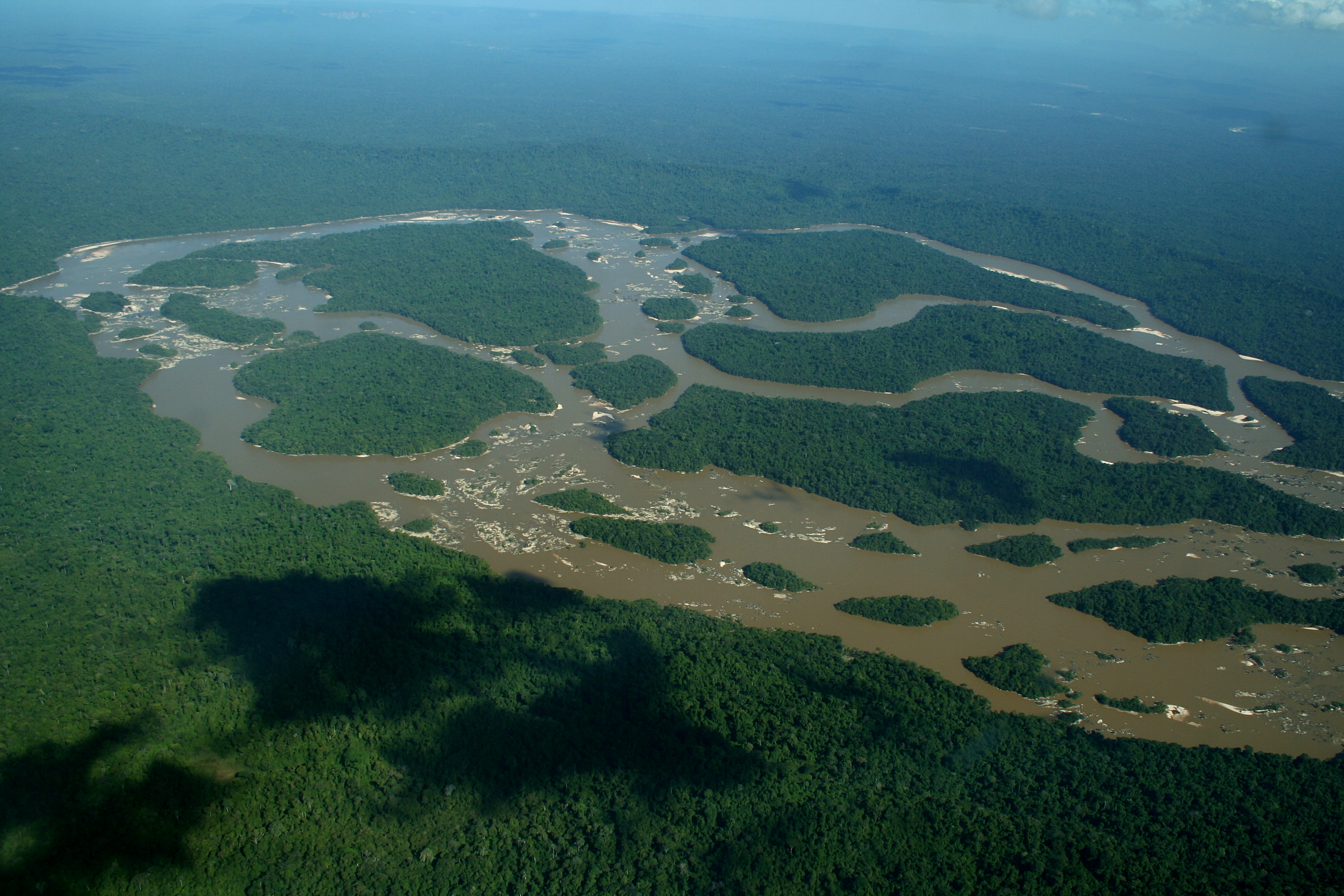
Bolivar State has extensive jungle regions and vast forest and mining resources.

=== Agriculture ===
The agricultural sector of Bolivar State has little significance, both at the state and national level. The soil, topography, and climate characteristics have led to consider the area as a strong restriction for agricultural development, since a large part of its soils are composed of highly siliceous rocks, with low moisture retention capacity and strong acid reaction. Nevertheless, the exploitation of a great variety of agricultural items, the immense reserves of forest resources, allow us to foresee that through the use of appropriate technology, irrigation and selection of the size of the exploitation, this sector could contribute in an important way in the integral development of the area.

=== Siderurgy ===
Bolivar State has the Siderurgica del Orinoco (SIDOR), which is in charge of steel production with Direct Reduction technologies and Electric Arc Furnaces, with natural resources available in the Guayana region.

=== Coltan ===
By 2017, coltan production will begin through Parguaza, a company established by the Venezuelan state and the Venezuelan Corporation Faoz.

=== Forest Resources ===
Some woods are exploited, many of them precious like bucare, mahogany and others like plum, crawl, guamo, sarrapia and carob.

== Tourism ==
The state of Bolivar has some of the most important tourist attractions in Venezuela and South America among which the Angel Falls (the world's largest waterfall) and numerous characteristic mountains called Tepuis such as Mount Roraima, as well as many natural wells, caves, rivers, fluvial islands, forests, rock formations, waterfalls and lakes of all types.

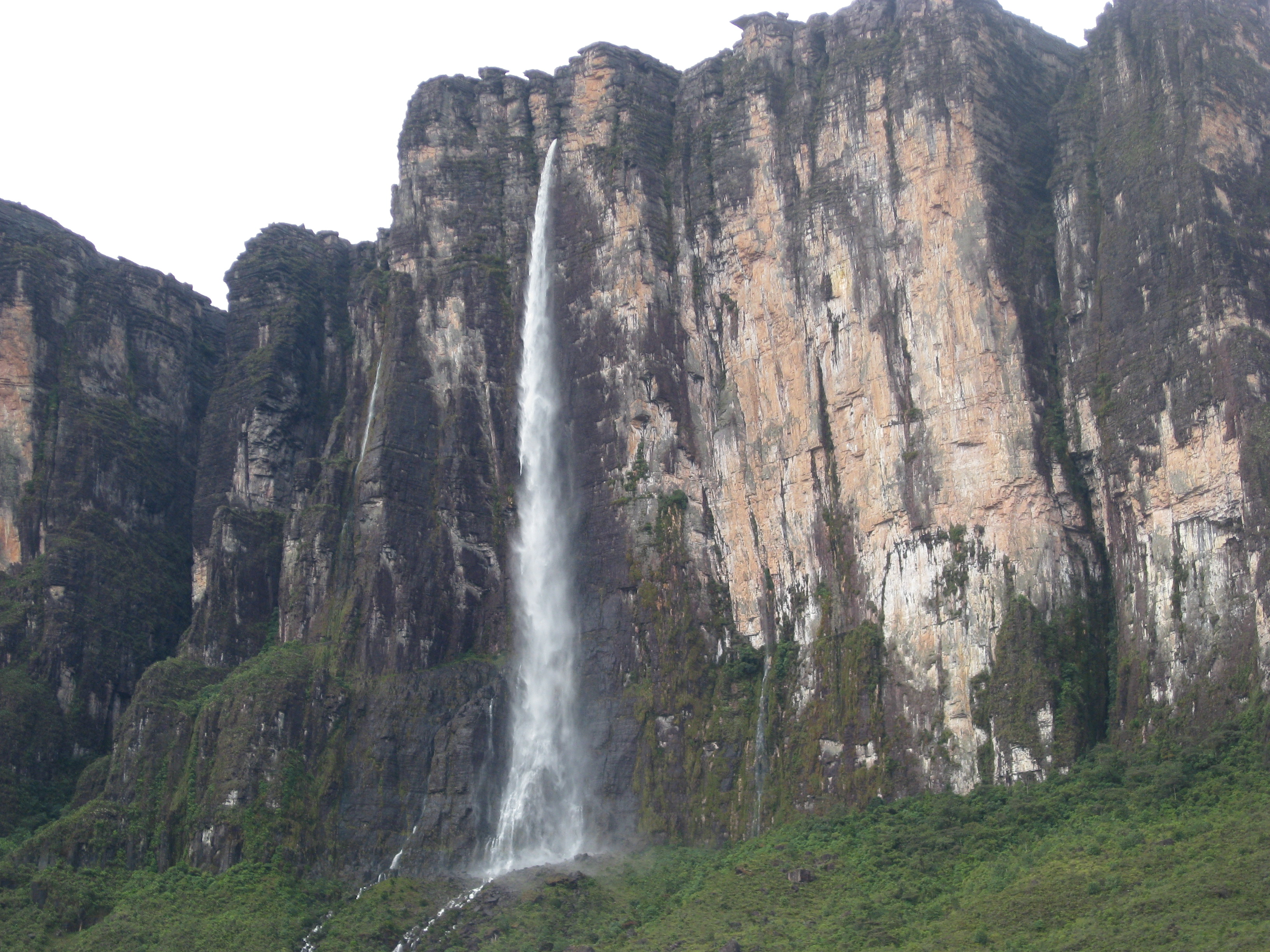
Kukenan falls (Salto Kukenan)

=== Main Places of interest ===
- Historical Zone of Ciudad Bolívar
- Canaima National Park
- Lagoon of Canaima

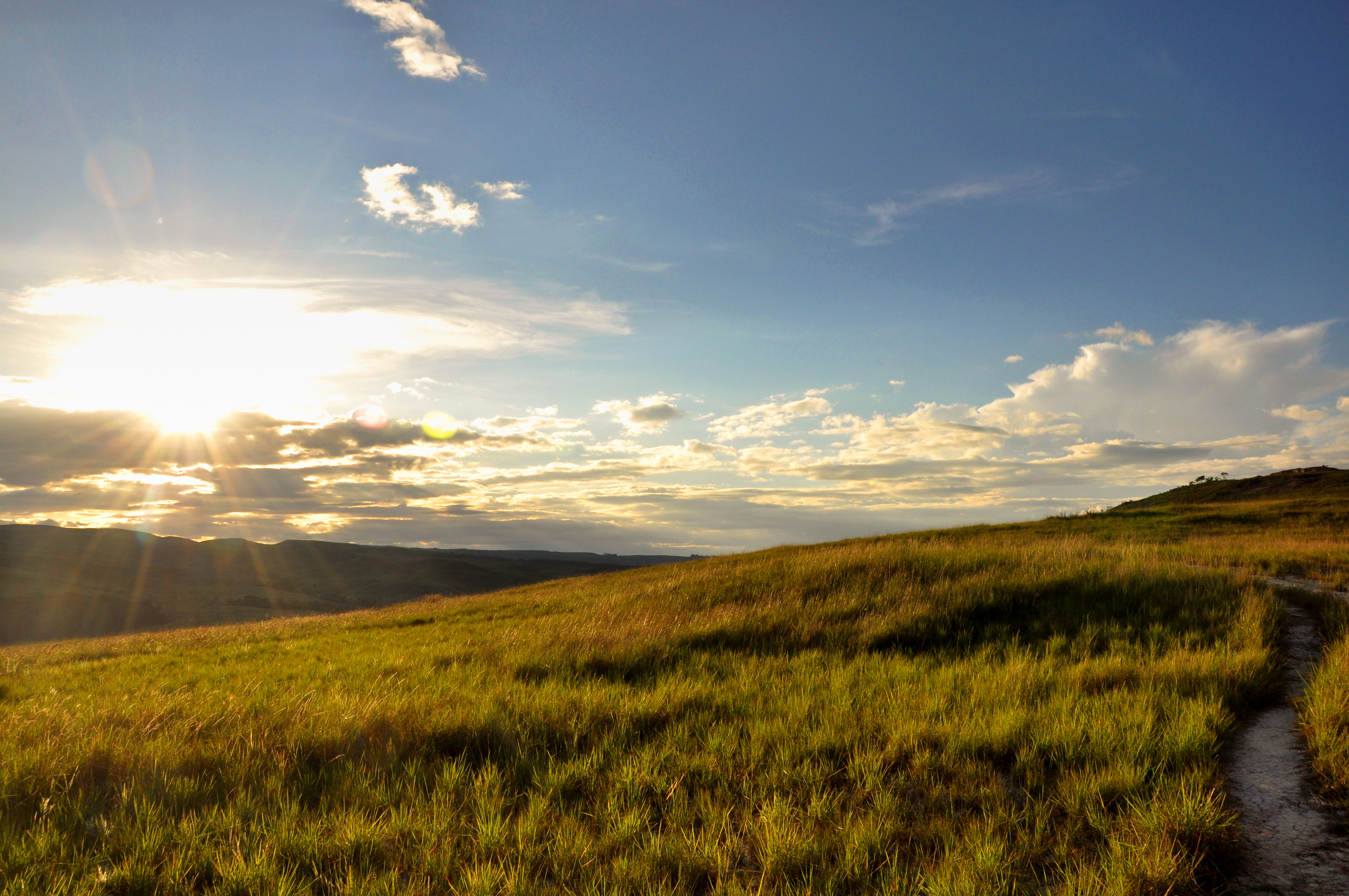
La Gran Sabana

- El Sapo and El Sapito Falls
- Yuri Falls
- Mayupa Rapids
- Pozo de la Felicidad (Pit of the Happiness) (Saró Marú)
- Orquídea Island
- Ratón Island
- Angel Falls or Korepakupai Vená
- Ayan-tepui
- Kavac Indian village
- Cave Uruyén

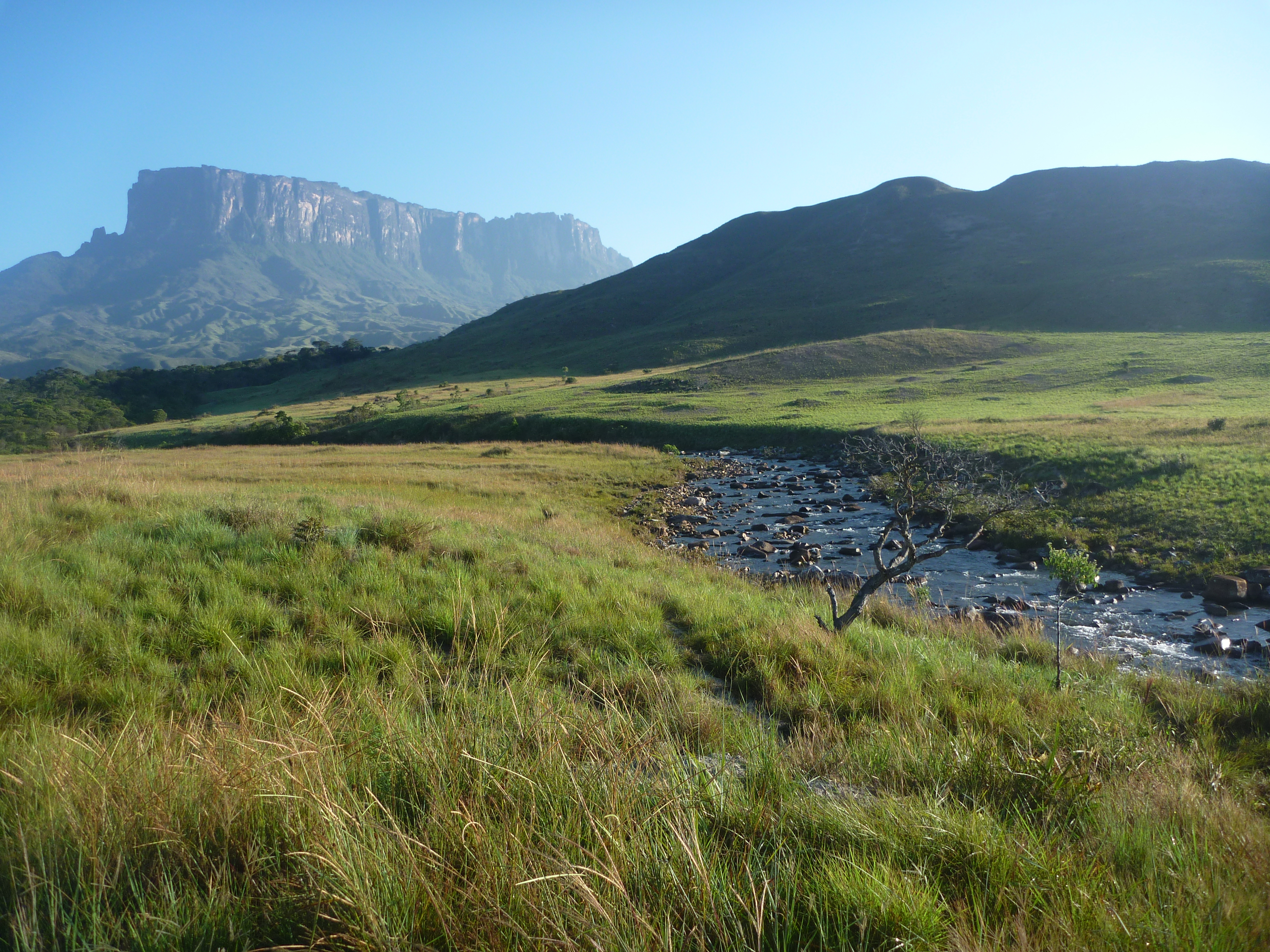
Tek River

- Kamarata Indian village
- Wareipa Indian community
- El Encanto Falls
- Avak Indian community
- Roberto Beach
- Kanwaripa Indian community
- Caroní River
- La Maloca Indian village

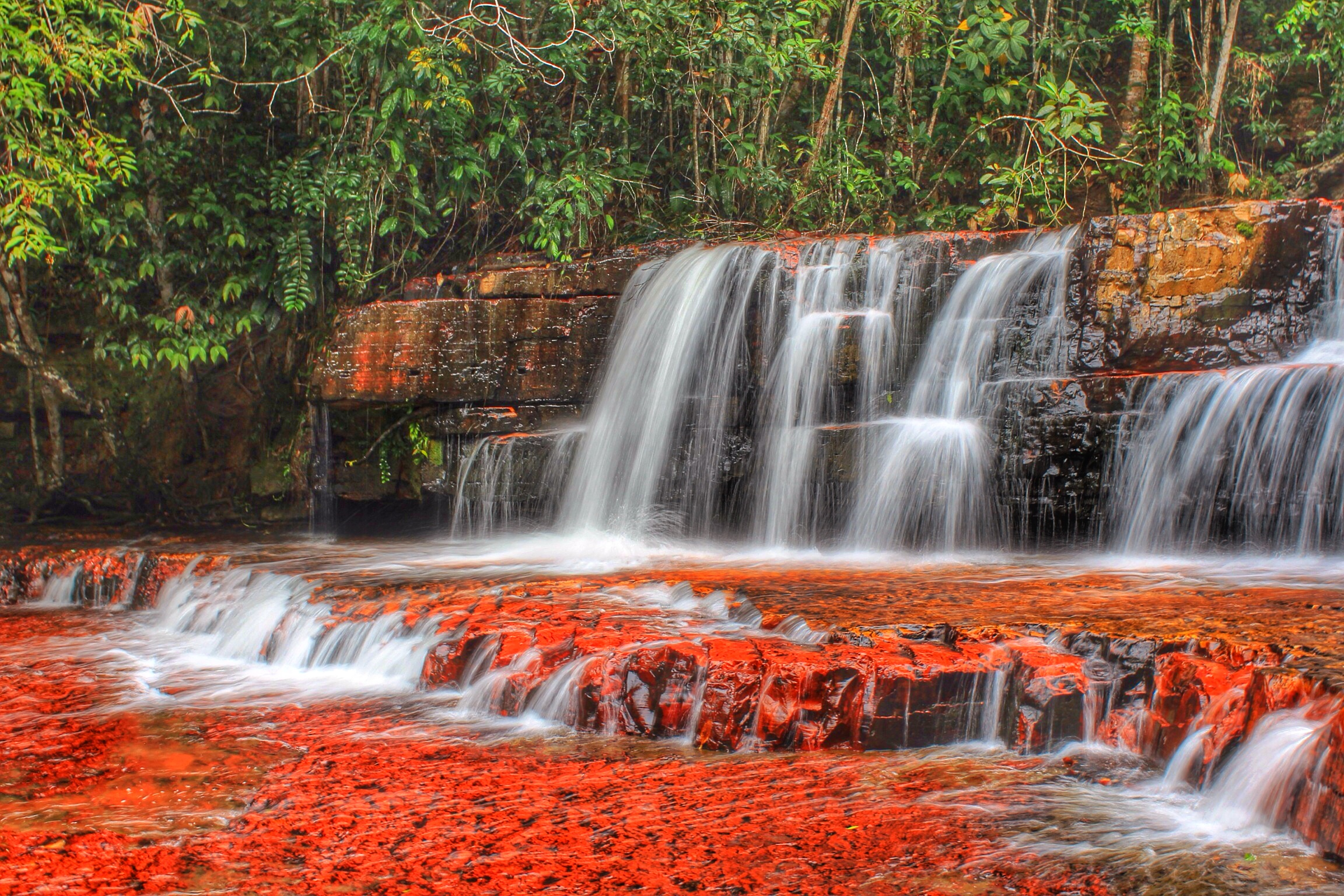
Quebrada de Jaspe

- Kukenán Falls (in the Tepui Kukenán or Matawí)
- La Piedra de La Virgen (The rock of the virgin)
- El Danto Falls
- La Arenaria
- Monumento al Soldado Pionero
- Aponwao I River
- Tarotá Baths
- Toroncito Ravine
- Toron merú Falls
- Karuay Falls

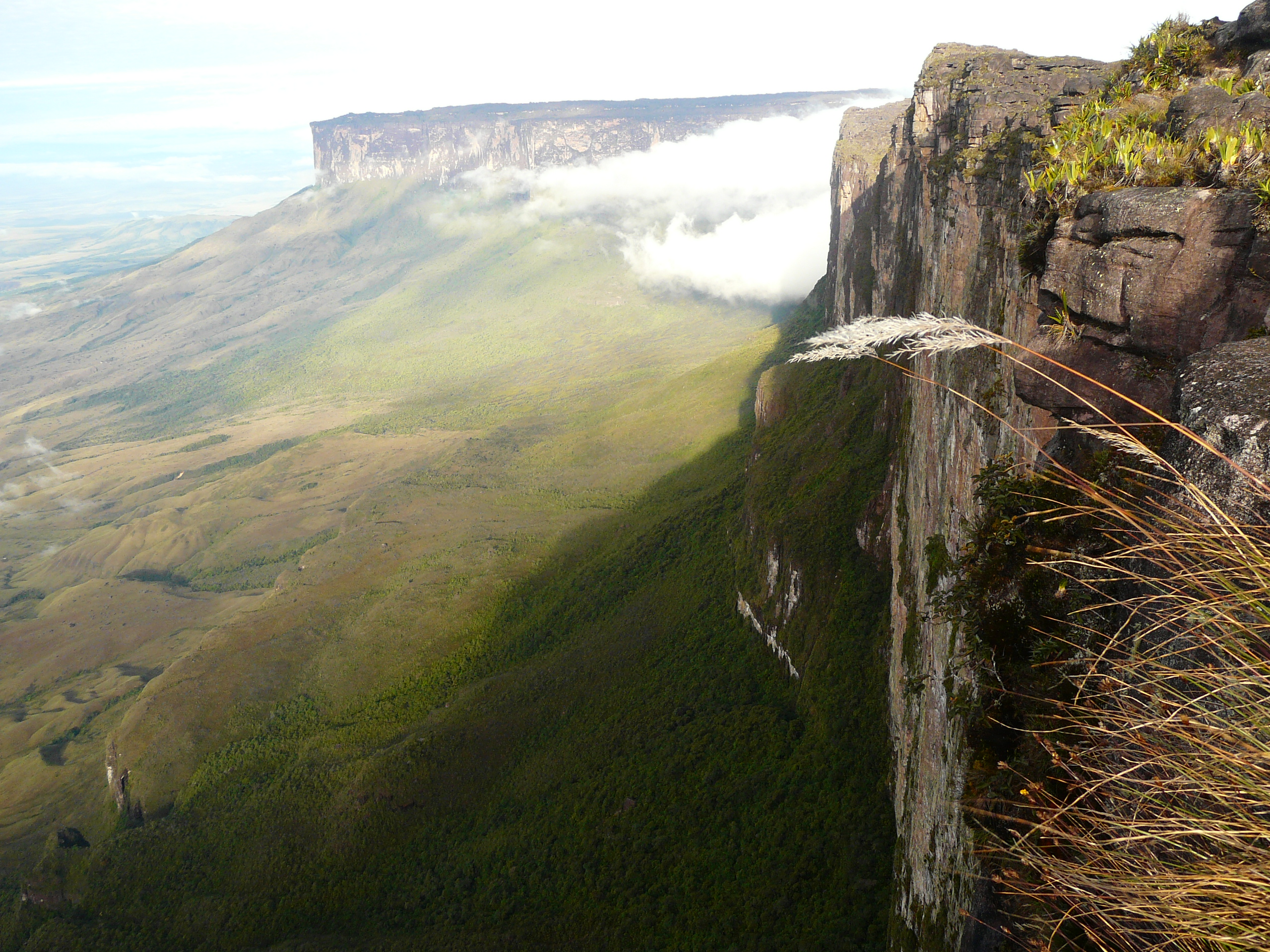
Mount Roraima cliffs

- Chinak merú Falls (Aponwao falls)
- Parupa
- Anotén
- Chivatón Falls
- Mission of Kavanayen
- Kamoirán Rapids
- Kama merú Falls
- Arapán merú (Pacheco Ravine)
- Soruapa River or Woimeri
- San Francisco de Yuruaní (Kumaracapai) Indian Community
- Jasper Creek (Kako Parú or Jaspe Ravine)
- Urué merú
- Kukenán Bridge River
- Paraitepui Indian Community of Roraima
- Wonkén Indian Community
- La Gran Sabana (Spanish: Great Plains)
- Angel Falls
- Monte Roraima
- Sarisariñama
- Kavanayén
- Santa Elena de Uairen
- Cerro Bolivar, a large iron mine
- Caroni River

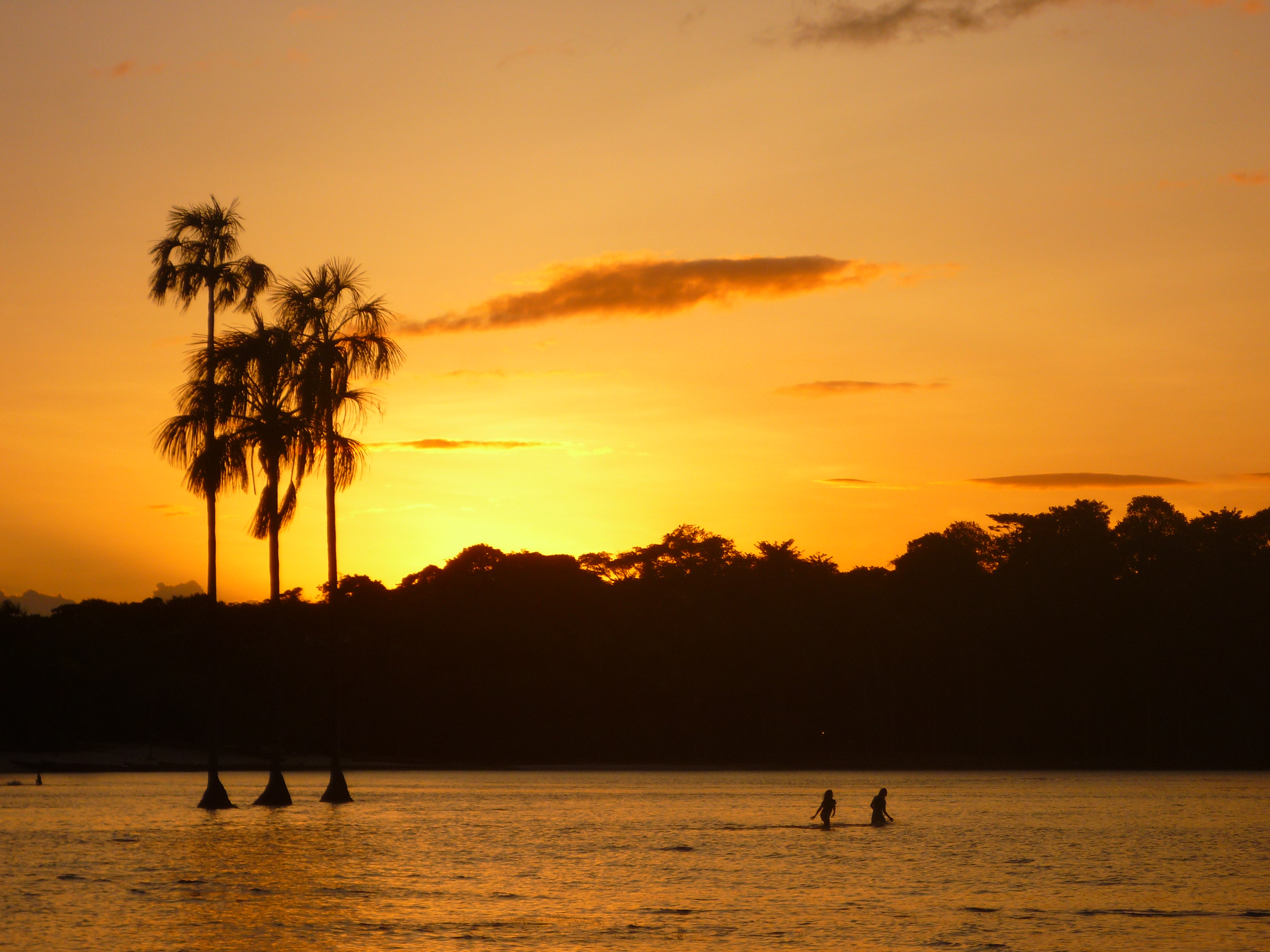
Canaima Lagoon

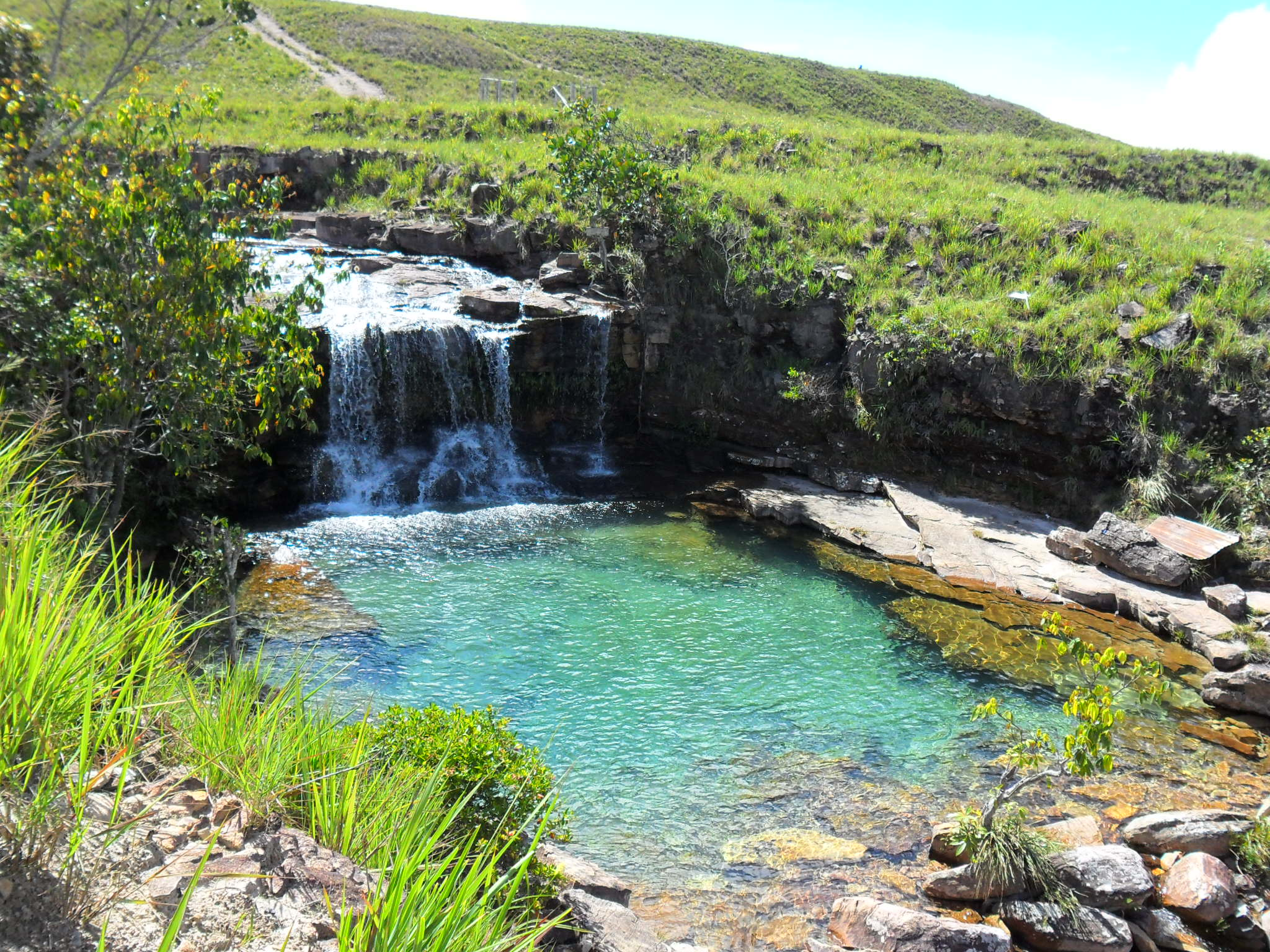
Pozo Azul, Quebrada Pacheco

=== Historical sites ===
==== Castles of Guayana ====
30 km from San Félix on the road to Piacoa in the State of Delta Amacuro, you will find Los Castillos de Guayana, buildings built on rocky hills on the right bank of the Orinoco River during the colonial era to protect Santo Tomé de Guayana from attacks by pirates and adventurers who feverishly sought El Dorado.

==== Castillo de San Francisco de Asís ====
The first of the castles, San Francisco de Asís (Fuerte Villapol) was built on the banks of the Orinoco in the 17th century between 1678 and 1684, as referred to by Gerónimo Martínez-Mendoza, by order of the Governor Cap. Tiburcio de Axpe y Zúñiga, in the narrowest part of the Orinoco after Angostura, on the land where San Francisco's auspices once stood, established by Don Antonio de Berrío, the first governor of Guayana and founder of Santo Tomé de Guayana.

==== Castillo San Diego ====
Years later and to reinforce the defenses of the first castle was built the Castle of El Padrastro or San Diego – construction began in 1747 – so called because it was located on a hillock or stepfather, from where you can see the Castle of San Francisco which it protects. These castles were restored in 1897 by the then President of Venezuela, Joaquín Crespo, who renamed them Fuerte Campo Elías al Castillo de San Diego and Fuerte Villapol al Castillo de San Francisco, in honor of these heroes who, despite being born in Spain, fought in the Republican ranks during the war of independence.

==== Ruins of the Caroni Missions ====
They are called the Ruins of the Mission of the Purísima Concepción del Caroni, or better known as "Las Misiones del Caroni". These ruins served as the governing house of the Catalan Capuchins, and were declared a National Historic Monument on August 2, 1960. It exemplifies a magnificent building belonging to the colonial architecture, finally built with stones, bricks, tiles, wood and mortar, which gave it a structure strong enough to be preserved through the centuries.

A bell tower, the chapel and a mural composed of images representing the sun and moon, clouds and angels, as well as silhouettes, which presumably represent the Virgin of the Immaculate Conception and Saint Francis of Assisi, are components that can be seen inside this rectangular space that follows the structure of the main nave of the temple or church. The same is provided with a parking lot that communicates to the temple by means of a paved road, and connects to the bank of the Macagua reservoir.

== Culture ==
In many indigenous cultures of the State of Bolivar there are musical and artisan manifestations. In other environments the joropo is danced, exactly in the northwest of the state, due to the proximity of the plains of Guariqueños and Apureños. The passage, the blows, the tunes to the sound of the harp, cuatro and maracas, are characteristic of this area of Bolivar. The carnivals in El Callao are very colorful and have already gained fame and tradition with the peculiar Guayana Calypso. This dance originated with the arrival of the Antilleans who brought their customs and their typical English, it was mixed with ours emerging along with the local patois and many other customs.

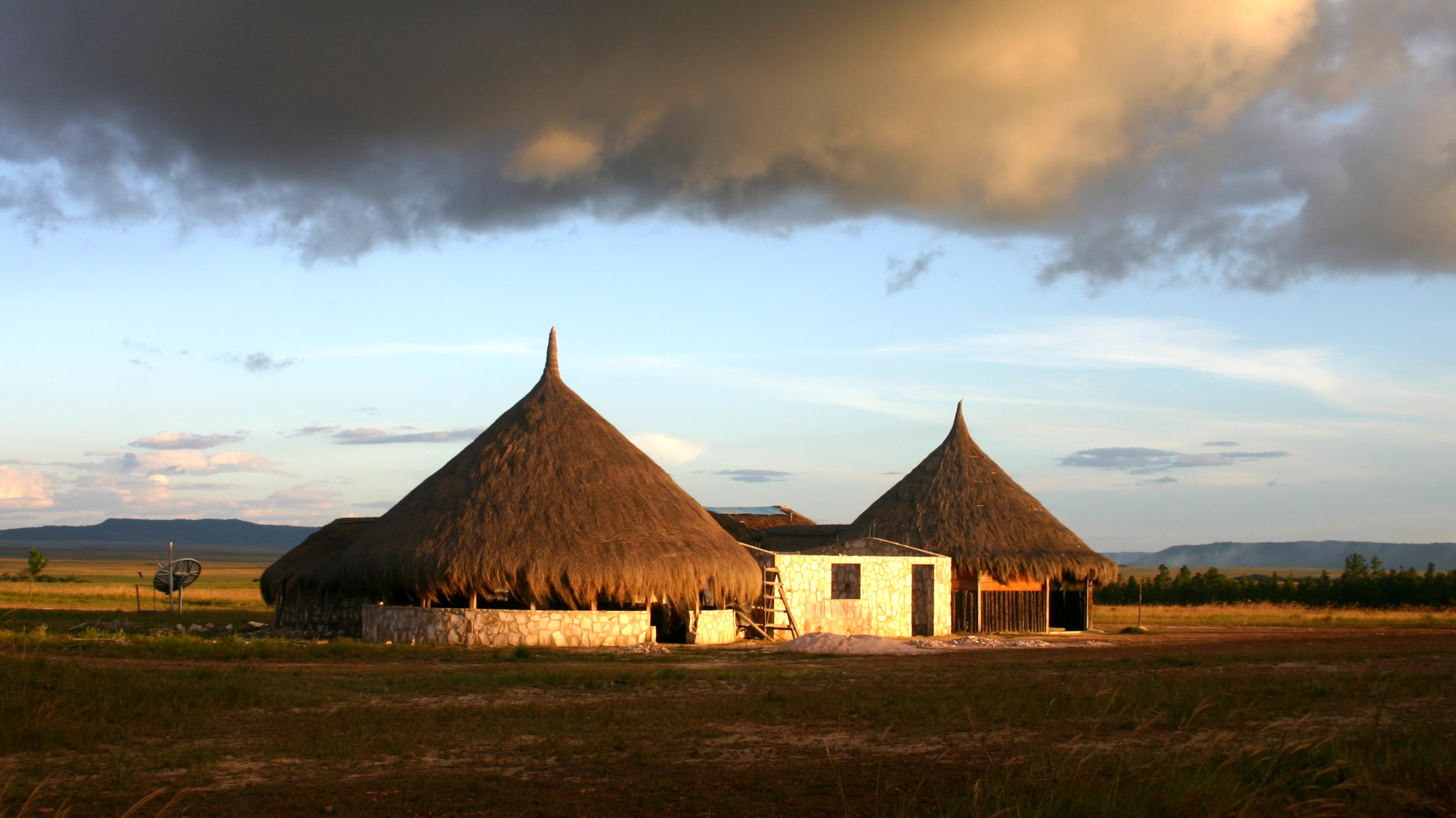
Typical huts in the Gran Sabana

The craftsmanship in the State of Bolivar is mostly referred to basketwork, made with moriche palm. The Indians make objects that are utilitarian and that are very sought after by tourists such as peony seed necklaces, San Pedro tears, toucan peaks, etc...

- Culture Houses:
- Carlos Raúl Villanueva Culture House, (Ciudad Bolívar)
- María Cova Fernández Culture House, (Upata)
- Ciudad Guayana Culture House
- House of Culture Maripa Cultural Complex of Tumeremo

=== Languages ===
Apart from Spanish, which is the main language, several languages are spoken in some sectors of Bolivar.

- Caribbean Family: Pemón, Yekuana, Panare and Akawayo
- Yanomamo family: sanemá
- English: Saint Martin de Turumban

In addition, there are isolated languages such as joti. The Arutani-sapé languages have probably become extinct. According to article 9 of the Constitution of the State of Bolivar of 2001, Spanish is the official language of the State and all the indigenous languages are official for their respective peoples.

=== Folklore ===
In the numerous indigenous cultures of the State of Bolivar, there are musical and artisanal manifestations.

The inhabitants of the jungle use reed flutes and rattles for their spiritual invocations or for joy in moments of collective expansion.

In other environments the joropo is danced, exactly in the northwest of the State, due to the proximity to the plains of Guariqueños and Apureños; the passage, the blows, the tunes to the sound of the harp, maracas and cuatro are characteristic in this area of the State of Bolivar.

Penetrating into the interior, the carnivals in El Callao are very colorful, and they already have fame and tradition with the peculiar Calypso.

The Guiana Calypso originated with the arrival of Antilleans to the State, who brought their customs in their typical English, mixed with ours, giving rise to the Calypso and many other customs. A notable figure of the carnival groups and its main sponsor was the popularly called la Negra Isidora, who gave much importance to this spectacle.

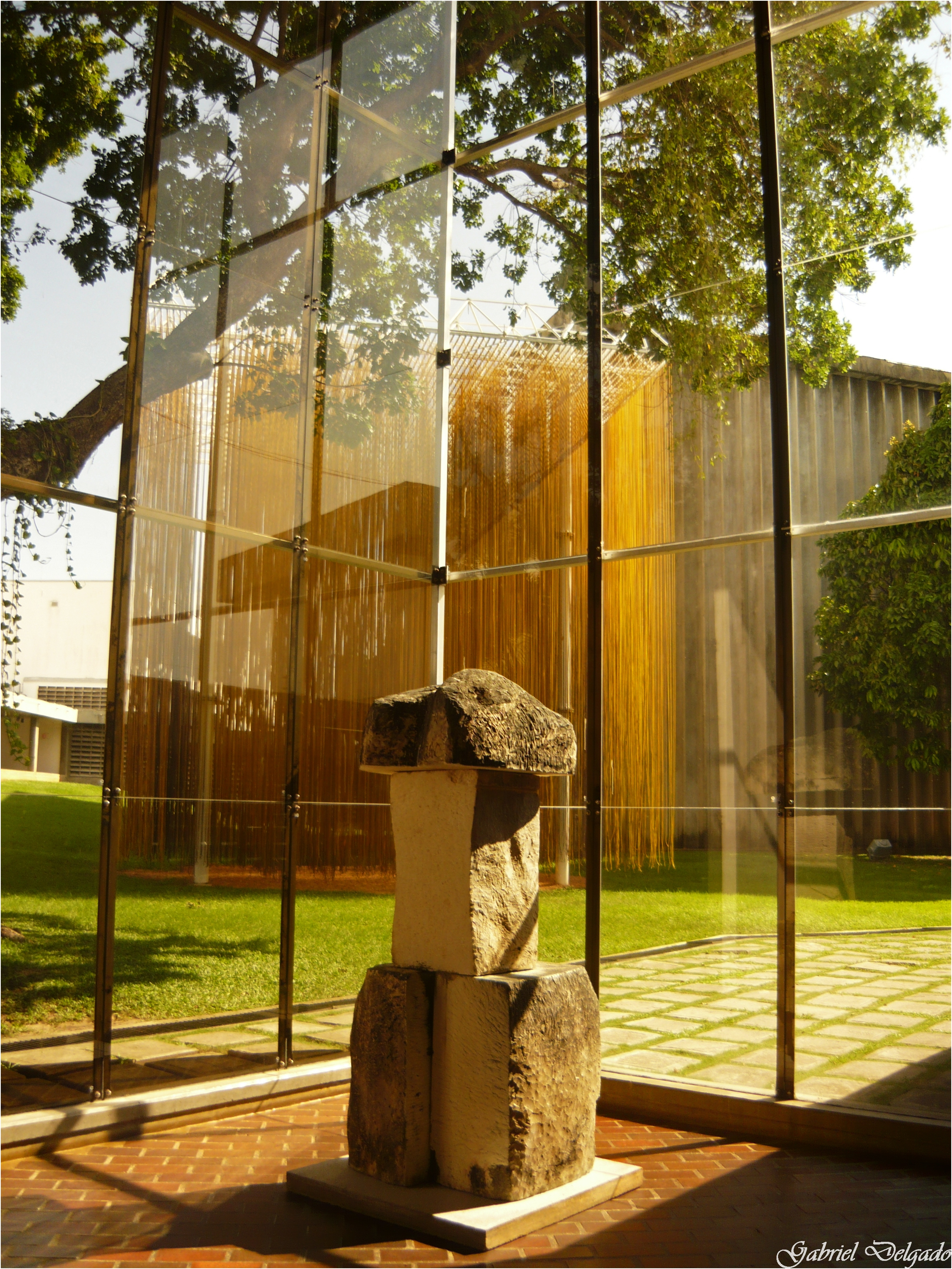
Jesús Soto Museum, Bolívar State

=== Gastronomy ===
The gastronomy of the State of Bolivar is the result of the fusion of several Venezuelan indigenous cultures. It is characterized by the use of yucca, merey, corn and pescaculodo, from which dishes with unique and extraordinary flavors are derived.

The State of Bolivar has a very varied gastronomy using the products of the zone, being the cassava (prepared from the yucca) the main companion of the diverse plates, standing out then the fish of river known as the sapoara and the merey from where diverse candies, nougats, etc. are prepared. There are also varieties of cheese such as: telita, queso de mano and guayanés, among others.

The sapoara, a gastronomic tradition of the State of Bolivar, is a fish that abounds in the vicinity of the Orinoco and Caroní rivers. It is famous in Ciudad Bolivar and in general in all the zones bordering the Orinoco River. This fish is prepared in sancocho, fried, stuffed and roasted. It is defined by specialists as the most characteristic and distinctive fish of Ciudad Bolívar because of its habit of appearing once a year, being one of the few places where it can be fished, in front of the Orinoco promenade in Ciudad Bolívar.

Fishing for the toad takes place exactly in front of the dock where the boats that transport the inhabitants of Ciudad Bolivar and Soledad arrive. Here, the great celebration of the city takes place during the month of August every year, internationally known as "La Feria de la Sapoara".

One of the dishes prepared with the sapoara, is the gilthead, baked, stuffed and the morrocoy cake cut in wheels, in sancocho and the rest remains in the imagination of the housewives or the great chefs of the gastronomic field that abound in the State.

Thus, the recipes of the specialists who have been cooking for years for the demanding national and international palates, suggest that the fish can be prepared fried (dorado), having salt and garlic as main ingredients. If the preference is to eat it baked, do not forget to open it from the back and cover it with salt, applying various condiments such as chopped seasoning (chili, onion, paprika), mustard, etc., and fill it with vegetables and egg and then wrap it in aluminum foil, placing it in the oven until it browns. This dish can be accompanied by yucca, salad and rice or with some potatoes au gratin, all according to the taste of each person.

Sancocho de sapoara, is a traditional dish of the culinary of the State of Bolivar; it is prepared like any soup and you add the vegetables and seasonings you want.

== Sports ==
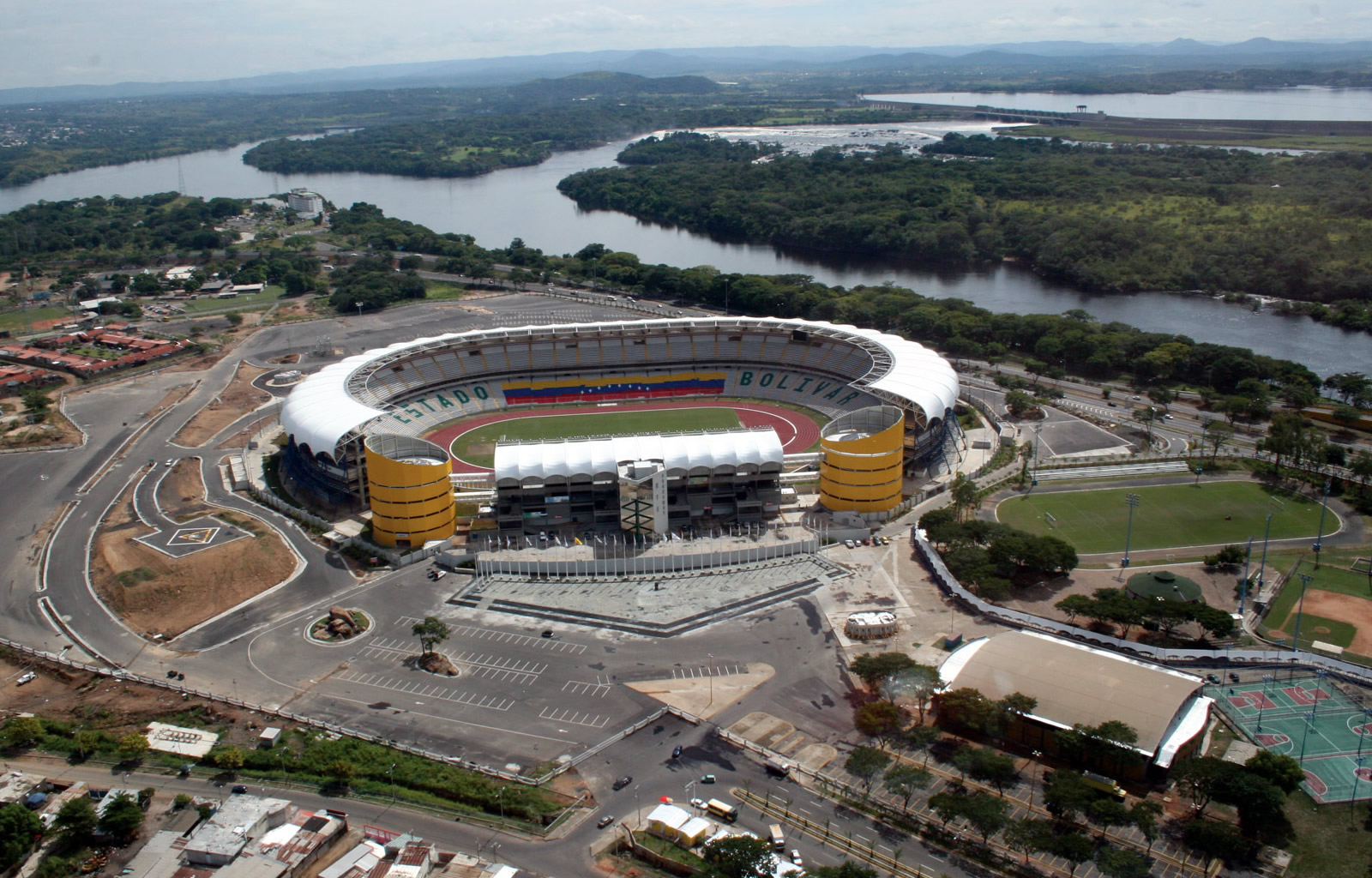
Cachamay Stadium, Ciudad Guayana

The most important football club is Club Deportivo Mineros, which plays in the First Division of Venezuela. Mineros, along with the third division club Minervén Bolívar is based in the Cachamay Stadium in Ciudad Guayana with a capacity for 41 players and 600 spectators. Its rival, Angostura F.C., based in the Ricardo Maya Stadium in Ciudad Bolivar, was promoted to the first division in 2022. Three other clubs: Caroní F.C., Estudiantes de Caroní FC (the oldest club in Venezuela), and Minasoro FC from El Callao, all play in the third division.

Bolívar also has the largest baseball stadium in the country, the Estadio La Ceiba in Ciudad Guayana (Venezuela), recently restored and with a capacity of 30,000 spectators.

The 2007 Copa America, held throughout Venezuela, including the State of Bolivar, some games were played in the re-inaugurated Cachamay Stadium, making it the largest international event held in the State. Several international tournaments of junior categories have also been held and it has hosted several games of the Copa Libertadores, the Copa Conmebol and the Copa Sudamericana.

In 2007, with the expansion of the Venezuelan Professional Basketball League, a franchise was approved in the basketball area, which was initially called Macizos de Guayana and at the beginning of 2008 in its presentation to the press was renamed Gigantes de Guayana, which became the tenth team in the Venezuelan basketball league playing since then in the Hermanas González Gym.

At the end of 2011, the first season of the new Venezuelan Volleyball Super League was held, where the Huracanes de Bolivar team debuted and was the champion of the 2011 season, beating the Industriales de Valencia team in the final. The team dominated the entire season from start to finish, demonstrating its great level and supremacy in Venezuela.

== Transport ==
The access to the State is possible by water, land and air; the entrance from the States of Amazonas, Apure, Guárico, Anzoátegui, Monagas and Delta Amacuro; being the international airports of Ciudad Bolívar and Ciudad Guayana the most important, also has international access. Other airports of national traffic are in La Urbana, Caicara del Orinoco, Upata, Guasipati, La Paragua, El Dorado, Santa Elena de Uairén, Canaima and other smaller ones distributed in the entity.

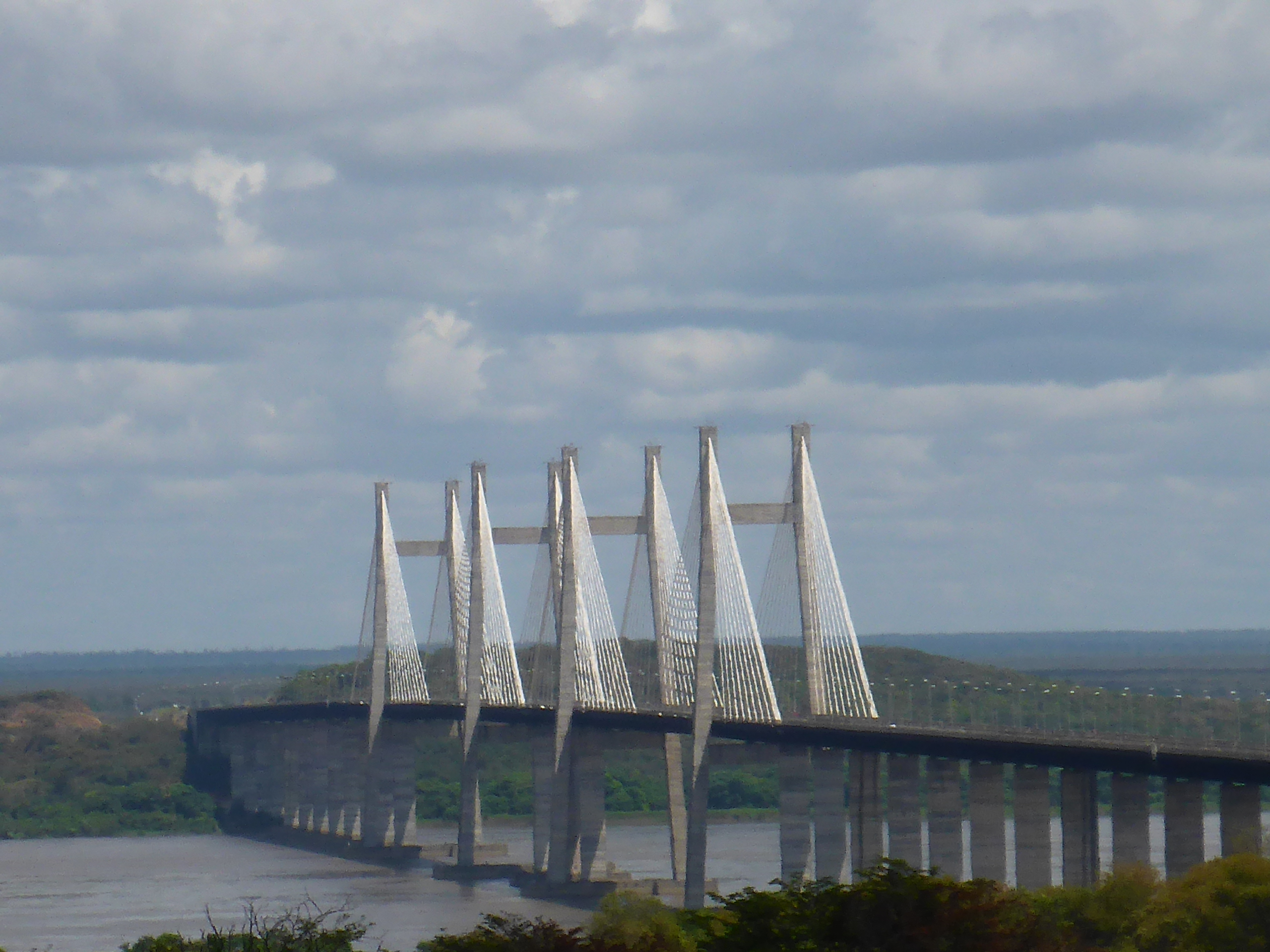
Second Bridge over the Orinoco River, or Orinoquia Bridge, opened in 2006

The main land routes are the North Trunk Highway 19 which, through the Angostura Bridge, crosses the Orinoco River from the State of Anzoátegui Municipality of Independencia, Soledad to Ciudad Bolívar and continues to Ciudad Guayana; and the Highway that, through the Orinoquia Bridge, crosses the Orinoco and joins Trunk Highway 19 very close to Ciudad Guayana. From here the Trunk 10 starts via Upata, Guasipati, El Callao, Tumeremo, El Dorado, La Escalera – Gran Saba – km 88, until Santa Elena de Uairen, crosses the border with Brazil, reaches the Line to continue to Boa Vista and Manaos Brazil. Other routes communicate with the State of Amazonas to the west.

The waterways are mainly on the Orinoco, in fishing boats among others, but there are also trips on certain rivers of the state, such as the Caura and the Caroní.

== Dams ==
=== Tocoma Dam ===
The Tocoma Dam officially known as the Manuel Piar Hydroelectric Plant is a Venezuelan hydroelectric plant located on the lower Caroni River in the state of Bolivar. It is under construction and is the latest hydroelectric development project in the lower Caroní basin. The project includes the installation of 2,300 MW to generate an average annual energy of 12,100 GWh. Ten Kaplan generating units of 230 MW, manufactured by the Argentine company IMPSA, are expected to start operations between 2012 and 2014.

=== Caruachi Dam ===
The Caruachi Dam is a water reservoir located more than 60 kilometers downstream of the Guri Reservoir, and 25 kilometers upstream of the Macagua Reservoir in Venezuela. It was inaugurated in 2006, and covers an area of 250 km^{2}. It provides 12% of the national electricity demand. It is also known as the Francisco de Miranda Hydroelectric Power Plant.

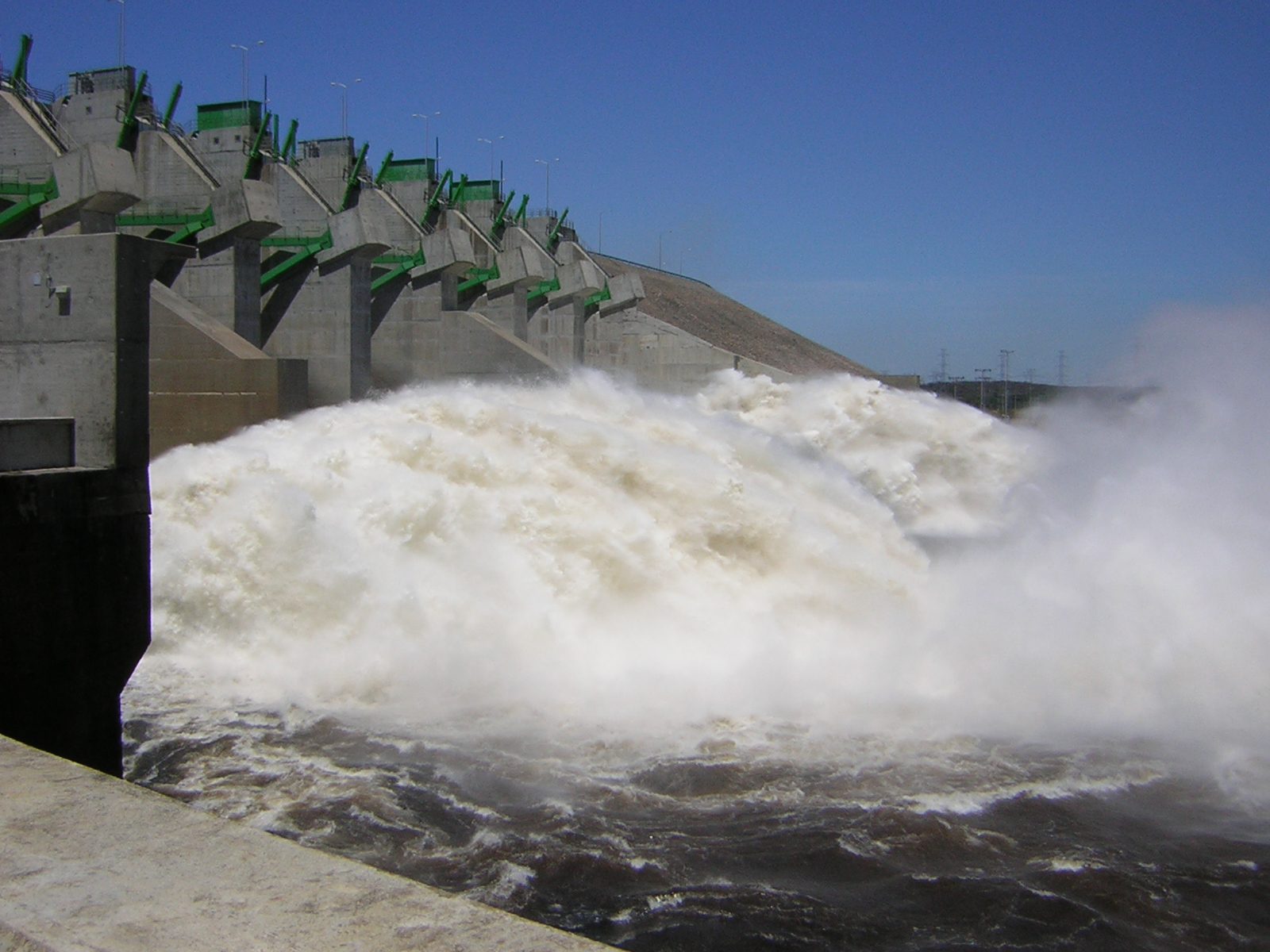
Caruachi Dam in Bolívar State, Venezuela

CVG Edelca, in view of the high environmental impact caused by the construction of the third hydroelectric dam in the Caroní, worked together with the Ministry of the Environment to rescue the flora, fauna and valuable archeological treasures found in the region, which are now permanently exhibited in the Caroní Ecomuseum.

The 12 generators in the engine room of the Caruachi Dam are covered with reproductions of baskets of the Yekuana ethnic group. Each turbine represents the myths of the tribe covering a space of 16 meters in diameter to cover the entire turbine. While the walls display large reproductions of 13 indigenous petroglyphs from different regions of Guyana and Venezuela.

=== Macagua Dam ===
The Macagua Dam, also known as the Antonio Jose de Sucre Hydroelectric Plant, is part of the Bolivar State Electricity Generating Park. It consists of three stages: Macagua I, which has 6 small units; Macagua II, which has 12 units; and the newer Macagua III, which has 2 units. The complex generates 2190 MW. It has a length of 322 m., and has 12 radial gates of 22 m. wide and 15.6 m. high.

It can be admired leaving Puerto Ordaz, towards San Felix. In its interior is located the Plaza del Agua and the Caroní Ecomuseum. One of the greatest attractions of the place is a bridge that stands on the spillway, through which visitors can drive.

== See also ==
- States of Venezuela
