= Cedeño Municipality =

Cedeño Municipality may refer to:

- Cedeño Municipality, Bolívar
- Cedeño Municipality, Monagas
