= Angostura Municipality =

Angostura Municipality may refer to:

- Angostura Municipality, Sinaloa, Mexico
- Angostura Municipality, Venezuela
