= Caicara del Orinoco =

Town in Bolivar State, Venezuela

- Town
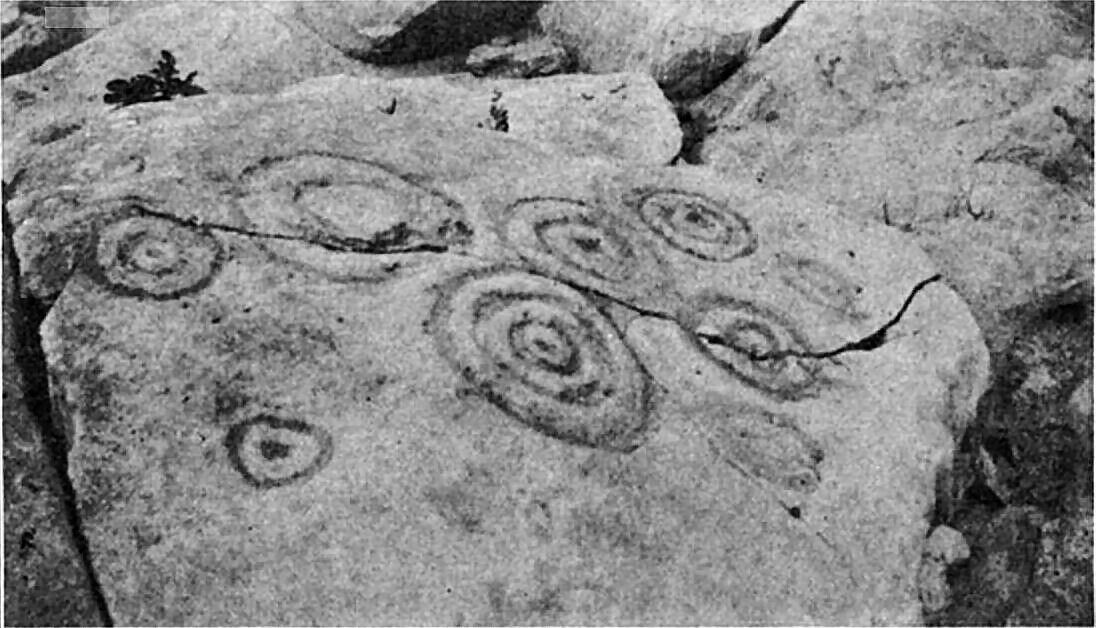
- Petroglyphs near Caicara

- Location within Venezuela
- Coordinates: 7°39′N 66°10′W
- Country: Venezuela
- State: Bolívar State
- Municipality: Cedeño Municipality

Area
  - Total: 38 km^{2} (15 sq mi)
  - Water: 0.16 km^{2} (0.062 sq mi)
- Time zone: UTC−4 (VET)

Caicara del Orinoco is a town in, and the administrative seat of, Cedeño Municipality, Bolívar State, Venezuela.

Currently the Venezuelan government is building a bridge across the Orinoco at Caicara. When completed the bridge will be 2.4 km long.

== Prehistory ==
Alexander von Humboldt discovered petroglyphs carved in the granite and gneiss near the river at Caicara. Further investigation revealed a large number of prehistoric petroglyphs in the area.

== History ==
It was founded in the middle of the eighteenth century.

== Politics ==
The Mayor of Caicara del Orinoco is Rafael Gutiérrez, a member of the United Socialist Party of Venezuela

== See also ==
- List of cities and towns in Venezuela
