= Padre Pedro Chien Municipality =

Padre Pedro Chien Municipality Municipio Padre Pedro Chien
- Municipality
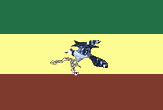
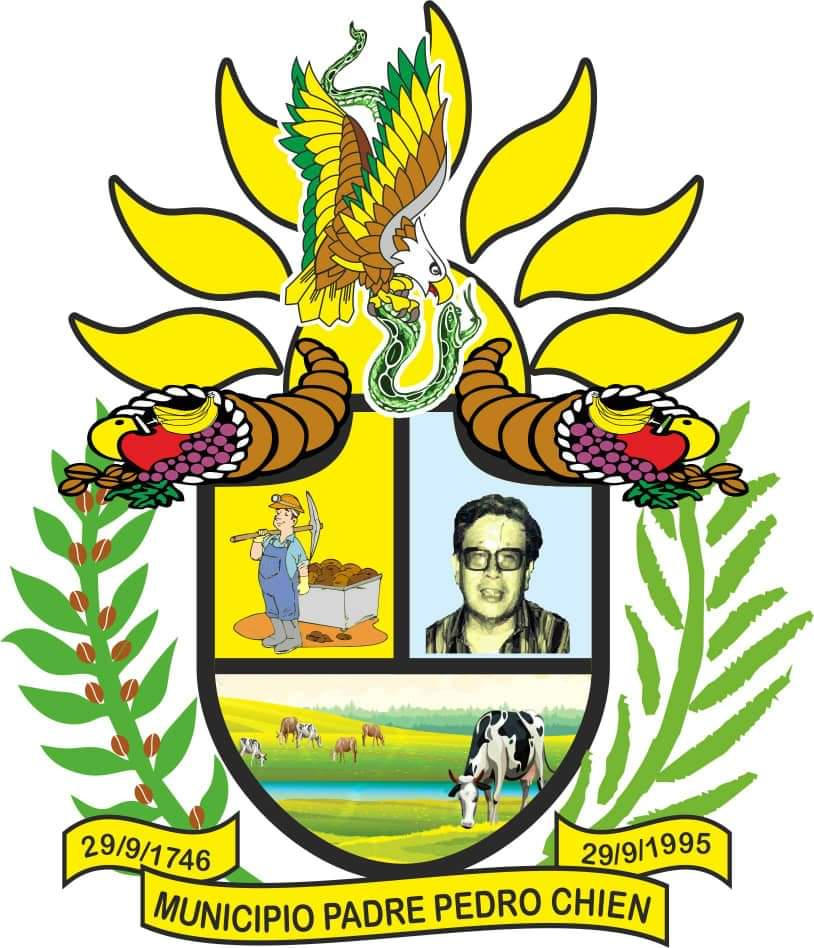
- Flag Coat of arms

- Location in Bolívar

- Location in Venezuela
- Coordinates: 8°01′50″N 61°57′40″W
- Country: Venezuela
- State: Bolívar
- Municipal seat: El Palmar

Government
  - Mayor: Benny Ramos Romero (PSUV)

Area
  - Total: 3,695.5 km^{2} (1,426.8 sq mi)

Population (2011)
  - Total: 15,488
  - Density: 4.1910/km^{2} (10.855/sq mi)
- Time zone: UTC−4 (VET)
- Area code(s): 0288
- Website: Official website

The Padre Pedro Chien Municipality is one of the 11 municipalities (municipios) that makes up the Venezuelan state of Bolívar and, according to the 2011 census by the National Institute of Statistics of Venezuela, the municipality has a population of 15,488. The town of El Palmar is the shire town of the Padre Pedro Chien Municipality.

== Demographics ==
The Padre Pedro Chien Municipality, according to a 2007 population estimate by the National Institute of Statistics of Venezuela, has a population of 14,749 (up from 12,810 in 2000). This amounts to 1% of the state's population. The municipality's population density is 6.48 inhabitants per square kilometre (16.8/sq mi).

== Government ==
The mayor of the Padre Pedro Chien Municipality is Franklin Gonzalez, re-elected on October 31, 2004, with 76% of the vote. The municipality is divided into one parish (Capital Padre Pedro Chien).

== See also ==
- El Palmar
- Bolívar
- Municipalities of Venezuela
