= Flag of Bolívar State =

Flag of the state of Bolívar of Venezuela

The flag of Bolívar State was designed by cinetic artist Jesús Soto. It is composed by three colors: the yellow field, representing the riches of the state. Over the yellow field, a green circle, representing the abundant vegetation and three blue fesses separated from each other to represent the rivers that cross the Bolívar State.

In the central blue fess, eight white five-pointed stars, located horizontally. Seven of them represent the seven provinces that together declared the Venezuelan independence and the eight that constitutes the emblem of the Guayana Province.

In the first canton (up and left) the coat of arms of the Bolivar State will be located.

Flag adoption at 1930 and edited in 2006.

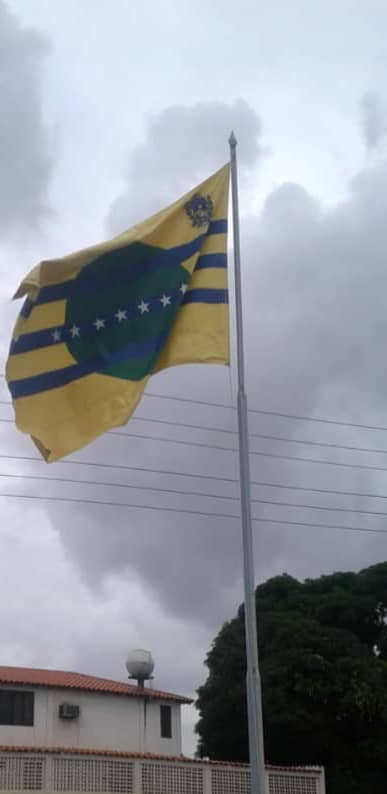
Flag of Bolívar State
