= El Palmar, Bolívar =

El Palmar
- Town
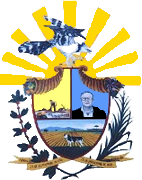
- Coat of arms

- Location in Venezuela
- Coordinates: 8°1′28″N 61°52′55″W
- Country: Venezuela
- State: Bolívar
- Municipality: Padre Pedro Chien

Population (2011)
  - Total: 15,521
- Time zone: UTC−4 (VET)

El Palmar is a town in the state of Bolívar in eastern Venezuela. It is the shire town of the Padre Pedro Chien Municipality.
