= Angostura Municipality, Bolívar =

Angostura Municipality Municipio Angostura
- Municipality
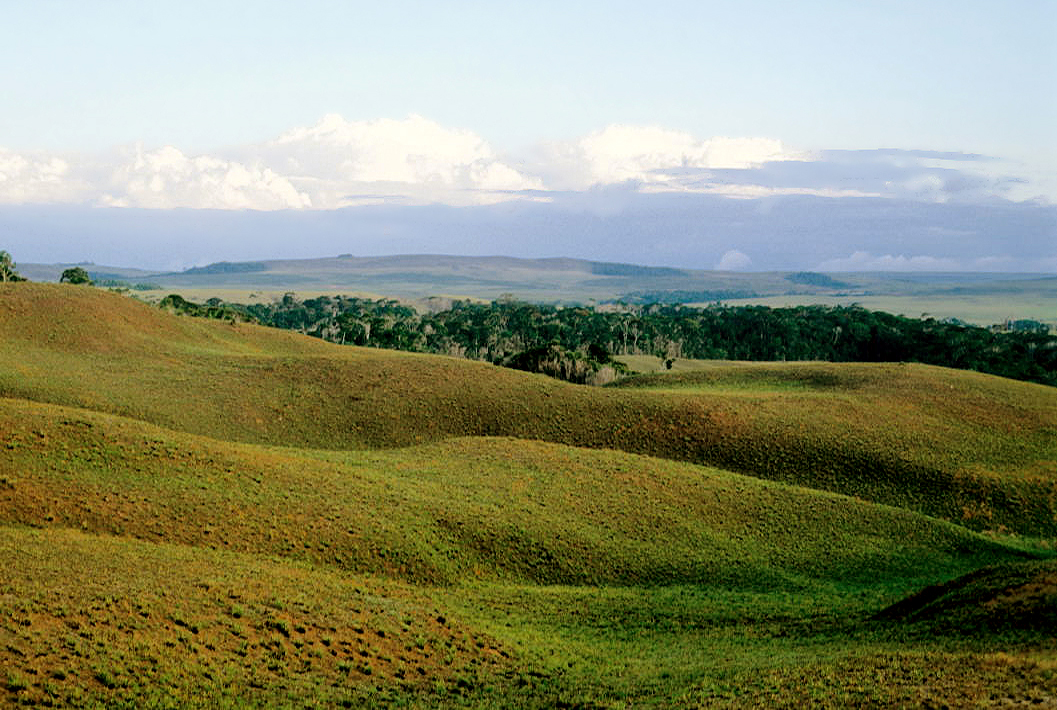

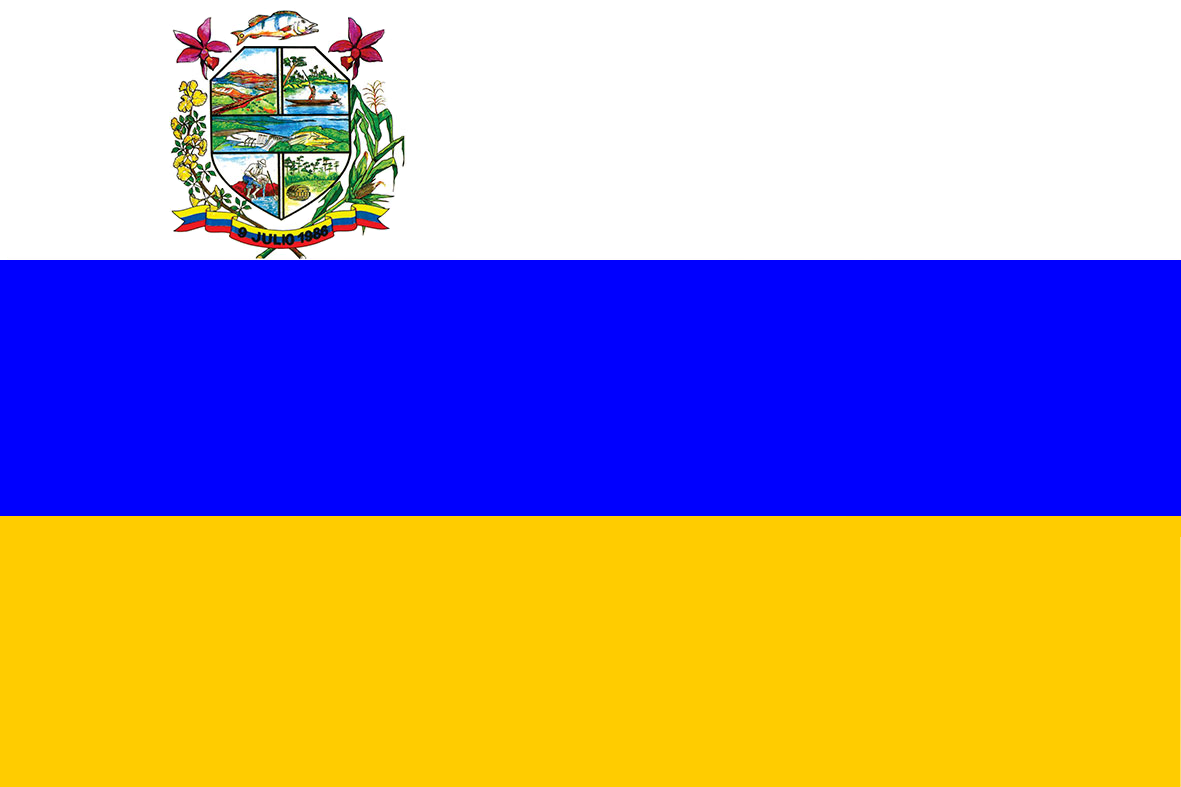
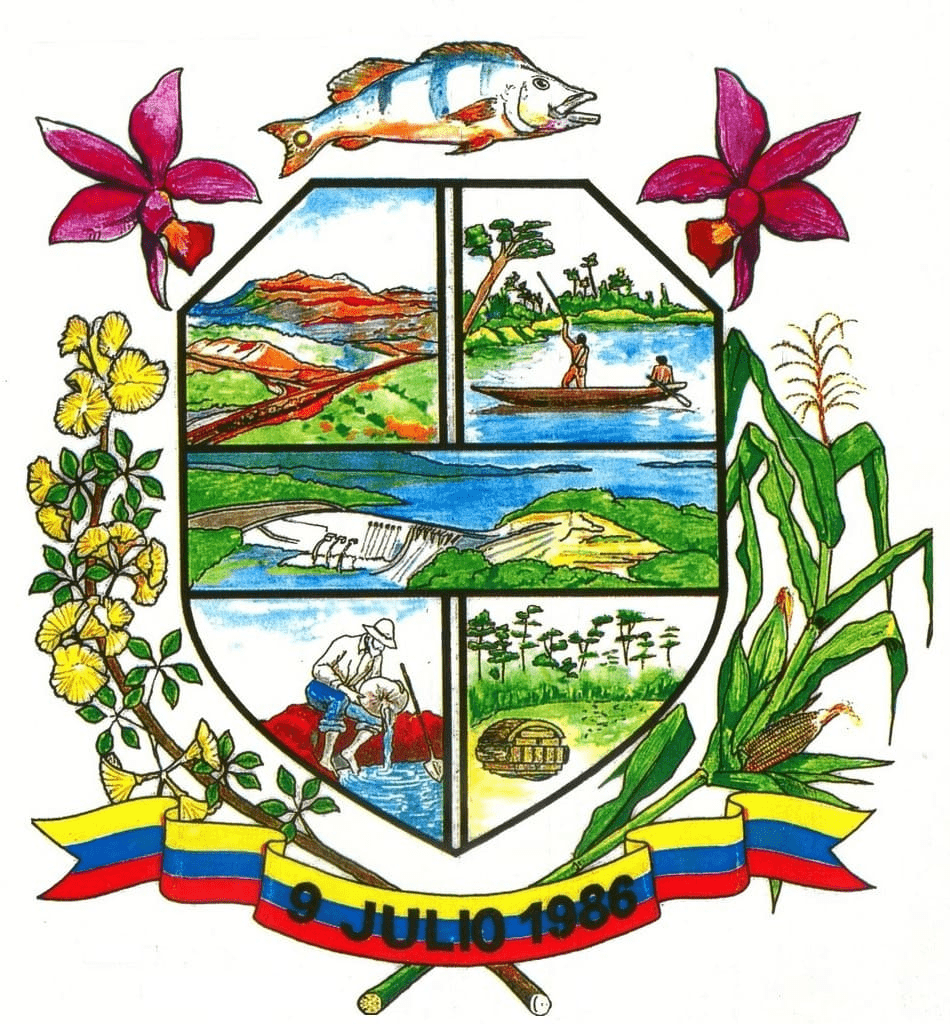
- Flag Coat of arms

- Location in Bolívar

- Location in Venezuela
- Coordinates: 5°48′01″N 63°08′55″W
- Country: Venezuela
- State: Bolívar
- Municipal seat: Ciudad Piar

Government
  - Mayor: Nayroby Abreu Botas (PSUV) ((PSUV))

Area
  - Total: 57,337.2 km^{2} (22,138.0 sq mi)

Population (2011)
  - Total: 40,927
  - Density: 0.71379/km^{2} (1.8487/sq mi)
- Time zone: UTC−4 (VET)
- Area code(s): 0285

Angostura Municipality (also Bolivariano Angostura, prior to June 2009 called Raúl Leoni Municipality) is one of the eleven municipalities (municipios) that makes up the Venezuelan state of Bolívar and, according to the 2011 census by the National Institute of Statistics of Venezuela, the municipality has a population of 40,927. The town of Ciudad Piar is the administrative seat of Angostura Municipality. The municipality was formerly named for the Venezuelan president Raúl Leoni, who served 1964 to 1969.

== Demographics ==
Angostura Municipality, according to a 2007 population estimate by the National Institute of Statistics of Venezuela, had a population of 47,167 (up from 36,654 in 2000). This amounts to 3.1% of the state's population. The municipality's population density is 0.83 inhabitants per square kilometre (2.1/sq mi).

== Government ==
The municipality is divided into four parishes; Barceloneta, San Francisco, Santa Bárbara and Cm. Ciudad Piar. The mayor of Angostura Municipality (then Raúl Leoni Municipality) was Gilberto Antonio Villarroel Carvajal, re-elected on October 31, 2004, with 52% of the vote. The municipality is divided into four parishes; Barceloneta, San Francisco, Santa Bárbara and Angostura. In 2006 he was replaced as mayor by Gilberto Villarroel, and in 2013 Yusleiby Ramírez was elected mayor by narrowly beating Gilberto Villarroel in the election.
