= Cerro Bolívar =

Mine in Venezuela

Coordinates: 7°30′N 63°24′W

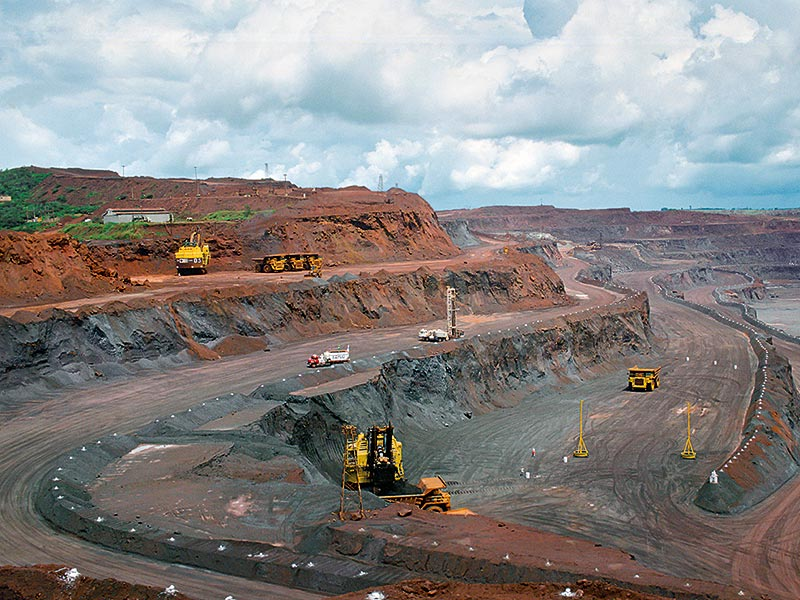
Pictured in May 2021

Cerro Bolívar is a mountain in the state of Bolívar, Venezuela, about 600 metres high. It has been described as "the richest concentration of iron ore on the face of the earth." At the time of its discovery it promised to outdo the great Hull-Rust-Mahoning mine in Hibbing, Minnesota, USA. More than half the mountain is thought to consist of top-grade iron ore – anything up to half a billion tons.

Cerro Bolivar has been mined since the 1950s, originally by U.S. Steel. In 1975, the mining operation was nationalized by the government of president Carlos Andrés Pérez. Mining stopped in 1997, but resumed again in 2009 when the Swiss company Commodities and Minerals Ltd took over operations on invitation by president Hugo Chávez.
