= Cedeño Municipality, Bolívar =

Cedeño Municipality Municipio Cedeño
- Municipality
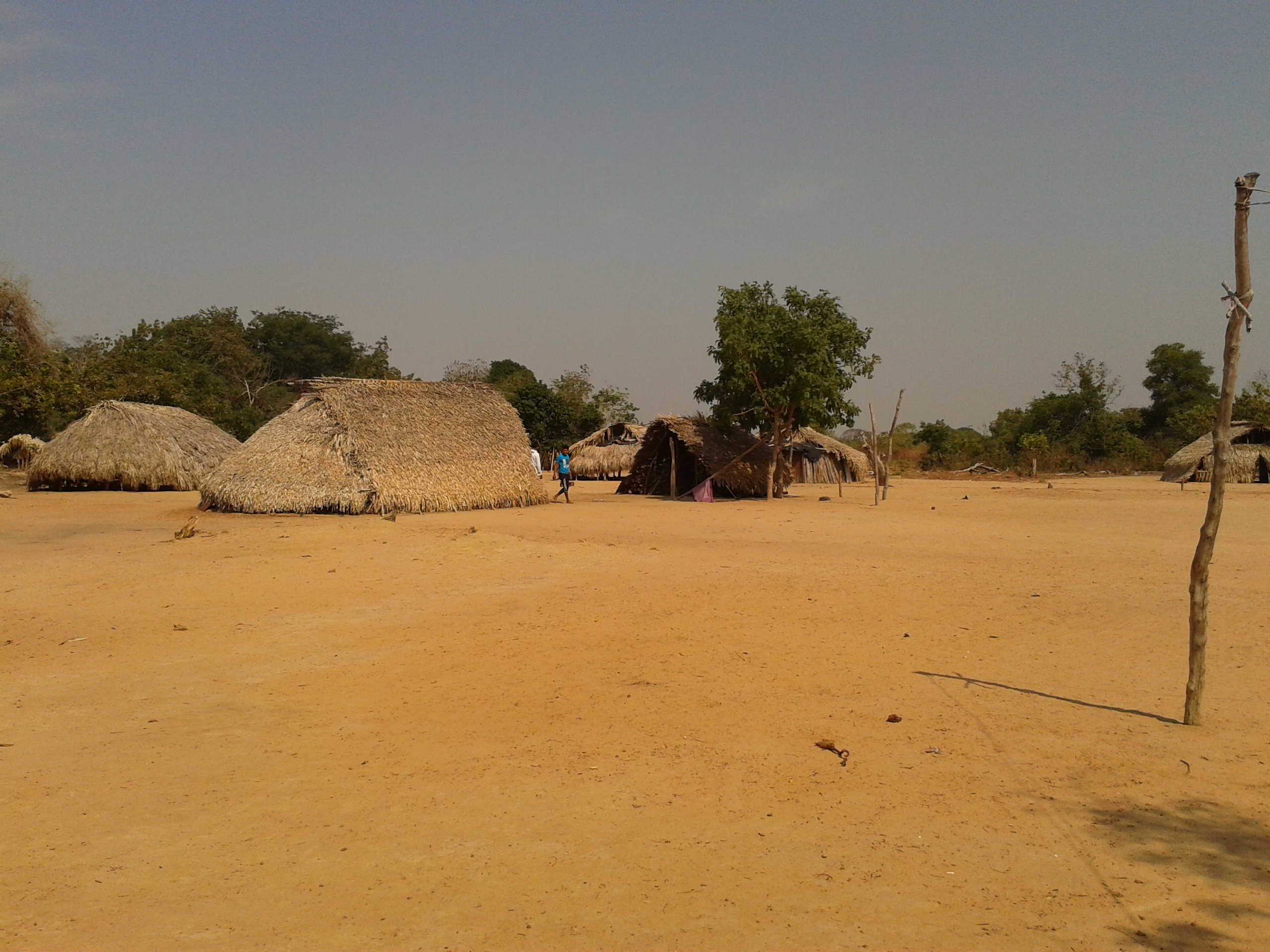

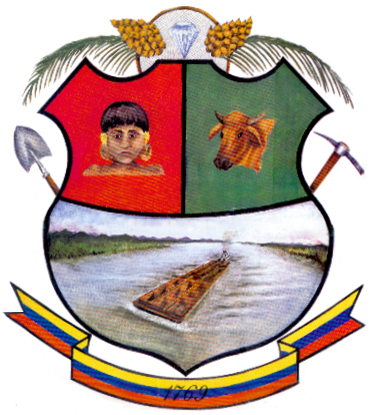
- Flag Coat of arms

- Location in Bolívar

- Location in Venezuela
- Coordinates: 6°42′36″N 66°06′46″W
- Country: Venezuela
- State: Bolívar
- Municipal seat: Caicara del Orinoco

Government
  - Mayor: Julio Cedeño Pérez (PSUV) ((PSUV))

Area
  - Total: 49,256.0 km^{2} (19,017.8 sq mi)

Population (2011)
  - Total: 67,000
  - Density: 1.4/km^{2} (3.5/sq mi)
- Time zone: UTC−4 (VET)
- Area code(s): 0284
- Website: Official website

The Cedeño Municipality is one of the 11 municipalities (municipios) that makes up the Venezuelan state of Bolívar. According to the 2011 census by the National Institute of Statistics of Venezuela, the municipality has a population of 67,000. The town of Caicara del Orinoco is the municipal seat of the Cedeño Municipality.

== Demographics ==
The Cedeño Municipality, according to a 2007 population estimate by the National Institute of Statistics of Venezuela, has a population of 88,296 (up from 69,664 in 2000). This amounts to 5.8% of the state's population. The municipality's population density is 1.92 inhabitants per square kilometre (5.0/sq mi).

== Government ==
The mayor of the Cedeño Municipality is Luis Guillermo Troconiz Marquez, elected on October 31, 2004, with 25% of the vote. He replaced Ismael Ortuño shortly after the elections. The municipality is divided into five (six if you count the Capital Cedeño section) parishes; Altagracia, Ascensión Farreras, Guaniamo, La Urbana, and Pijiguaos.

== See also ==
- Caicara del Orinoco
- Bolívar
- Municipalities of Venezuela
