= Guri Reservoir =

Venezuelan body of water

- Embalse de Guri (Spanish)
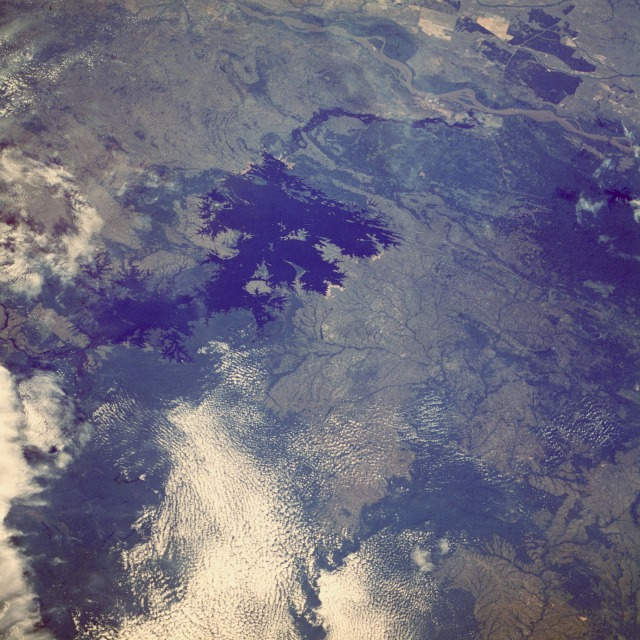
- The Caroní River and the Guri Reservoir (Venezuela).

- Location within Venezuela
- Location: Venezuela
- Coordinates: 7.46°N 62.82°W
- Type: reservoir
- River sources: Caroní River
- Managing agency: CVG Edelca
- Built: 1975
- First flooded: 1980
- Max. length: 109.74 kilometres (68.19 mi)
- Max. width: 58 kilometres (36 mi)
- Surface area: 3,673.7 square kilometres (1,418.4 sq mi)
- Surface elevation: 270 metres (890 ft)

The Guri reservoir is the largest reservoir in Venezuela. It has a surface area of 4250 km^{2}. The Reservoir is created by the Guri Dam.
