= Phanaeus =

Phanaeus may refer to:

- Phanaeus (beetle), a genus of beetles
- Phanaeus (epithet), one of several epithets for the Greek god Apollo
