= Sternaspis =

Sternaspis may refer to:

- Sternaspis (annelid), a genus of polychaetes in the family Sternaspidae
- Sternaspis, a genus of worms in the family Aspidosiphonidae, synonym of Aspidosiphon
- Sternaspis, a genus of beetles in the family Scarabaeidae, synonym of Oxysternon
