= Sifontes Municipality =

Sifontes Municipality Municipio Sifontes
- Municipality
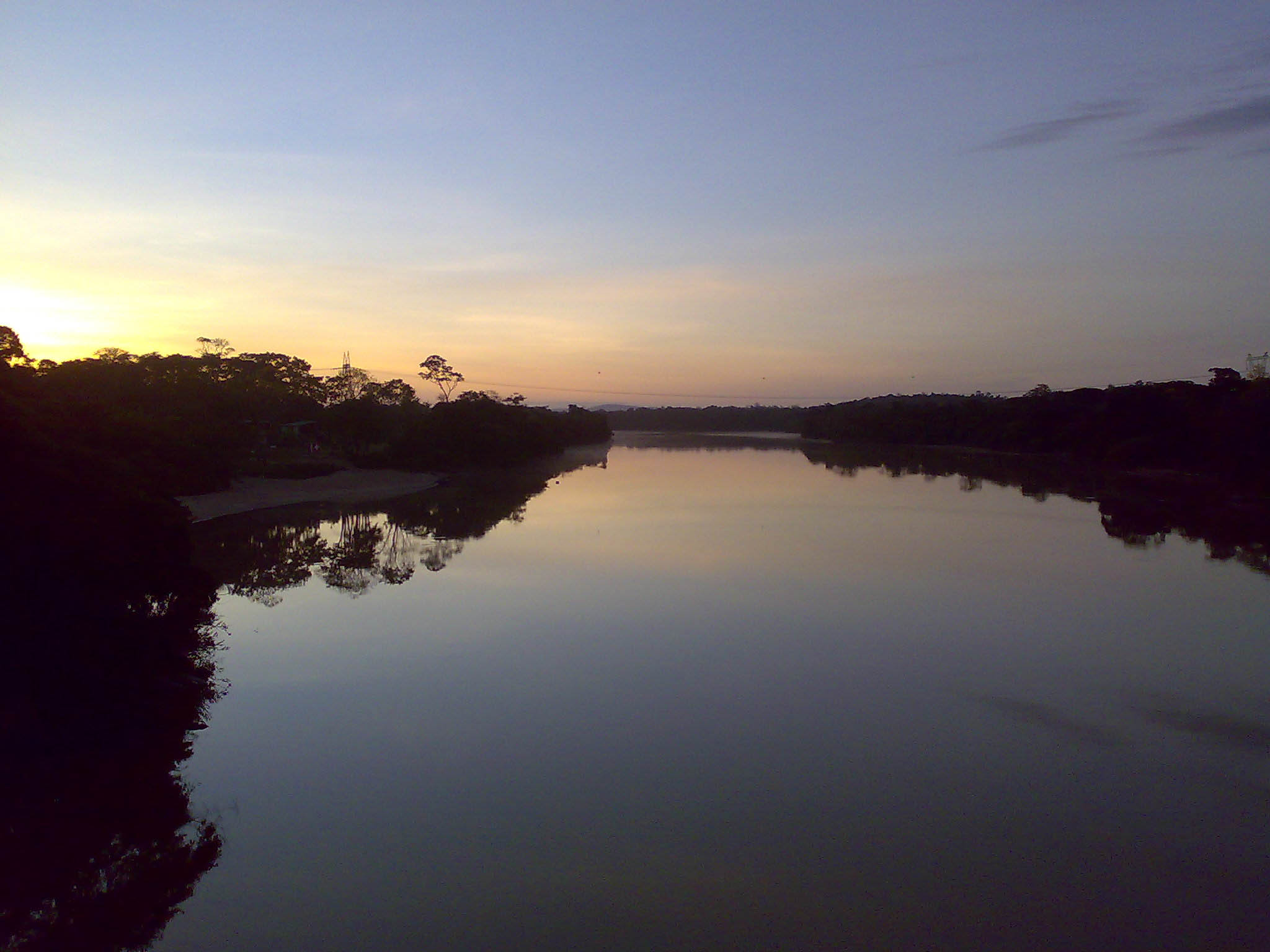

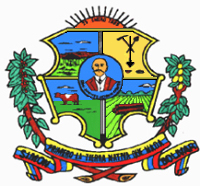
- Flag Coat of arms

- Location in Bolívar

- Location in Venezuela
- Coordinates: 6°58′01″N 61°35′26″W
- Country: Venezuela
- State: Bolívar
- Municipal seat: Tumeremo

Government
  - Mayor: Juan Rojas Medina (PSUV)

Area
  - Total: 27,382.2 km^{2} (10,572.3 sq mi)

Population (2011)
  - Total: 50,082
  - Density: 1.8290/km^{2} (4.7371/sq mi)
- Time zone: UTC−4 (VET)
- Area code(s): 0288
- Website: Official website

The Sifontes Municipality is one of the 11 municipalities (municipios) that makes up the Venezuelan state of Bolívar and, according to the 2011 census by the National Institute of Statistics of Venezuela, the municipality has a population of 50,082. The town of Tumeremo was the shire town of the Sifontes Municipality.

== Demographics ==
The Sifontes Municipality, according to a 2007 population estimate by the National Institute of Statistics of Venezuela, has a population of 40,042 (up from 34,277 in 2000). This amounts to 2.6% of the state's population. The municipality's population density is 1.64 inhabitants per square kilometre (4.2/sq mi).

== Government ==
The mayor of the Sifontes Municipality is Carlos Chancellor, elected on December 8, 2013, with 50,23% of the vote. He replaced Marlene Vargas shortly after the elections. The municipality is divided into two (three if the Capital Tumeremo section is counted) parishes; Dalla Costa and San Isidro.

== History ==
Its first settlers were Guayan Indians and Kamaracotos, coming from the savanna of the Divina Pastora and Tupuquen located to the left margin of the river Yuruari. They fed on hunting, fishing and agriculture. Tumeremo was founded on January 26, 1788 under the name of "Mission of Our Lady of Bethlehem of Tumeremo" by the Capuchin monks of Catalonia, among them: Fray Mariano de Perafita, Fray Bonaventura de Carrocera and Fray Tomas de Santa Eugenia. Tumeremo means "Painted Snake", in the dialect of the first Indians who inhabited these lands.

During the Campaign of Guayana, General Manuel Piar fights against the realists to seize the missions of the kingdom of Spain. After releasing Tumeremo, the Spanish survivors were imprisoned and sentenced to death. From there, the city was a strategic site and barracks for the patriot soldiers commanded by Simón Bolívar. From 1830 many indigenous and other populations began to emerge around Tumeremo.

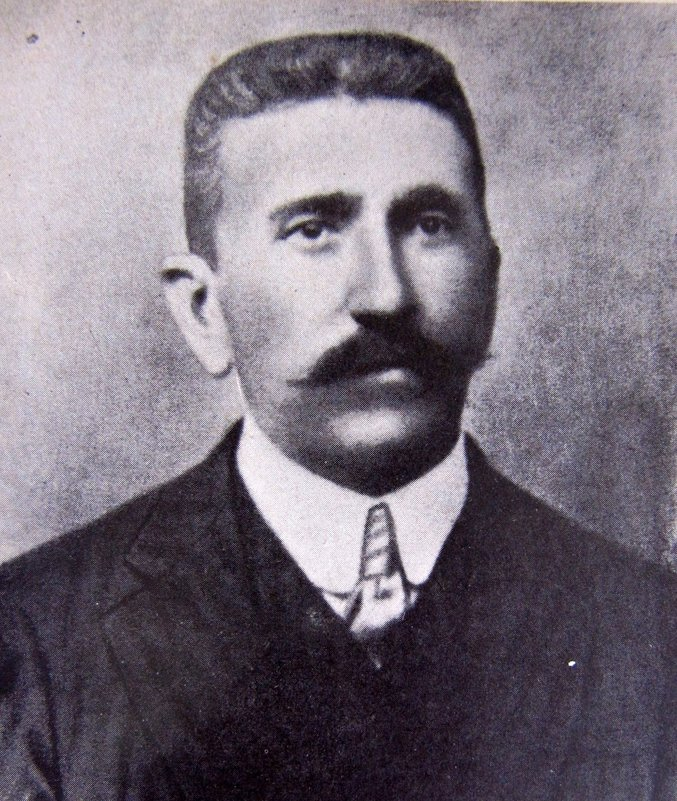
General Domingo Sinfontes

In 1894, a group of British settlers who came from the British Guyana tried to take part of the present municipal territory, before which General Domingo Antonio Sifontes founded in March 2nd of the same year the population of El Dorado in which it established a military position, then expelled the settlers from the area. General Sifontes became a local hero in recognition of the defense of Venezuelan sovereignty. The name of the municipality takes its name in honor to the general Antonio Domingo Sifontes, but the jurisdiction abbreviated its name li

In 2013, 60% of all malaria cases in Venezuela occurred in Sifontes.

== Fauna, flora and vegetation ==
The municipality of Sifontes lies in the Guianan Highlands moist forests ecoregion, and the major habitat type is tropical and subtropical moist broadleaf forests.

Common birds include the Orange-winged Parrot (Amazona amazonica), Painted Parakeet (Pyrrhura picta), White Bellbird (Procnias alba), Helmeted Pygmy-Tyrant (Lophotriccus galeatus), Fiery-shouldered Parakeet (Pyrrhura egregia), Blue-headed Parrot (Pionus menstruus). At least 58 species of dung beetles and 73 of butterflies have been reported in systematic surveys. Among the most common species of dung beetles are Canthon triangularis, Canthon variabilis, Deltochilum guildingii, Eurysternus caribaeus, Onthophagus rubrescens, Sylvicanthon bridarollii, and the emblematic Oxysternon festivum.

== See also ==
- El Bochinche
- Tumeremo
- Bolívar
- Municipalities of Venezuela
