= Phanaeus bispinus =

Scientific classification
- Kingdom: Animalia
- Phylum: Arthropoda
- Clade: Pancrustacea
- Class: Insecta
- Order: Coleoptera
- Suborder: Polyphaga
- Infraorder: Scarabaeiformia
- Family: Scarabaeidae
- Genus: Phanaeus
- Species: P. bispinus

Binomial name
- Phanaeus bispinus Bates, 1868

Synonyms
- Phanaeus digitalis Olsoufieff, 1924

Species of beetle

Phanaeus bispinus is a species of beetle of the family Scarabaeidae. It is found in Bolivia, Brazil (Acre, Mato Grosso, Pará, Rondônia, Roraima), Colombia, Ecuador, French Guiana, Guyana, Peru and Venezuela.
