= Phanaeus changdiazi =

Scientific classification
- Kingdom: Animalia
- Phylum: Arthropoda
- Class: Insecta
- Order: Coleoptera
- Suborder: Polyphaga
- Infraorder: Scarabaeiformia
- Family: Scarabaeidae
- Genus: Phanaeus
- Species: P. changdiazi

Binomial name
- Phanaeus changdiazi Kohlmann & Solis, 2001

Species of beetle

Phanaeus changdiazi is a species of beetle found in Panama and Costa Rica. It is named after Franklin Chang-Díaz, a Costa Rican-American physicist and former NASA astronaut.
