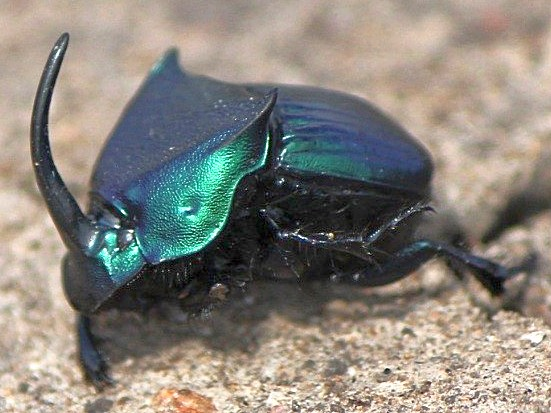
- male

Scientific classification
- Domain: Eukaryota
- Kingdom: Animalia
- Phylum: Arthropoda
- Class: Insecta
- Order: Coleoptera
- Suborder: Polyphaga
- Infraorder: Scarabaeiformia
- Family: Scarabaeidae
- Genus: Phanaeus
- Species: P. adonis

Binomial name
- Phanaeus adonis HAROLD, 1863

= Phanaeus adonis =

Species of beetle

Phanaeus adonis is a species of true dung beetle in the family Scarabaeidae, found primarily in north-central Mexico, but also ranging into Cameron County in far southern Texas, United States.
