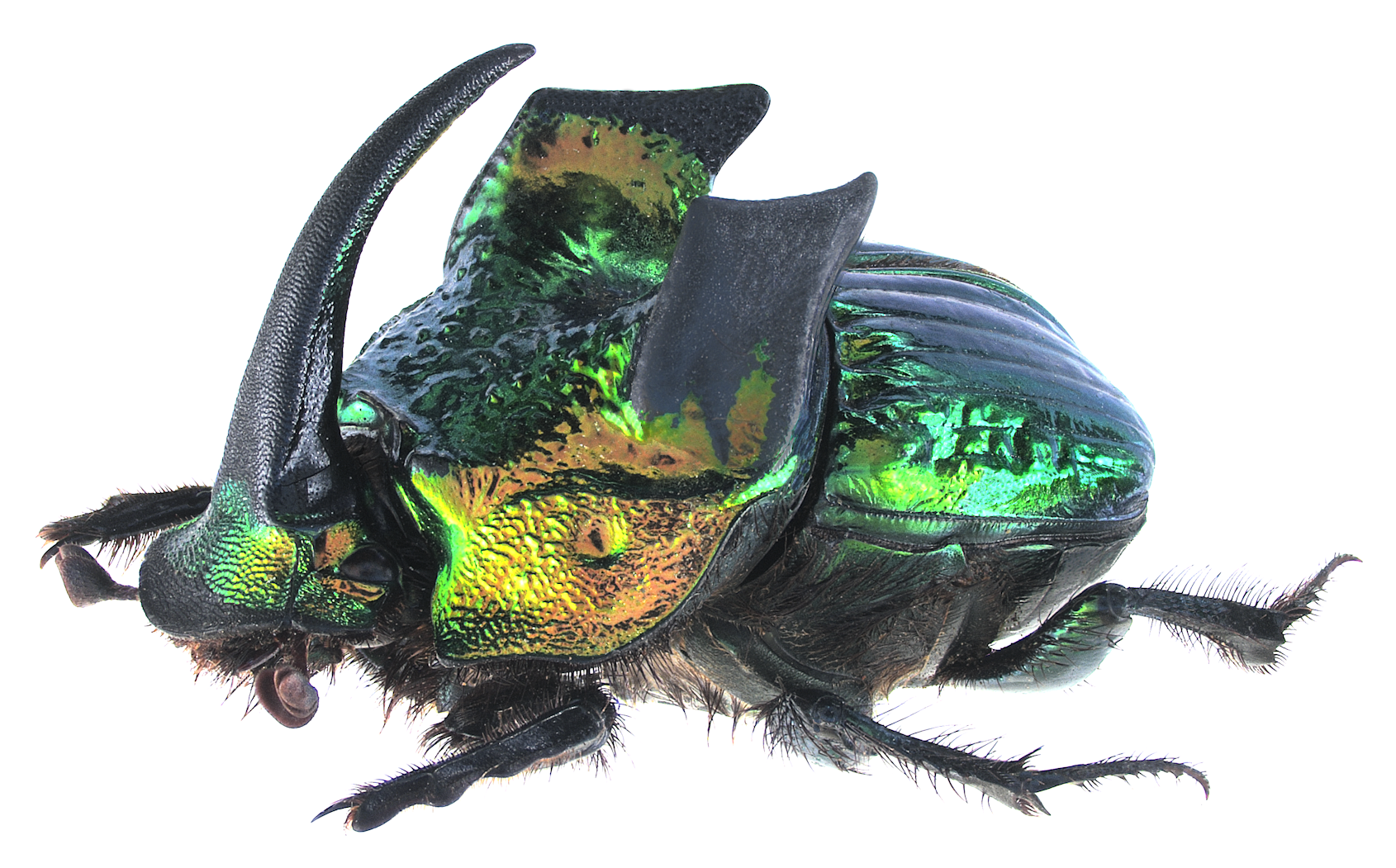

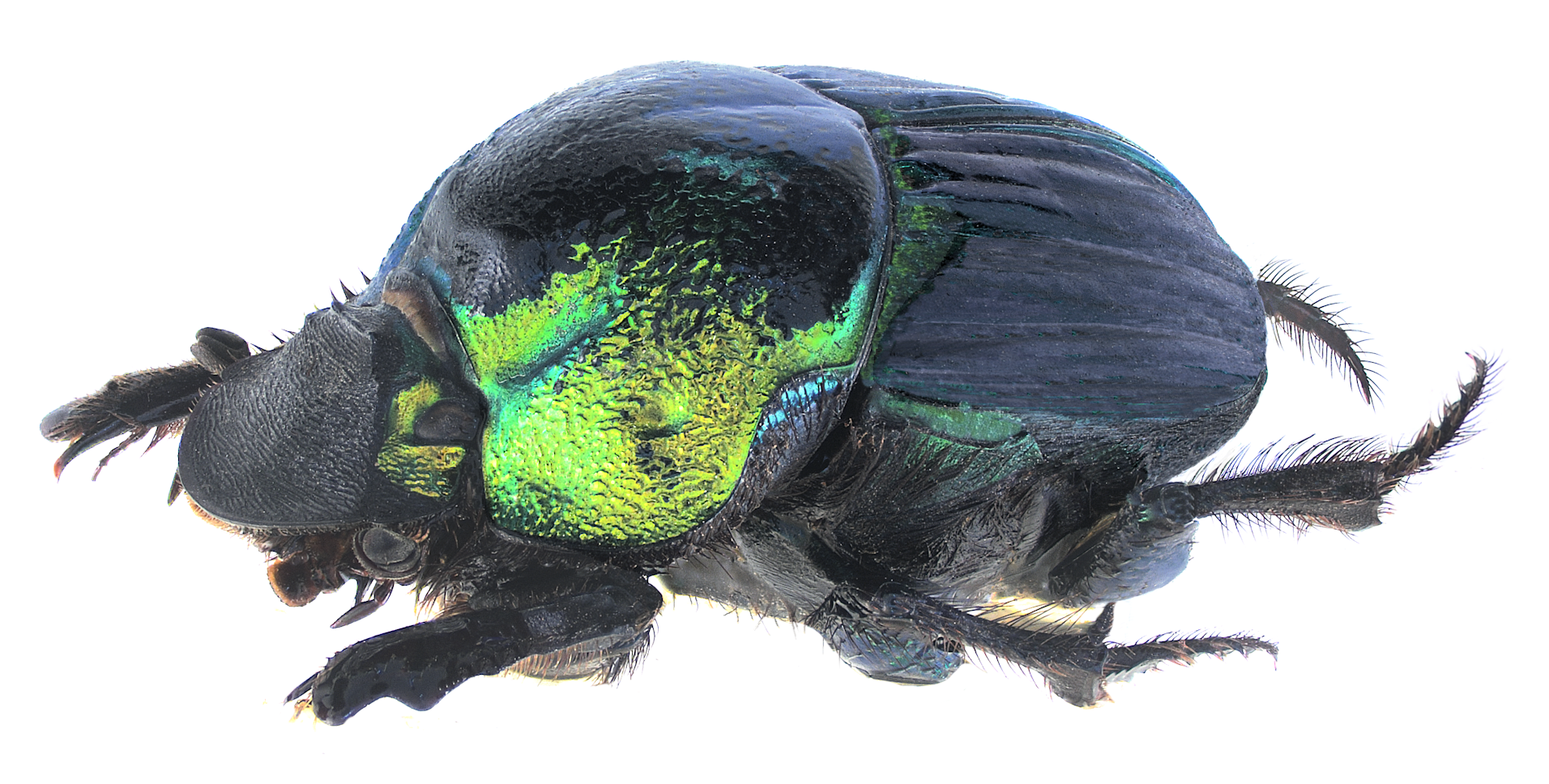
- P. d. demon male (top) and female (bottom)

Scientific classification
- Domain: Eukaryota
- Kingdom: Animalia
- Phylum: Arthropoda
- Class: Insecta
- Order: Coleoptera
- Suborder: Polyphaga
- Infraorder: Scarabaeiformia
- Family: Scarabaeidae
- Genus: Phanaeus
- Species: P. demon

Binomial name
- Phanaeus demon Castelnau, 1840

= Phanaeus demon =

Species of beetle

Phanaeus demon is a species of beetles belonging to the family Scarabaeidae. This species is often incorrectly named as "damon" in collections and in the literature.

== Subspecies ==
- Phanaeus demon demon Castelnau, 1840 (synonym Phanaeus damon Harold, 1863)
- Phanaeus demon excelsus Bates, 1887
- Phanaeus demon obliquans Bates, 1887

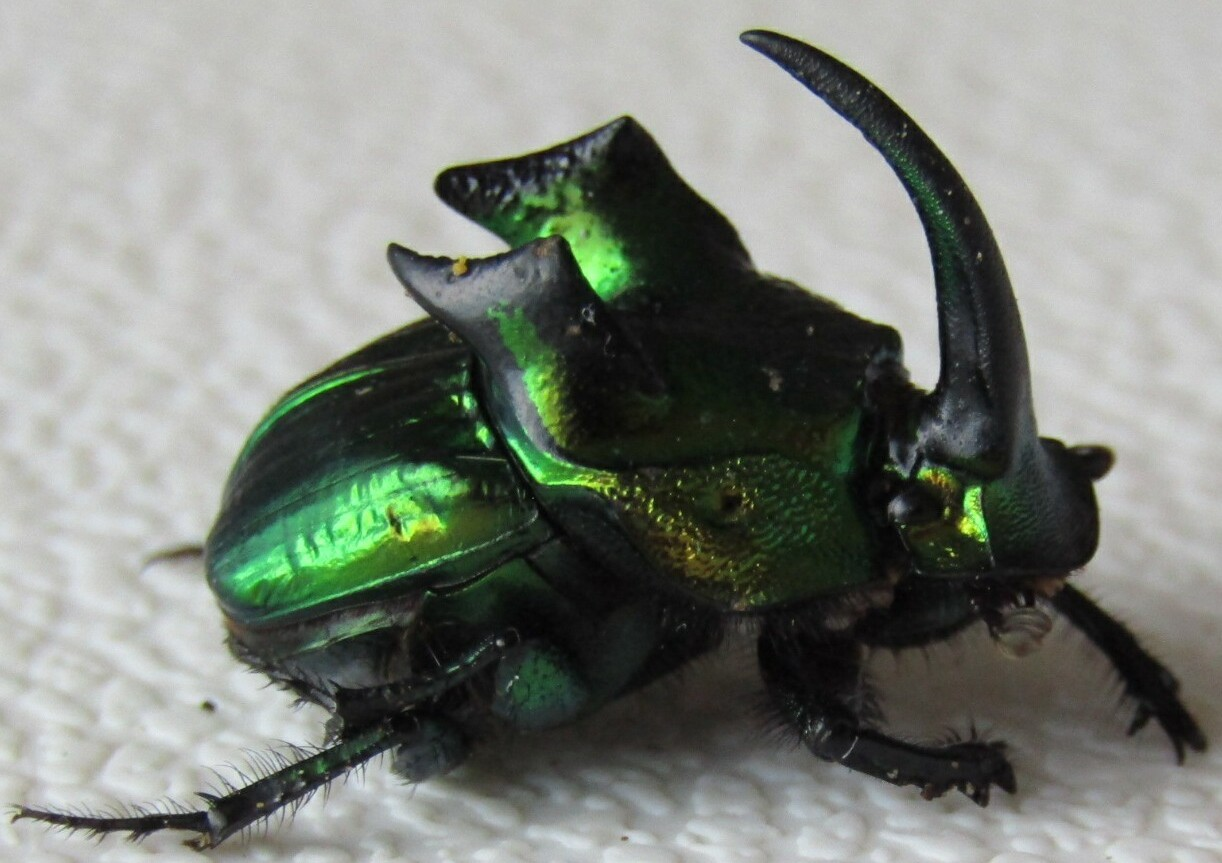
In Oaxaca, Mexico

== Description ==
Phanaeus demon can reach a length of about 10–21 millimetres (0.39–0.83 in). It is a highly variable species. These beetles show an erect horn recurved towards the tip. The females are smaller than the males. Dorsum is highly shining. Color is quite variable, usually brilliant green with yellow reflections or golden green or brilliant copper-red with green reflections. Elytra have fine striae, often minutely punctured. Adults are coprophagous.

== Distribution and habitat ==
This species is present in Mexico and Central America. It can be found in semidesert scrub and in open deciduous forests at an elevation of 0–900 metres (0–2,953 ft) above sea level.

== Bibliography ==
- Harold E.von (1863) Note sur les espèces mexicains du genre Phanaeus et descriptions de quelques espèces nouvelles de coléoptères Mexicaines, Annales de la Société Entomologique de France. Paris 4(3):161-176
- Sturm J. (1843) Catalog der Kaefer-Sammlung von Jacob Sturm, Nurnberg :1-386
- Castelnau F. (1840) Histoire Naturelle des Insectes Coléoptères. Avec une introduction renfermant L'Anatomie et la Physiologie des Animaux Articulés, par M.Brullé, P.Duménil. Paris 2:1-564
- Scarabs: World Scarabaeidae Database. Schoolmeesters P., 2011-05-30
