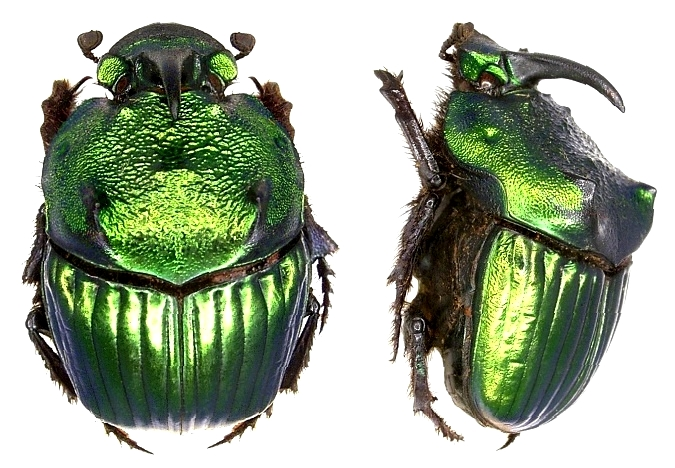

Scientific classification
- Domain: Eukaryota
- Kingdom: Animalia
- Phylum: Arthropoda
- Class: Insecta
- Order: Coleoptera
- Suborder: Polyphaga
- Infraorder: Scarabaeiformia
- Family: Scarabaeidae
- Genus: Phanaeus
- Species: P. amithaon

Binomial name
- Phanaeus amithaon Harold, 1875

= Phanaeus amithaon =

Species of beetle

Phanaeus amithaon is a species of dung beetle in the family Scarabaeidae.
