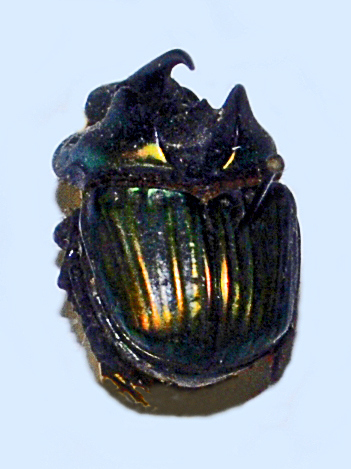
- Phanaeus splendidulus. Museum specimen

Scientific classification
- Kingdom: Animalia
- Phylum: Arthropoda
- Class: Insecta
- Order: Coleoptera
- Suborder: Polyphaga
- Infraorder: Scarabaeiformia
- Family: Scarabaeidae
- Genus: Phanaeus
- Species: P. splendidulus

Binomial name
- Phanaeus splendidulus (Fabricius, 1781)

Synonyms
- Copris floriger Kirby, 1818; Phanaeus corydon Blanchard, 1846; Scarabaeus splendidulus Fabricius, 1781

= Phanaeus splendidulus =

Species of beetle

Phanaeus splendidulus is a species of beetles belonging to the family Scarabaeidae.

== Description ==
Phanaeus splendidulus can reach a length of about 20 millimetres (0.79 in). The female is smaller than the male. It shows a long erect horn recurved towards the tip. The basic body color is bronze-green.

== Distribution ==
This species can be found in Brazil, Uruguay and Argentina.
