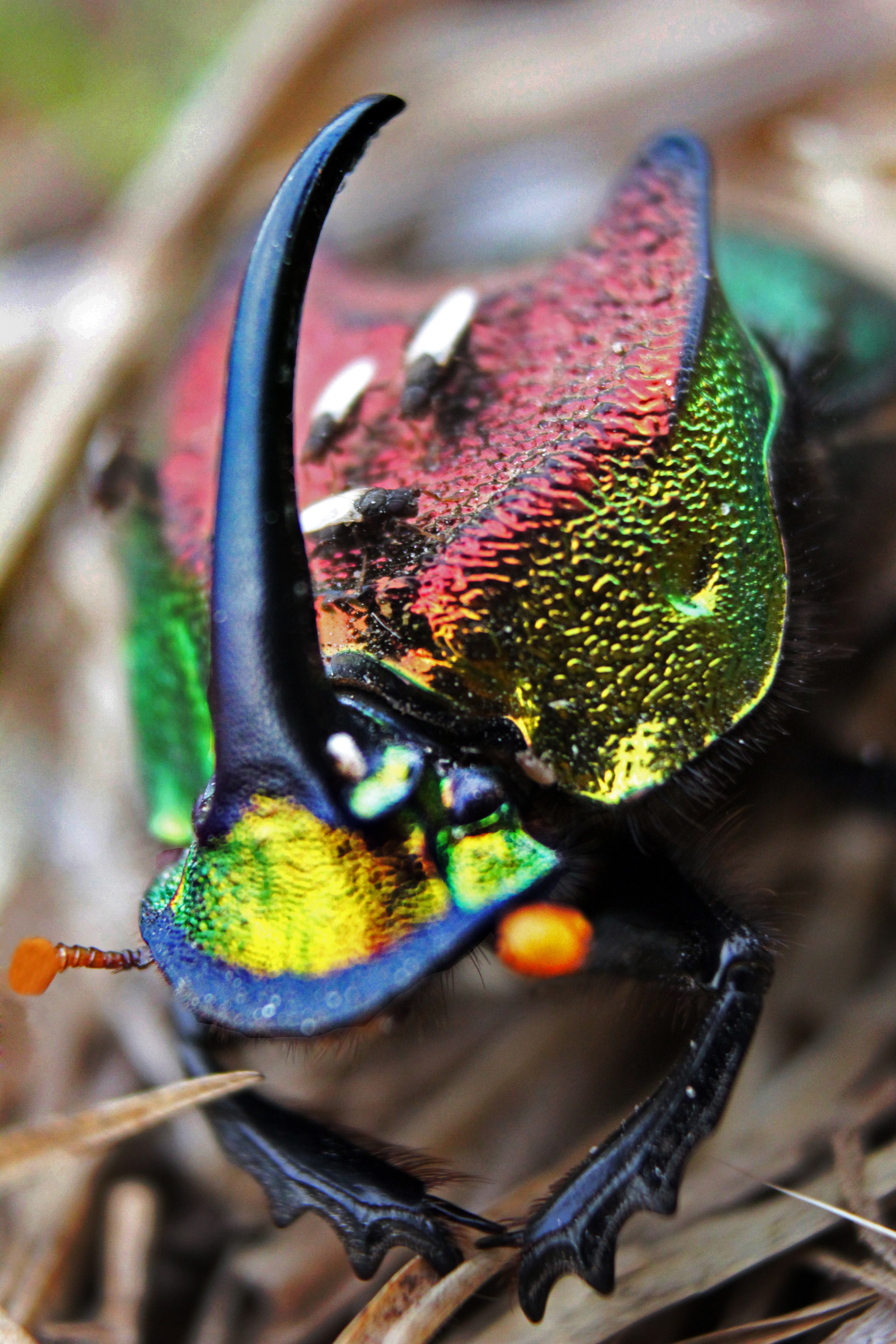

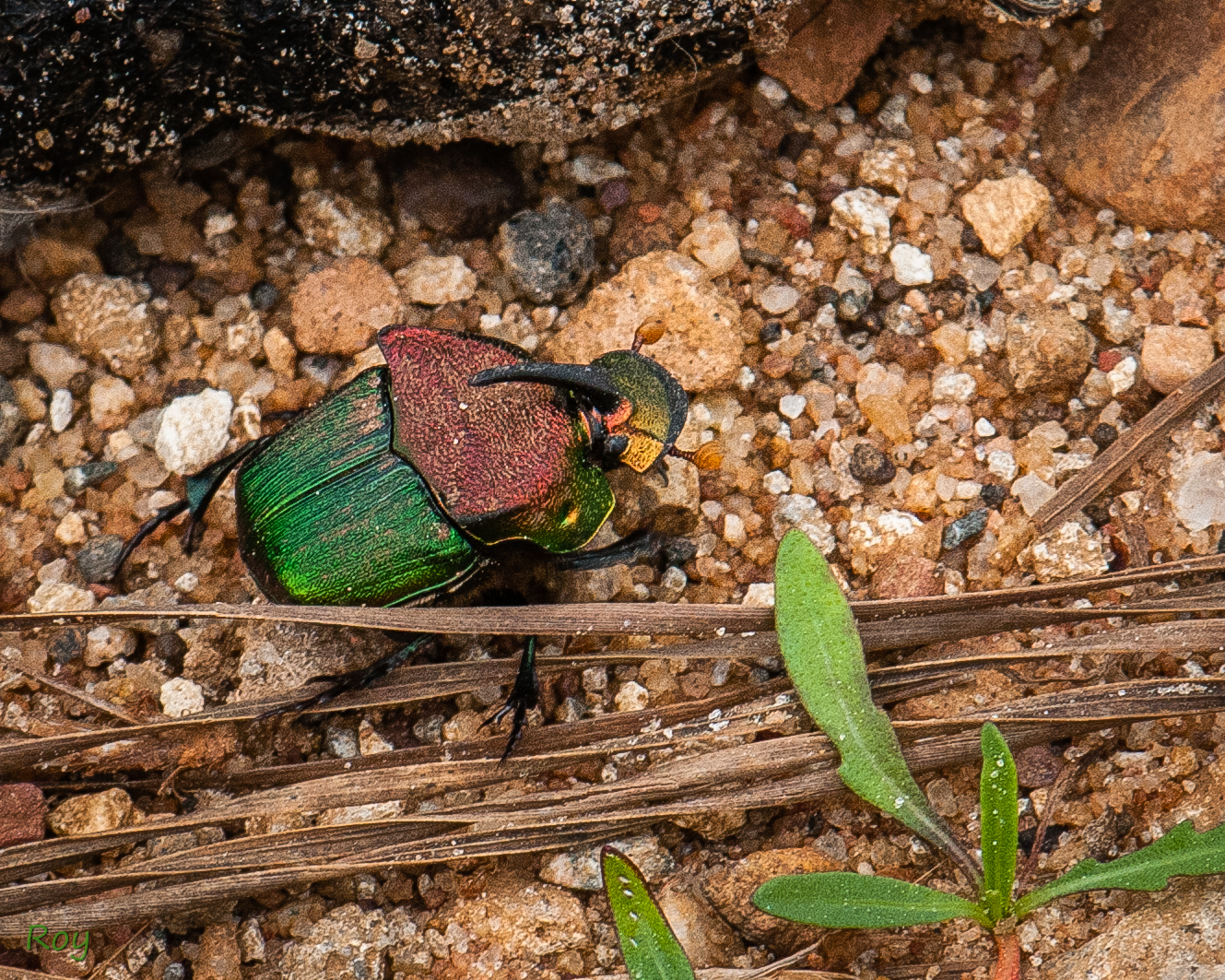
- Male rainbow scarabs

Scientific classification
- Kingdom: Animalia
- Phylum: Arthropoda
- Clade: Pancrustacea
- Class: Insecta
- Order: Coleoptera
- Suborder: Polyphaga
- Infraorder: Scarabaeiformia
- Family: Scarabaeidae
- Genus: Phanaeus
- Species: P. vindex

Binomial name
- Phanaeus vindex MacLeay, 1819

= Phanaeus vindex =

Species of beetle

Phanaeus vindex, also known as a rainbow scarab (like other members in its genus), is a North American species of true dung beetle in the family Scarabaeidae. It is found in eastern and central United States (Florida and New England to Arizona and Wyoming) and northern Mexico. It is the most widespread species of Phanaeus in the United States and it has a wide habitat tolerance. It may hybridize with the generally less common P. difformis.

== Description ==
P. vindex adults are hard-bodied beetles which range from approximately 11-22 millimeters (0.4-0.9 inches) in length. They are relatively bulky and oblong. These beetles are sexually dimorphic; the males can be identified by their iridescent elytra and a large horn on their heads while females have slightly less vibrant shells and lack horns. Females also have different numbers of segments on their abdomen than males. Additionally, the ends of male abdomens raise above the elytra, however, in females, they do not. On top of this, the abdomen is distinctly colored in both sexes. Like most Phanaeus species, male rainbow scarabs can be observed in either a major morph with large horns and bodies, or a minor morph, with significantly reduced horn and body size.

== Food resources ==
Because P. vindex is a member of the Scarabaeinae sub-family, they are considered to be “true dung beetles” and feed exclusively on fecal excrement through all stages of their life cycle. While they do prefer to feed on dung from pasture animals, rainbow scarabs do sometimes feed on wild animal feces in more forestal areas. Research has shown that rainbow scarabs have certain preferences when selecting feces to feed on; they are most attracted to excrement that is considered “fragrant” or produced by organisms that have very diverse diets. They tend to consume dung from omnivores such as pigs and cows and will sometimes select herbivore dung, but they are least attracted to dung produced by carnivorous animals. P. vindex is afforded a very wide range of feces in their diet as a result of being able to occupy various habitats and soil types across seasons. Typically, however, these beetles do prefer clay soils, in contrast with other scarab beetles which may be more prevalent in sandy habitats.

Larvae of all dung beetles have biting mouthparts to help consume the feces, but when dung beetles in the Scarabaeidae family reach their adult stage, they develop specialized mouthparts in addition to the biting portions. Some of these include mandibular and maxillary fine fringes which can filter liquid and semi-liquid portions of the dung while eating, and molars, which can finely grind down solid particles in dung suspensions. Dung beetles also typically create nests around and within their food sources, but this behavior varies across species. P. vindex and other Phanaeus beetles exhibit complex paracoprid nesting, meaning they tunnel in order to create nests below piles of dung and build complex tunnels by which they can communicate and exchange food with nearby beetles. To do this, adults bury a large amount of fecal excrement and make many brood balls where they can keep their young. P. vindex also exhibits protective behaviors by protecting these brood balls with a cement-like layer of dung around the surface. The young beetles in brood balls will then feed off the dung until they reach maturity and can forage for food on their own.

== Parasites ==
Due to the nature of their food resources, P. vindex is often exposed to parasites that live within fecal matter, such as Physocephalus sexalatus, a nematode parasite. These parasites live within various animals and then are consumed by dung beetles. When consumed, the beetles start to consume approximately half as much dung as they did before. Individual infected beetles are less effective at interacting with their environments and also will end up moving less dung. They dig shorter tunnels and produce fewer offspring.

== Mating ==
As a dung beetle exhibiting paracoprid behavior, or tunneling, both sexes of adult P. vindex work to make the tunnel network in which they will store dung and create brood balls where young can be incubated. To do this, they burrow below the pile of dung they have established and create a chamber; in doing so, they naturally sift the soil around their dung pats, allowing for redistribution of nutrients and loose soil which they use to fill the tunnels so they can protect brood balls in the chamber.

When making the pear-shaped brood balls, P. vindex females perform what looks like a “butting” motion in order to push dung away from where it was originally placed. This behavior attracts males, who will work with the female to make the dung into a ball and roll it into the chamber through the tunnel system they construct together. Once the brood ball is at the bottom of the tunnels, female oviposition occurs, in which she places an egg in the center of the dung ball; several brood balls can be formed in this way, after which all of them will be coated with soil to preserve their quality. Once all the eggs have been positioned in the chamber, the male and female pair construct a second tunnel which contains food for newly hatched beetles as well as those that remain below the soil in colder climates.

Like all beetles, P. vindex undergoes a larval stage followed by pupation before they reach their adult stage. The larvae and both the molting processes happen within the brood ball; it is only when these beetles reach their adult stage that they emerge from the dung in which their parents housed them. The time it takes for these rainbow scarabs to complete these stages ranges between two and six months, with the entire lifespan of the beetle being less than a year. In colder areas, adults will remain in the tunnel networks below the frost line until temperatures increase, after which they will emerge. Because P. vindex have such a varied distribution, most of them undergo the overwintering process under soil.

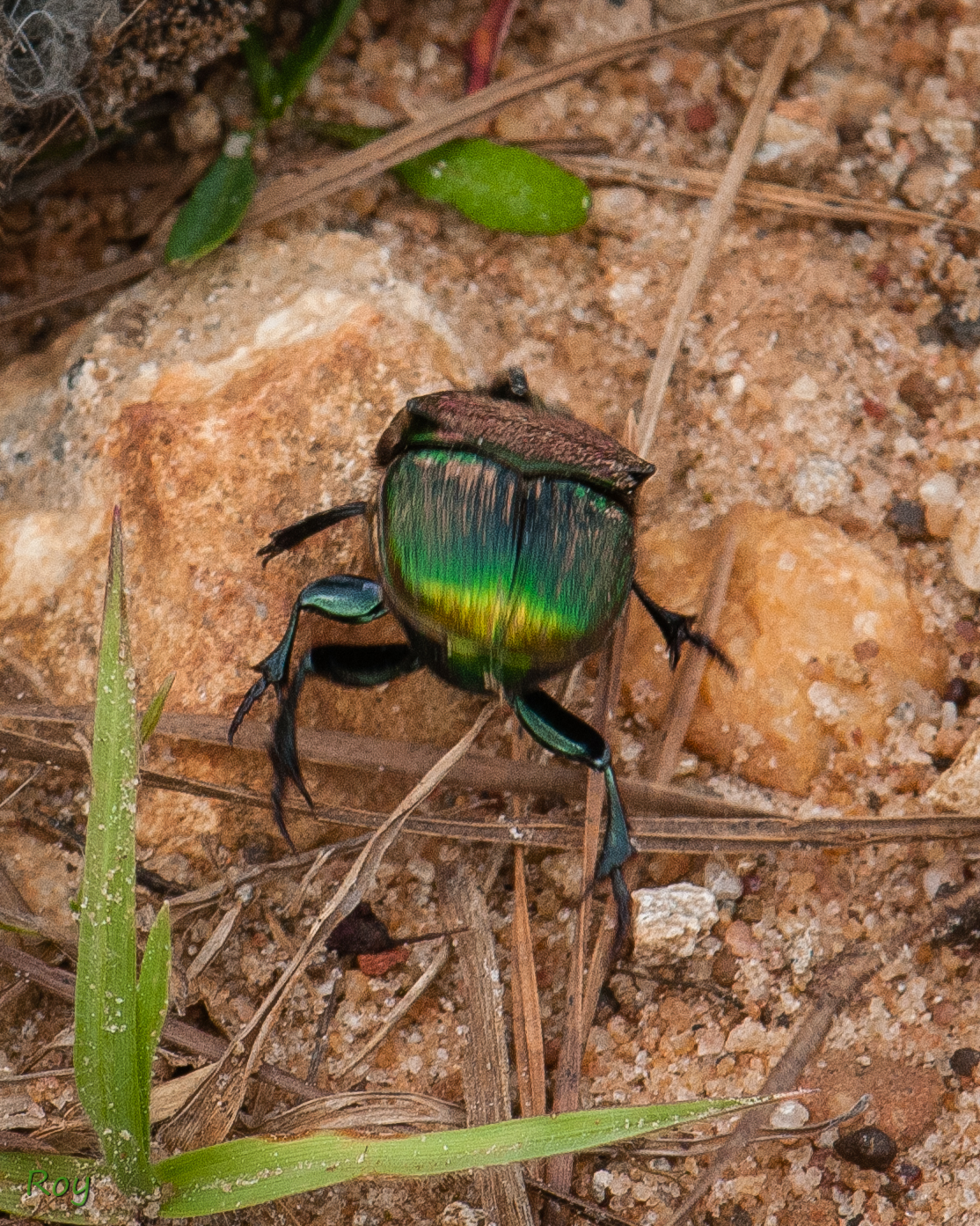

After adults emerge from the soil, they begin the search for a new mate, after which the tunneling process will begin anew. Research has shown that the contents of soil heavily dictate where P. vindex choose to locate their dung pats and tunnel networks, especially because the sandy soils that most other scarab beetles prefer cause larval desiccation in P. vindex.

== Mating ==
Studies have demonstrated that among all dung beetles, but especially P. vindex, feeding and reproductive behaviors have a very close relationship. Both sexes of rainbow scarabs need to consume dung regularly in order to become sexually mature, but females especially need to have this particular diet so they can oviposit.

Among P. vindex, there is varying parental investment, with the females tending to invest more in their offspring than the males. However, it has been observed that females that exhibit higher parental investment through the entire breeding process will tend to choose males that are likely to invest more. During a breeding season, one male and one female will form a breeding pair and conduct all the processes necessary to produce brood balls, but female P. vindex are iteroparous, meaning they can undergo multiple reproductive events in a lifetime, and these can occur with multiple males. Even during one mating season, females will be willing to mate with multiple males, so males need to fight to maintain exclusive access. Males and females will work together to create the tunnel networks and feeding galleries under the dung pats long before the female is sexually mature, and selection has shown to favor males that help in the paracoprid activities and food positioning throughout the tunnel networks. Males will typically fight off other rivals at or around the burrows they have helped create because they can better defend females and their eggs there.

== Development ==
Because P. vindex are able to inhabit such a wide range of habitats, research has been conducted to investigate whether their reproductive habits change according to environmental factors to maximize offspring growth and development, or whether they remain a consistent behavior across all members of the species. One such factor is temperature, which has been known to impact insect development. However, reproductive behavior plasticity based on temperature differences can impact earlier life stage development, so this has been an area of focus.

P. vindex has been observed altering its reproductive behavior based on temperature. Higher temperatures during development have shown to cause faster transitions between life cycle stages, smaller adult body sizes, and potentially, lower survival rates. Consequently, when they are in warmer climates, females tend to produce more brood balls and bury them deeper to get the broods to cooler areas and have more surrounding soil to protect dung quality. This can come at a cost to brood ball size which, because they are made out of the dung from which offspring get sustenance, can affect offspring nutrition. While there can be some consequences to these behaviors, findings have shown that this plastic adult behavior is adaptive and it can actually buffer developing offspring from temperature changes, which could otherwise adversely impact fitness of adult rainbow scarabs.

Although not all dung beetles experience fitness trade-offs by engaging in these adaptive reproductive behaviors, P. vindex does. The most observable of these trade-offs is that brood balls are smaller as nesting depth increases to a certain extent. Additionally, although deeper nesting can protect offspring from high temperatures, it can cost parents time and energy, which can affect other fitness traits. However, studies have shown that up to an optimal temperature, cold-blooded organisms can become more productive, potentially allowing them to dig through and transport dung more efficiently. Consequently, it is possible that behavioral plasticity in response to varying temperatures can produce more offspring that have a greater chance of survival, even if the offspring do end up being smaller than their typical size.
