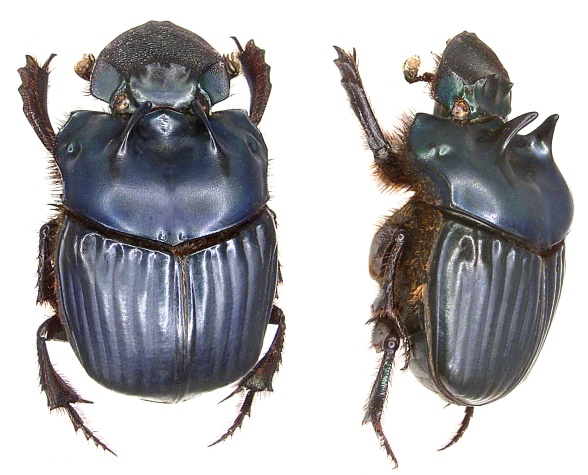
- Female
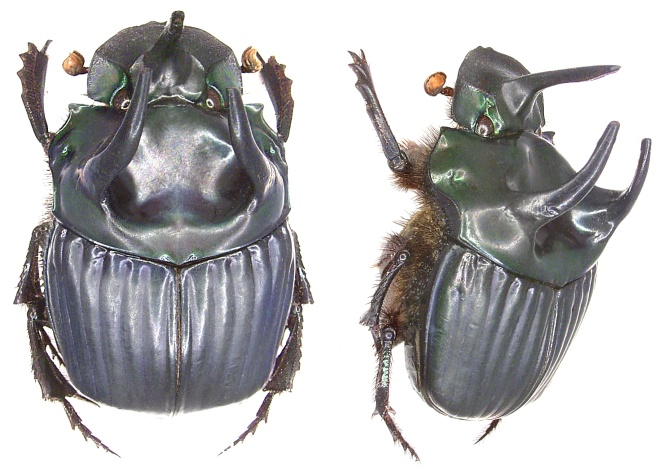
- Male

Scientific classification
- Kingdom: Animalia
- Phylum: Arthropoda
- Class: Insecta
- Order: Coleoptera
- Suborder: Polyphaga
- Infraorder: Scarabaeiformia
- Family: Scarabaeidae
- Genus: Phanaeus
- Species: P. haroldi

Binomial name
- Phanaeus haroldi Kirsch, 1871

Synonyms
- Phanaeus schneblei Frey, 1963

= Phanaeus haroldi =

Species of beetle

Phanaeus haroldi is a species of beetle of the family Scarabaeidae. It is found in Brazil, Colombia, Ecuador, Peru and Venezuela.

== Description ==
Adults reach a length of about 18–22 mm. The upper and lower surfaces are black and dull, with a slight bronze sheen. The clypeus is evenly pointed, slightly emarginate at the apex and without teeth. The pronotum has laterally projecting anterior angles, the sides are strongly curved and the base is margined except for the projecting midline. On the disc of the pronotum is a deep and wide cavity, on each side of which is an inwardly inclined, conical horn. The horns have a broad base that blends into the lateral margin of the cavity.
