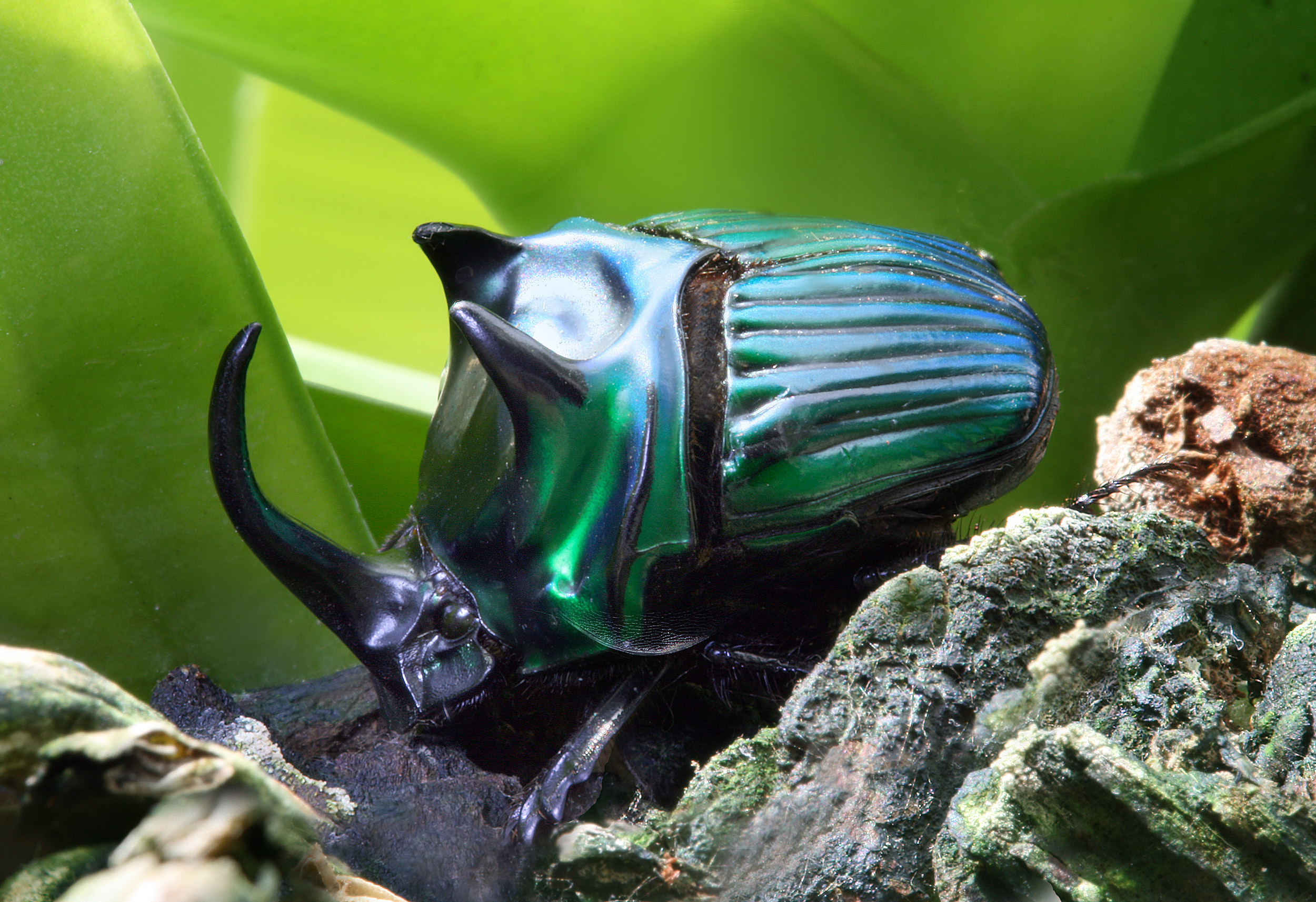
- male Oxysternon conspicillatum

Scientific classification
- Domain: Eukaryota
- Kingdom: Animalia
- Phylum: Arthropoda
- Class: Insecta
- Order: Coleoptera
- Suborder: Polyphaga
- Infraorder: Scarabaeiformia
- Family: Scarabaeidae
- Tribe: Phanaeini
- Genus: Oxysternon; Laporte, 1840

Type species
- Scarabaeus festivum

Synonyms
- Sternaspis Hope, 1837; Strombodes Gistel, 1857

= Oxysternon =

Genus of beetles

Oxysternon is a Neotropical genus of scarab beetles (Scarabaeidae) in the superfamily Scarabaeoidea. It can be distinguished from all other phanaeines and scarabaeine dung beetles by a long, spiniform extension of the anterior angle of the metasternum. Most species vary in color and pattern, and are more commonly found in tones of green, often infused with yellow or coppery highlights. All species appear very smooth or glassy smooth to the unaided eye.

== Taxonomy ==
=== Nomenclature ===
The genus Sternaspis was proposed first by Hope in 1837, but the name was preoccupied and thus invalid. Laporte, writing under the pen name of Le Compte de Castelnau, proposed the genus Oxysternon to include several species of Phanaeus-like species. O. festivum was later designated as the type species.

=== Phylogeny ===
The genus is monophyletic and its sister group is the genus Phanaeus. Two subgenera and two further species groups are recognized by some authors. It has been suggested that the current distribution of the species reflect vicariance events following climatic fluctuations in the Amazon.

=== Species ===
There are currently 11 species in the genus Oxysternon.

- Oxysternon conspicillatum Weber, 1801
- Oxysternon durantoni Arnaud, 1984
- Oxysternon ebeninum (Nevinson, 1890)
- Oxysternon festivum (Linnaeus, 1767)
- Oxysternon lautum (Macleay, 1819)
- Oxysternon macleayi (Nevinson, 1892)
- Oxysternon palaemon Laporte, 1840
- Oxysternon pteroderum Nevinson, 1892
- Oxysternon silenus Laporte, 1840
- Oxysternon spiniferum Laporte, 1840
- Oxysternon striatopunctatum Olsoufieff, 1924

== Distribution and habitat ==
Oxysternon is a Neotropical genus and most species are native to the Amazon basin or the Guiana Shield in South America. The ranges of the widespread O. conspicillatum and O. silenus also extend into the Chocó and southern Central America. Only two species are absent from both the Amazon basin and the Guiana Shield: O. pteroderum is restricted to Atlantic Forest in eastern Brazil and the common O. palaemon is found widely in the Cerrado. Except for O. palaemon from the Cerrado, Oxysternon species inhabit very humid to mesic forest, sometimes extending slightly into nearby drier woodlands and savanna, and they have different degrees of tolerance to fragmentation and forest degradation.

== Behavior ==
The behavior of Oxysternon species has not been studied in detail. All species seem to be coprophagous or copro-necrophagous, although fruit pulp is sometimes used as an adult food resource.
