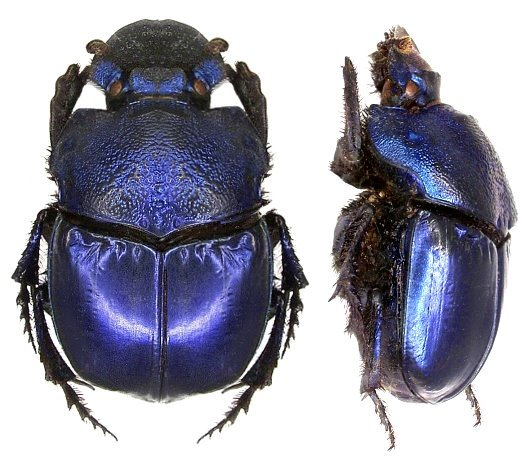

Scientific classification
- Domain: Eukaryota
- Kingdom: Animalia
- Phylum: Arthropoda
- Class: Insecta
- Order: Coleoptera
- Suborder: Polyphaga
- Infraorder: Scarabaeiformia
- Family: Scarabaeidae
- Genus: Phanaeus
- Species: P. quadridens

Binomial name
- Phanaeus quadridens (Say, 1835)

Synonyms
- Phanaeus borealis Laporte, 1840; Phanaeus laevipennis Sturm, 1843; Phanaeus violaceus DOlsoufieff, 1924

= Phanaeus quadridens =

Species of beetle

Phanaeus quadridens is a species of dung beetles in the family Scarabaeidae.

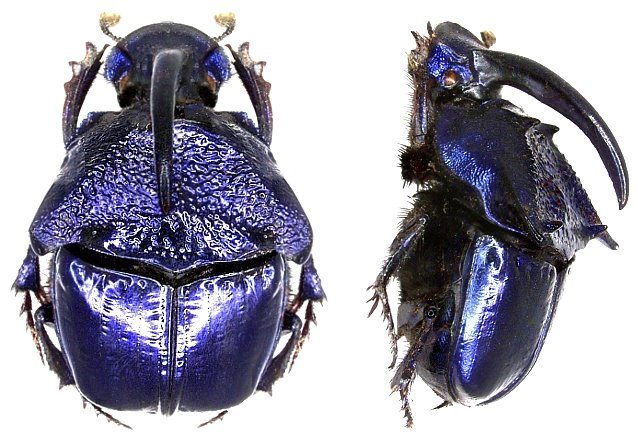

== Subspecies ==
These two subspecies belong to the species Phanaeus quadridens:

- Phanaeus quadridens borealis Olsoufieff, 1924
- Phanaeus quadridens quadridens
