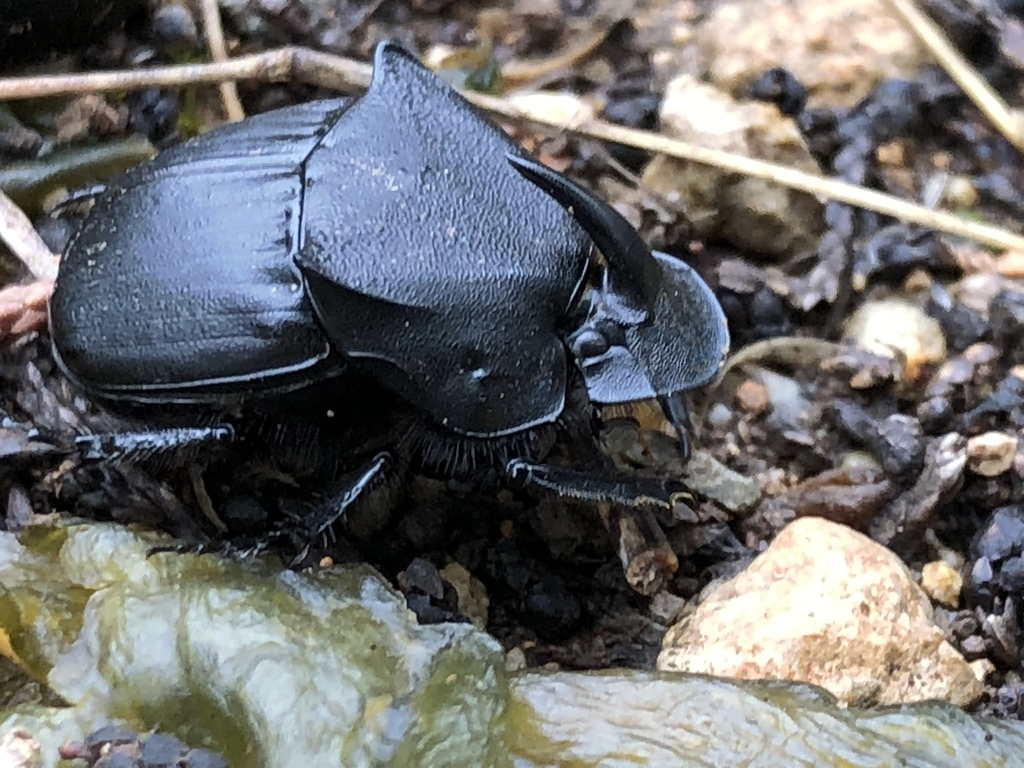
- male Phanaeus triangularis texensis

Scientific classification
- Domain: Eukaryota
- Kingdom: Animalia
- Phylum: Arthropoda
- Class: Insecta
- Order: Coleoptera
- Suborder: Polyphaga
- Infraorder: Scarabaeiformia
- Family: Scarabaeidae
- Genus: Phanaeus
- Species: P. triangularis

Binomial name
- Phanaeus triangularis (Say, 1823)

= Phanaeus triangularis =

Species of beetle

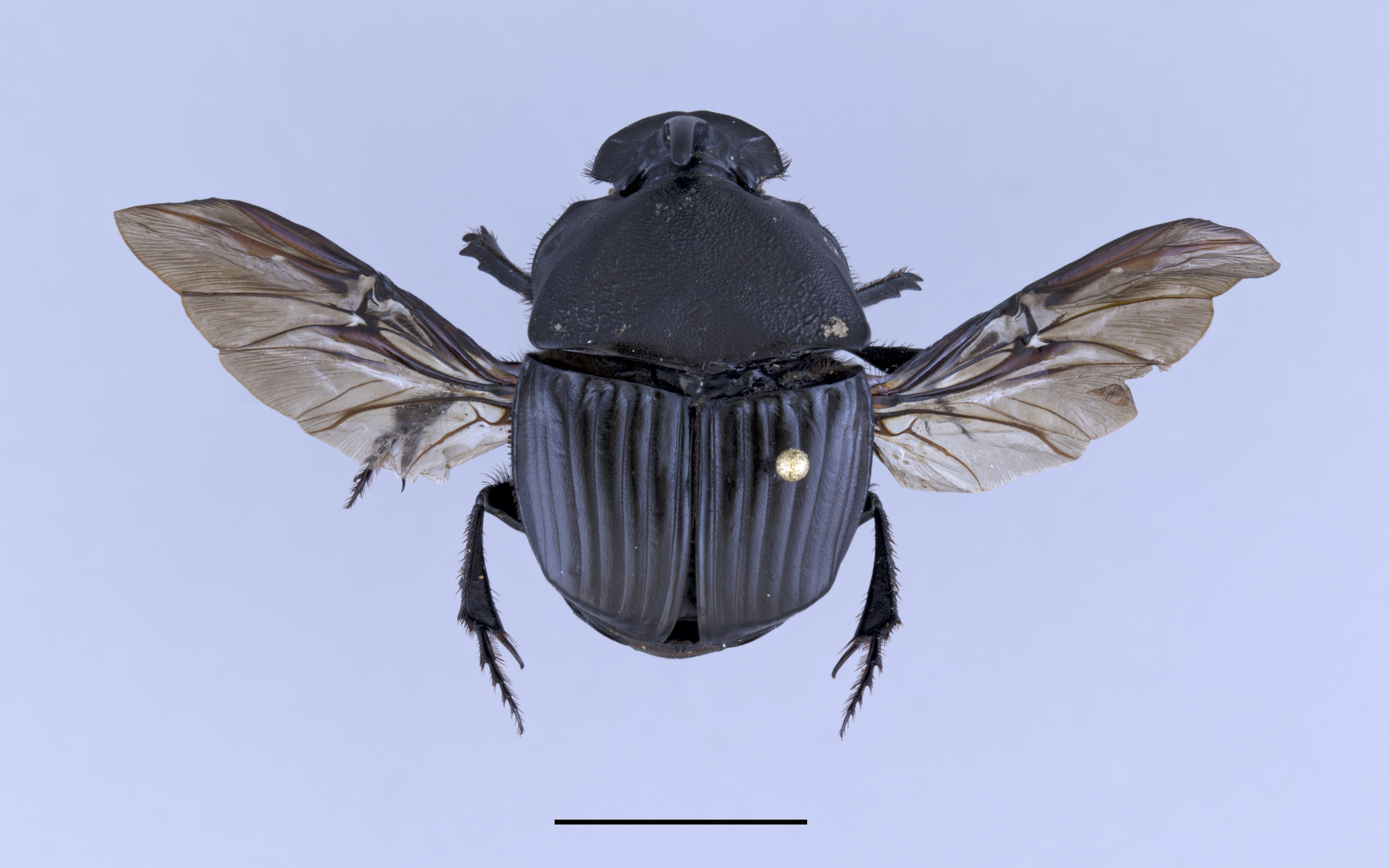
Dorsal view of a Phanaeus triangularis (Say, 1823) specimen collected from Treutlen County, Georgia on October 3, 2024. Scale bar indicates 10 mm.

Phanaeus triangularis, the black phanaeus, is a North American species of true dung beetle in the family Scarabaeidae. It is found in the eastern half of the United States.

== Subspecies ==
Three subspecies of Phanaeus triangularis are sometimes recognized, but niger is often considered a synonym of triangularis and texensis (from Texas and adjacent regions) is often considered a separate species.

- Phanaeus triangularis niger Olsoufieff, 1924
- Phanaeus triangularis texensis Edmonds, 1994
- Phanaeus triangularis triangularis (Say, 1823)
