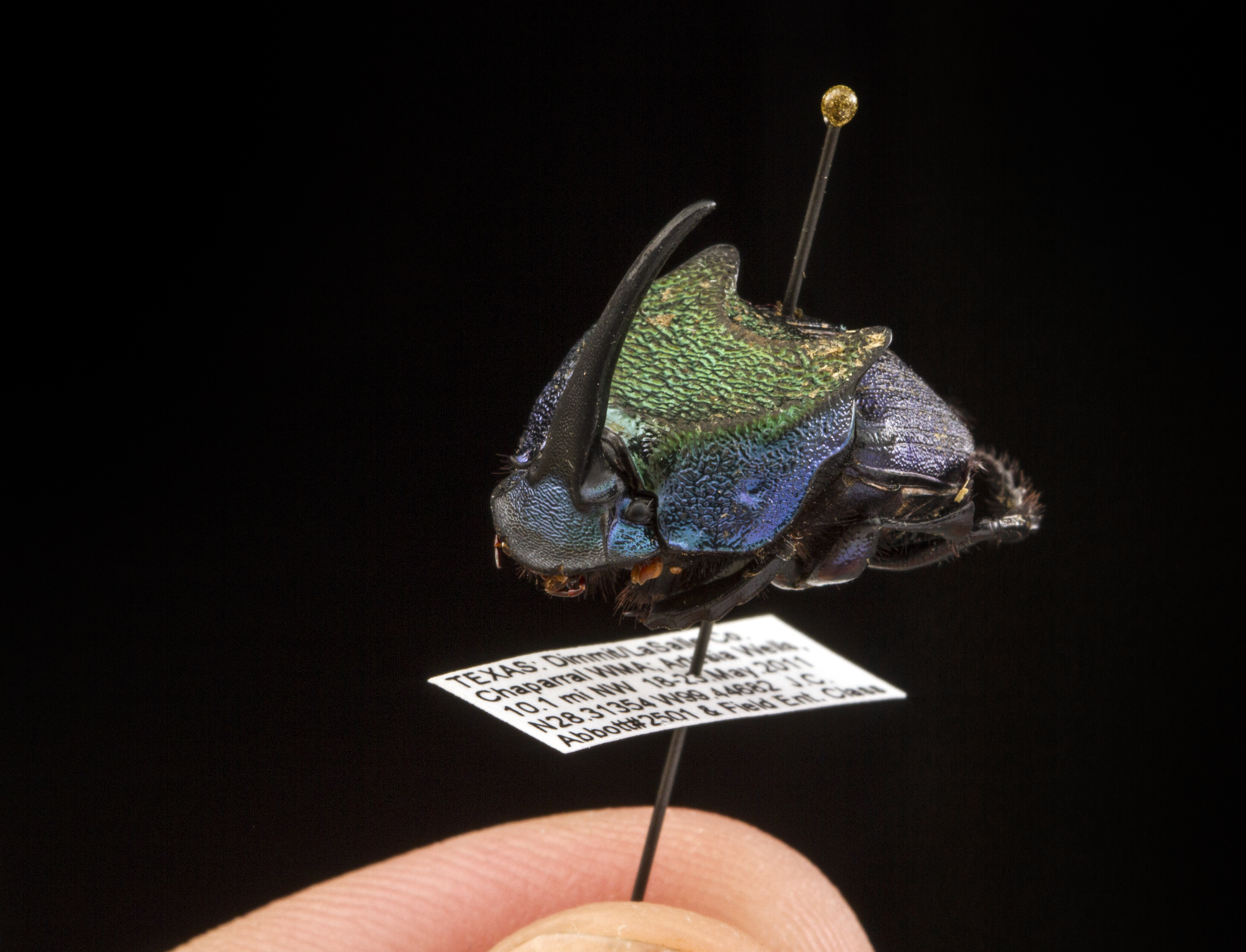
- male

Scientific classification
- Domain: Eukaryota
- Kingdom: Animalia
- Phylum: Arthropoda
- Class: Insecta
- Order: Coleoptera
- Suborder: Polyphaga
- Infraorder: Scarabaeiformia
- Family: Scarabaeidae
- Genus: Phanaeus
- Species: P. difformis

Binomial name
- Phanaeus difformis Leconte, 1847

Synonyms
- Phanaeus magnificens Robinson, 1948

= Phanaeus difformis =

Species of beetle

Phanaeus difformis is a species of true dung beetle in the family Scarabaeidae that is native to south-central United States and adjacent far northern Mexico. It may hybridize with the generally more common P. vindex.
