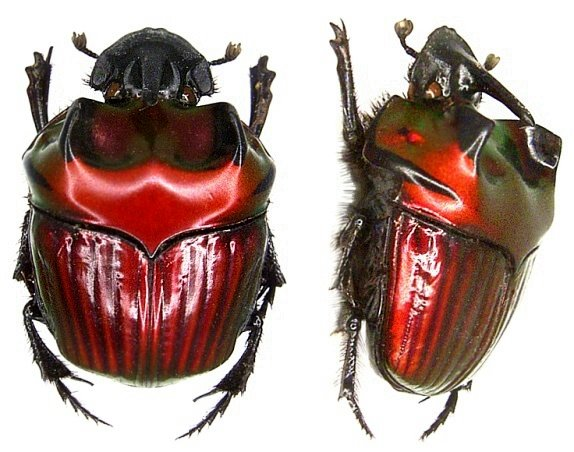
- male

Scientific classification
- Kingdom: Animalia
- Phylum: Arthropoda
- Clade: Pancrustacea
- Class: Insecta
- Order: Coleoptera
- Suborder: Polyphaga
- Infraorder: Scarabaeiformia
- Family: Scarabaeidae
- Genus: Oxysternon
- Species: O. festivum

Binomial name
- Oxysternon festivum Linnaeus, 1767

= Oxysternon festivum =

Species of beetle

Oxysternon festivum is a species of dung beetle of the scarab beetle family. It is a common, diurnal species from northeastern South America and Trinidad where it mostly inhabits forest.

== Taxonomy and nomenclature ==
Original Illustration of Oxysternon festivum by Rösel, designated as holotype.

Oxysternon festivum was among the first dung beetle species studied by zoologist in the early 18th century. The first illustration of an "exceedingly beautiful shining gold and red, three horned beetle" was published in 1747 by August Johann Rösel von Rosenhof, and a first description was done by Laurens Theodorus Gronovius in 1764, but the names applied were non-binomial and therefore invalid for nomenclatural purposes. It was later re-described by Carl Linnaeus under the name of Scarabaeus festivus, and was subsequently included in most publications regarding exotic insects in the late 18th and early 19th centuries.

O. festivum was once assigned to the genus Sternaspis, but the name was preoccupied and thus invalid. Laporte, writing under the pen name of Le Compte de Castelnau, proposed the genus Oxysternon to include several species of Phaneus-like species with a long, spiniform extension of the anterior angle of the metasternum. O. festivum was later designated as the type species of this genus.

Two color phases were described as aberrations by Olsoufieff in 1924, and formalised as subspecies by Arnaud in 2002, using the names O. festivum nigerrimum for the black form from Trinidad and O. festivum viridanum for the green form of the South American mainland. However, the green form occurs uncommonly but widely together with the typical coppery-red form of the South American mainland, leading later authorities to recognize the former as a morph, not a separate subspecies.

== Distribution and habitat ==
This species largely is restricted to the Guiana Shield and can be found in French Guiana, Guyana, Suriname, Venezuela, eastern Colombia, northeastern Brazil, and Trinidad. The vast majority of its range is north of the Amazon River.

O. festivum mostly lives in tropical humid forests, but may also occur in savanna and can tolerate certain degree of habitat changes. It occurs from near sea level to an altitude of 1,500 m (4,900 ft).

== Appearance ==
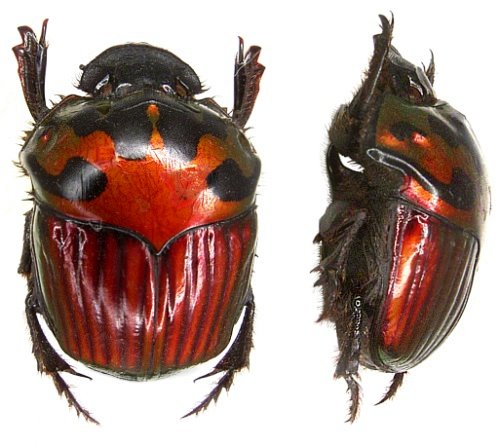
Female Oxysternon festivum

Adults are 14–25 mm (0.55–0.98 in) long, with average being 21 mm (0.83 in). The species show sexual polymorphism: Major males are horned and females are hornless, while minor males are hornless and often smaller than major males. Females and minor males differ in details of the head shape, specifically the transverse carina.

O. festivum has a colored upperside and black head and underside; the pronotum is smooth. As most Oxysternon species, it has considerable variation in the color of the upperside. In mainland South America, it is typically metallic coppery-red, sometimes with greenish highlights, but occasionally it can be metallic green or rarely black with reddish tones. On the island of Trinidad, the upperside is entirely black and thus it is considered as a separate subspecies, O. festivum nigerrimum.

== Behaviour ==
O. festivum is attracted to dung, carrion and fruits as food resources, but only commonly feeds and breeds on dung from mammals, less frequently carrion.

It has not been studied in O. festivum, but in related species of dung beetles where it has been studied the distinct male morphotypes are associated with different reproductive tactics: major males fight for females and guard and defend burrows actively, while minor males evade fights and try to sneak to the burrows to mate with females.
