= El Bochinche =

Town in Bolivar State, Venezuela

El Bochinche is a Venezuelan town on the border with Guyana in the Sifontes Municipality, state of Bolivar. Most of the population of El Bochinche is Amerindian.
