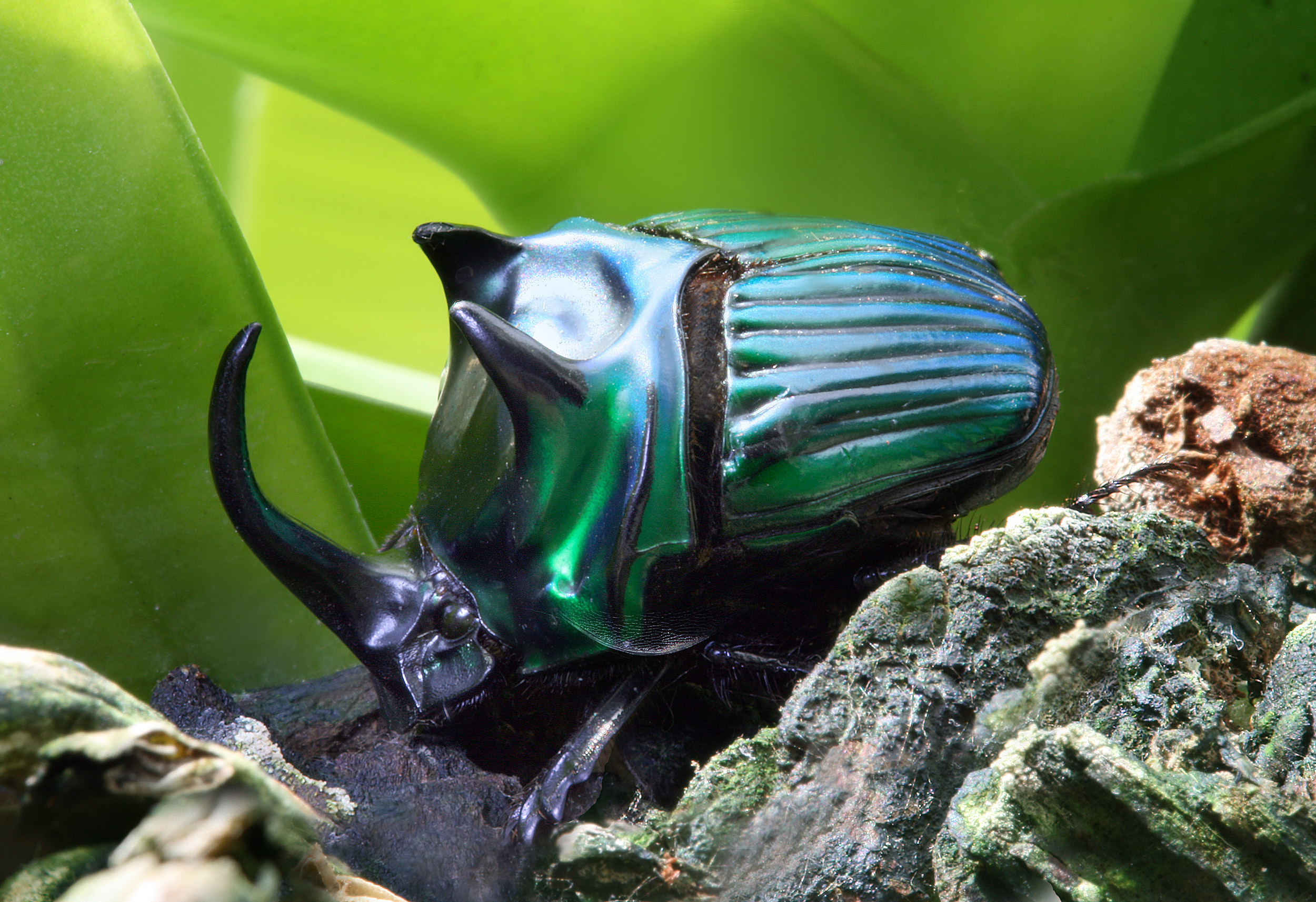
- male

Scientific classification
- Kingdom: Animalia
- Phylum: Arthropoda
- Clade: Pancrustacea
- Class: Insecta
- Order: Coleoptera
- Suborder: Polyphaga
- Infraorder: Scarabaeiformia
- Family: Scarabaeidae
- Genus: Oxysternon
- Species: O. conspicillatum

Binomial name
- Oxysternon conspicillatum (Weber, 1801)

Synonyms
- Copris conspicillata Weber, 1801; Oxysternon oberthuri Olsoufieff, 1924

= Oxysternon conspicillatum =

Species of beetle

Oxysternon conspicillatum is a species of dung beetle in the family Scarabaeidae. It is found in both evergreen and semi-deciduous mesic forests, including disturbed habitats, ranging from near sea level to an altitude of 3,000 m (9,800 ft) in the Amazon basin and Chocó of tropical South America and Panama, possibly extending as far west as the border region with Costa Rica. Both adults and young of this common and widespread beetle primarily feed on dung, but the species has also been recorded feeding on dead animals.

O. conspicillatum has been studied as a potential source for antimicrobial agents, with the possible use of its host defense peptides in the development of new antibiotics.

== Appearance ==
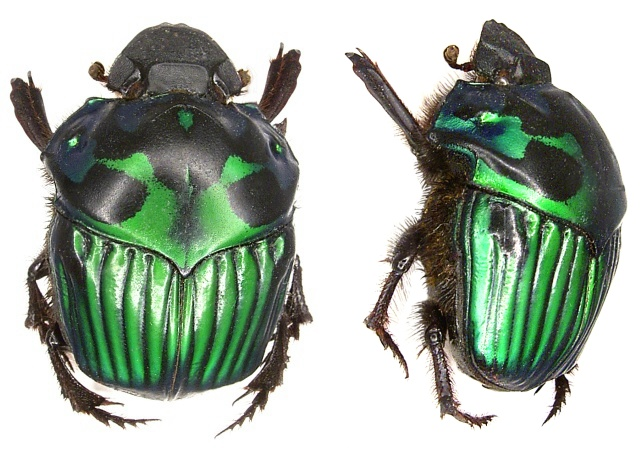
Female specimen

Adult O. conspicillatum have a length of 1.6–3.1 cm (0.63–1.22 in). The species exhibits some sexual dimorphism; large ("major") males have a large black horn on their head and two spikes on their pronotum while females' lack these. However, small ("minor") males are more female-like in their appearance, with the smallest essentially lacking a horn and pronotum spikes.

The species typically is metallic green, but occasionally it can be metallic dark blue or blue-green. Blue individuals were initially described as a separate species, O. oberthuri, and are sometimes still recognized as a distinct species or a subspecies of O. conspicillatum, but there are no differences except for the color, intermediates occur, and there is no geographical pattern (all colors may occur together), leading recent authorities to typically consider them as color phases of a single monotypic species.
