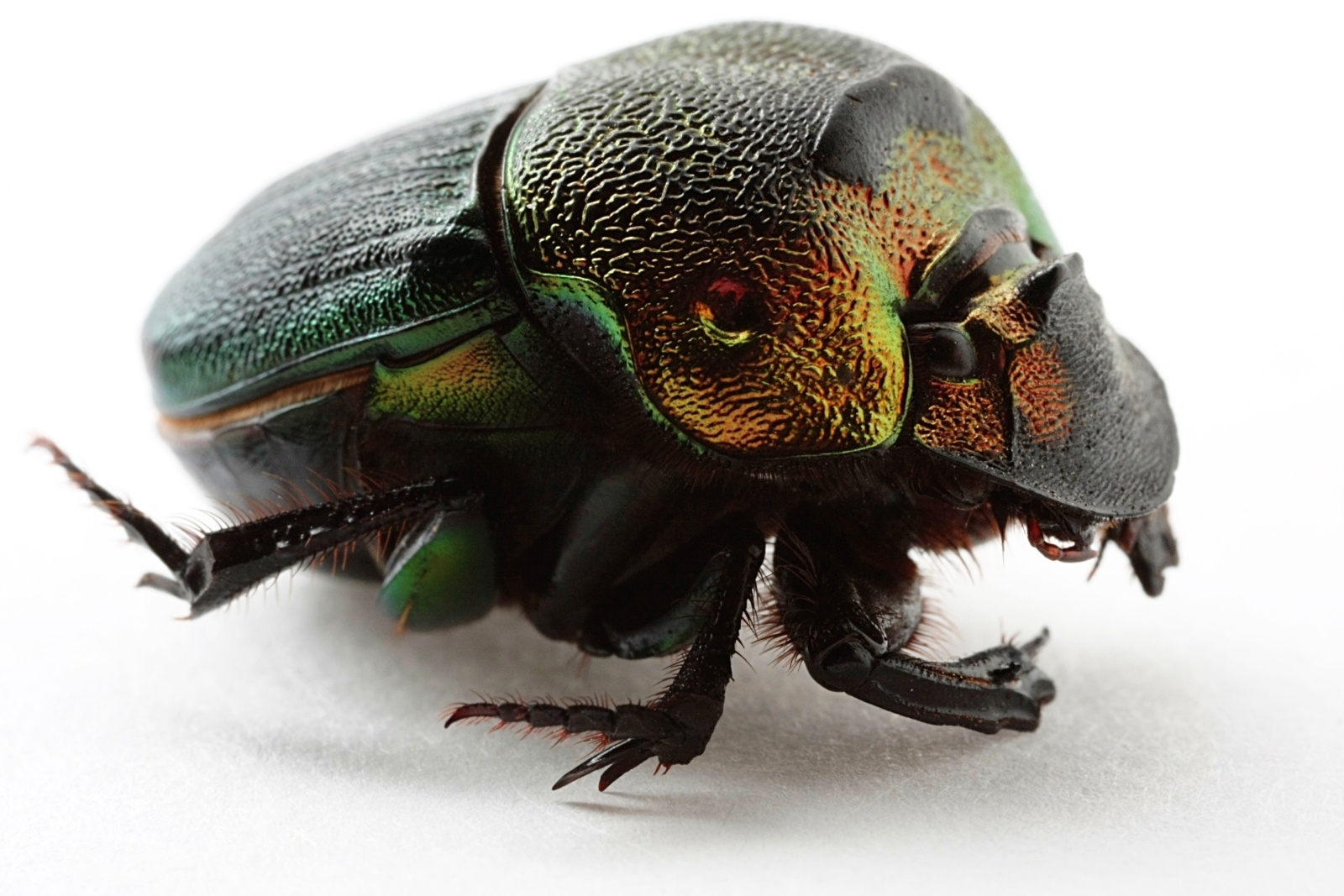

Scientific classification
- Kingdom: Animalia
- Phylum: Arthropoda
- Class: Insecta
- Order: Coleoptera
- Suborder: Polyphaga
- Infraorder: Scarabaeiformia
- Family: Scarabaeidae
- Genus: Phanaeus
- Species: P. igneus

Binomial name
- Phanaeus igneus Macleay, 1819

Synonyms
- Phanaeus floridanus DOlsoufieff, 1924

= Phanaeus igneus =

Species of beetle

Phanaeus igneus is a species of dung beetle in the family Scarabaeidae.

== Subspecies ==
These two subspecies belong to the species Phanaeus igneus:

- Phanaeus igneus floridanus Olsoufieff, 1924^{c g}
- Phanaeus igneus igneus^{g}

Data sources: i = ITIS, c = Catalogue of Life, g = GBIF, b = Bugguide.net
