= Tumeremo =

- Town
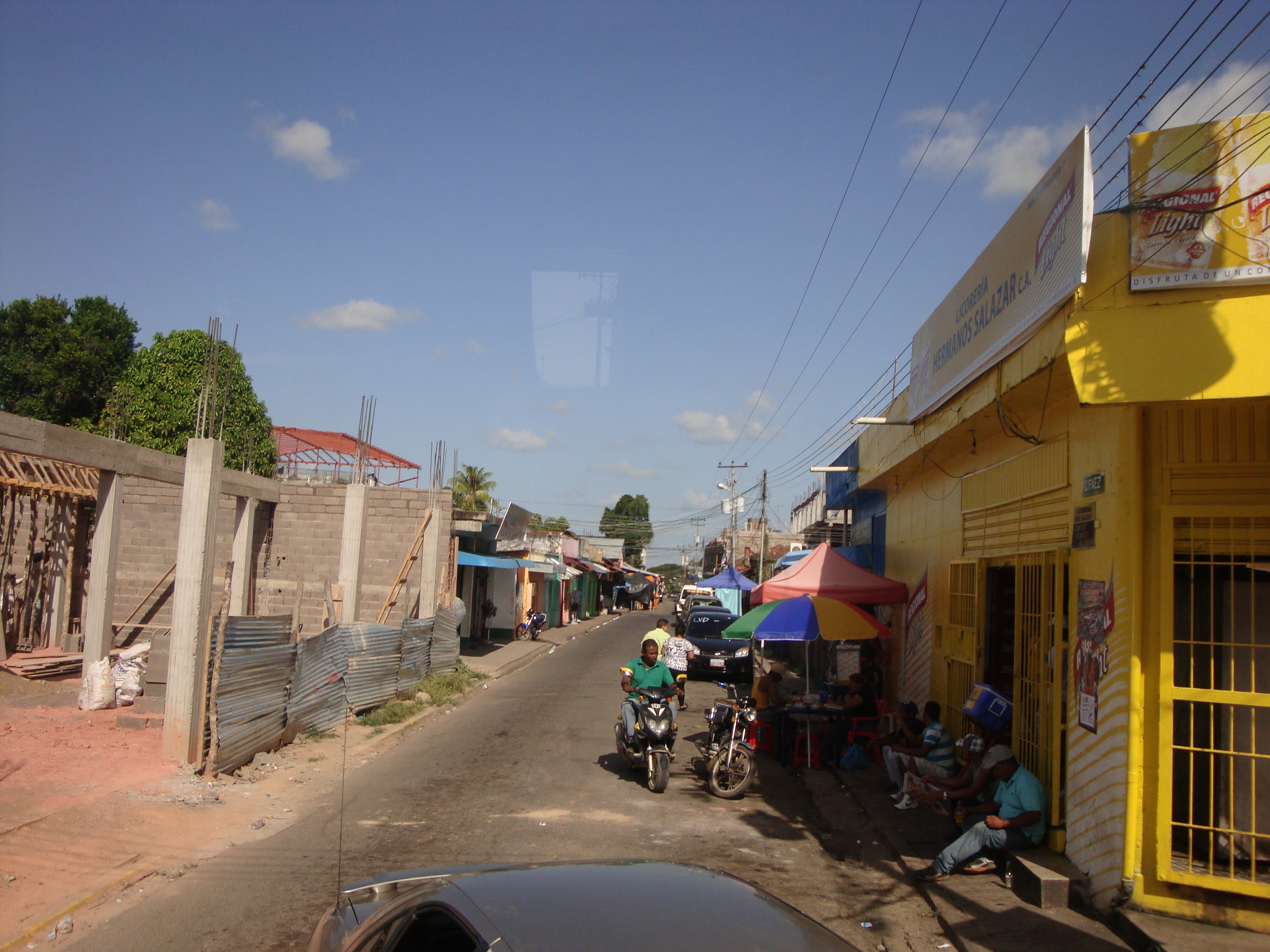

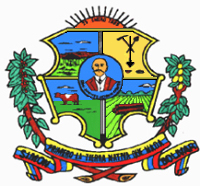
- Coat of arms

- Location in Venezuela
- Coordinates: 7°17′59″N 61°30′29″W
- Country: Venezuela
- State: Bolívar
- Municipality: Sifontes

Population (2019)
  - Total: 35,700
- Time zone: UTC−4 (VET)
- Postal code: 8057
- Dial plan: 0288

Tumeremo is a town in the state of Bolívar in eastern Venezuela. It is the shire town of the Sifontes Municipality, and the administrative center of asserting Venezuela's claim over the disputed Guayana Essequiba region.

== History ==
Its first settlers were Guayan Indians and Kamaracotos, coming from the savanna of the Divina Pastora and Tupuquen located to the left margin of the river Yuruari. They fed on hunting, fishing, and agriculture. Tumeremo was founded on January 26, 1788 under the name of "Mission of Our Lady of Bethlehem of Tumeremo" by the Capuchin monks of Catalonia, among them: Fray Mariano de Perafita, Fray Bonaventura de Carrocera, Fray Joaquín María de Martorell, Fray Ramón Pruna and Fray Tomas de Santa Eugenia. Tumeremo means "Painted Snake", in the dialect of the first Indians who inhabited those lands. The friars establish several missions and an agricultural emporium based on livestock and cotton cultivation.

During the Campaign of Guayana, General Manuel Piar fought against the realists to seize the missions of Spain. After releasing Tumeremo, the Spanish survivors were imprisoned and sentenced to death. From there, the city was a strategic site and barracks for the patriot soldiers commanded by Simón Bolívar. From 1830 many indigenous and other populations began to emerge around Tumeremo.

In 1894, a group of British settlers who came from British Guiana tried to establish themselves in what is now Sifontes Municipality. General Domingo Antonio Sifontes claimed the area on 2 March 1894 near El Dorado, where Venezuela established a military position. After expelling the settlers from the area, Sifontes became a local hero to Venezuelans in the area.

== Climate ==
Tumeremo has a tropical monsoon climate (Köppen: Am) marked by relatively consistent temperatures throughout the year and distinct wet and dry seasons. Tumeremo has a wet season from May to August, while February to April are relatively dry.

Climate data for Tumeremo (1991–2020)
Month	Jan	Feb	Mar	Apr	May	Jun	Jul	Aug	Sep	Oct	Nov	Dec	Year
Record high °C (°F)	35.3 (95.5)	38.2 (100.8)	39.6 (103.3)	37.9 (100.2)	35.9 (96.6)	38.0 (100.4)	37.7 (99.9)	35.4 (95.7)	35.9 (96.6)	38.2 (100.8)	37.7 (99.9)	35.6 (96.1)	39.6 (103.3)
Mean daily maximum °C (°F)	30.7 (87.3)	32.1 (89.8)	33.0 (91.4)	33.8 (92.8)	32.2 (90.0)	30.7 (87.3)	30.6 (87.1)	31.3 (88.3)	32.2 (90.0)	32.6 (90.7)	31.7 (89.1)	30.7 (87.3)	31.8 (89.2)
Daily mean °C (°F)	24.0 (75.2)	24.9 (76.8)	25.5 (77.9)	26.6 (79.9)	25.4 (77.7)	24.6 (76.3)	24.3 (75.7)	24.7 (76.5)	25.6 (78.1)	25.7 (78.3)	25.3 (77.5)	24.2 (75.6)	25.1 (77.2)
Mean daily minimum °C (°F)	21.5 (70.7)	21.7 (71.1)	22.1 (71.8)	22.9 (73.2)	22.7 (72.9)	22.5 (72.5)	22.1 (71.8)	22.1 (71.8)	22.5 (72.5)	22.7 (72.9)	22.7 (72.9)	21.9 (71.4)	22.3 (72.1)
Record low °C (°F)	15.5 (59.9)	16.8 (62.2)	14.5 (58.1)	17.6 (63.7)	17.3 (63.1)	16.6 (61.9)	18.3 (64.9)	12.7 (54.9)	17.0 (62.6)	17.4 (63.3)	18.7 (65.7)	17.2 (63.0)	12.7 (54.9)
Average precipitation mm (inches)	102.1 (4.02)	61.0 (2.40)	47.3 (1.86)	73.9 (2.91)	199.7 (7.86)	289.1 (11.38)	238.0 (9.37)	204.9 (8.07)	110.3 (4.34)	100.6 (3.96)	148.3 (5.84)	135.5 (5.33)	1,710.7 (67.35)
Average precipitation days (≥ 1.0 mm)	12.1	8.1	6.1	6.9	13.8	19.7	18.0	13.5	7.8	8.8	11.2	13.9	139.9
Source: NOAA

== See also ==
- Tumeremo massacre
