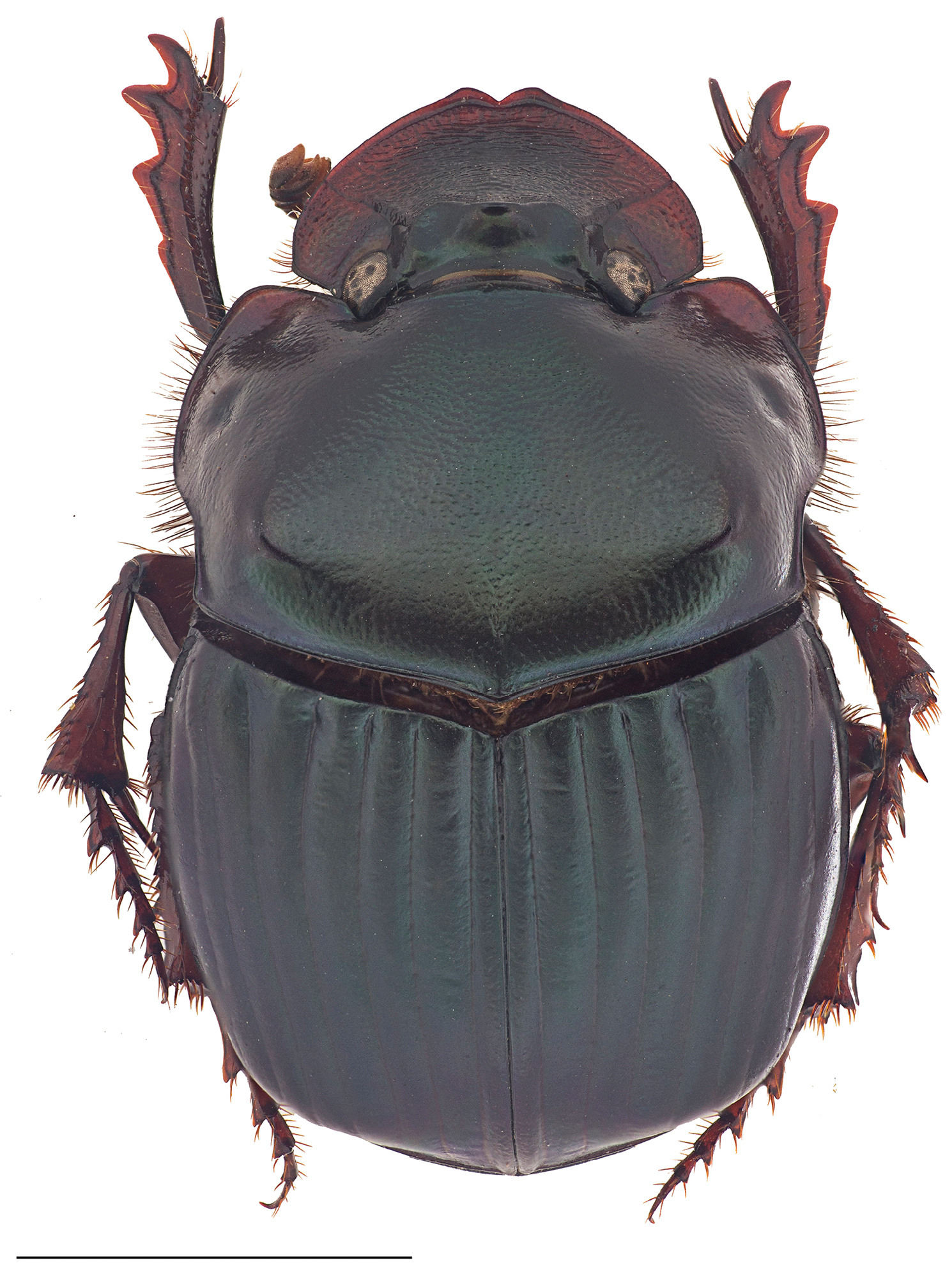

Scientific classification
- Domain: Eukaryota
- Kingdom: Animalia
- Phylum: Arthropoda
- Class: Insecta
- Order: Coleoptera
- Suborder: Polyphaga
- Infraorder: Scarabaeiformia
- Family: Scarabaeidae
- Genus: Phanaeus
- Species: P. dionysius

Binomial name
- Phanaeus dionysius Kohlmann, Arriaga-Jiménez, Rös, 2018

= Phanaeus dionysius =

Species of beetle

Phanaeus dionysius is a species of dung beetle in the family Scarabaeidae. It is found in region of San Pablo Etla of Oaxaca, Mexico.

== Etymology ==
The specific name dionysius is named after Dionysius II of Syracuse, main character of moral anecdote of the “Sword of Damocles”.

== Description ==
Length of male is 16.5 mm. Body dull shiny black with a faint blue luster. Pronotum with large, flat triangular disk. Slender, long horn strongly curved. Pygidium black. Length of female is 16.3 mm. Body dull shiny black.
