= Tumeremo massacre =

Tumeremo massacre typically refers to the following massacres in Tumeremo, Venezuela:

- 2016 Tumeremo massacre
- October 2018 Tumeremo massacre
