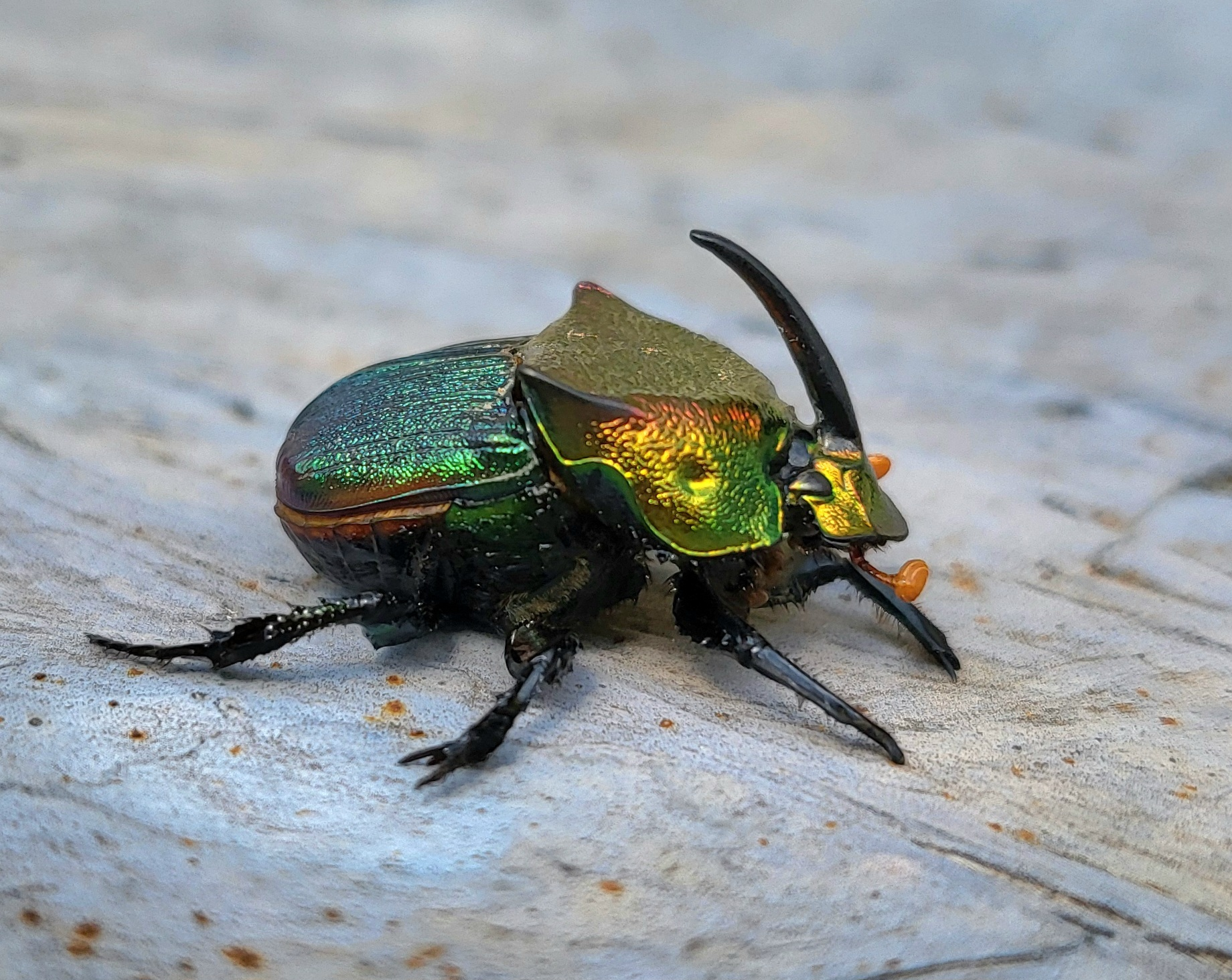
- Male Phanaeus vindex

Scientific classification
- Kingdom: Animalia
- Phylum: Arthropoda
- Clade: Pancrustacea
- Class: Insecta
- Order: Coleoptera
- Suborder: Polyphaga
- Infraorder: Scarabaeiformia
- Family: Scarabaeidae
- Tribe: Phanaeini
- Genus: Phanaeus; MacLeay, 1819

= Phanaeus (beetle) =

Genus of beetles

Phanaeus, the rainbow scarabs, is a genus of true dung beetles in the family Scarabaeidae (scarab beetles), ranging from the United States to northern Argentina, with the highest species richness in Mexico. Depending on species, they can inhabit a wide range of habitats, from tropical to temperate climates and deserts to rainforests. In those living in relatively arid places adults are primarily active during the wet season and those living in relatively cold places are primarily active during the summer. They are excellent diggers and good fliers.

They are up to about 2.5 cm (1 in) long and most (but not all) species have bright metallic colors with males having a horn on their head and/or one or two spikes on the pronotum. Males of several species occur in two distinct morphs, referred to as "major" and "minor", that differ in body size and size/presence of horn/spikes.

== Behavior ==
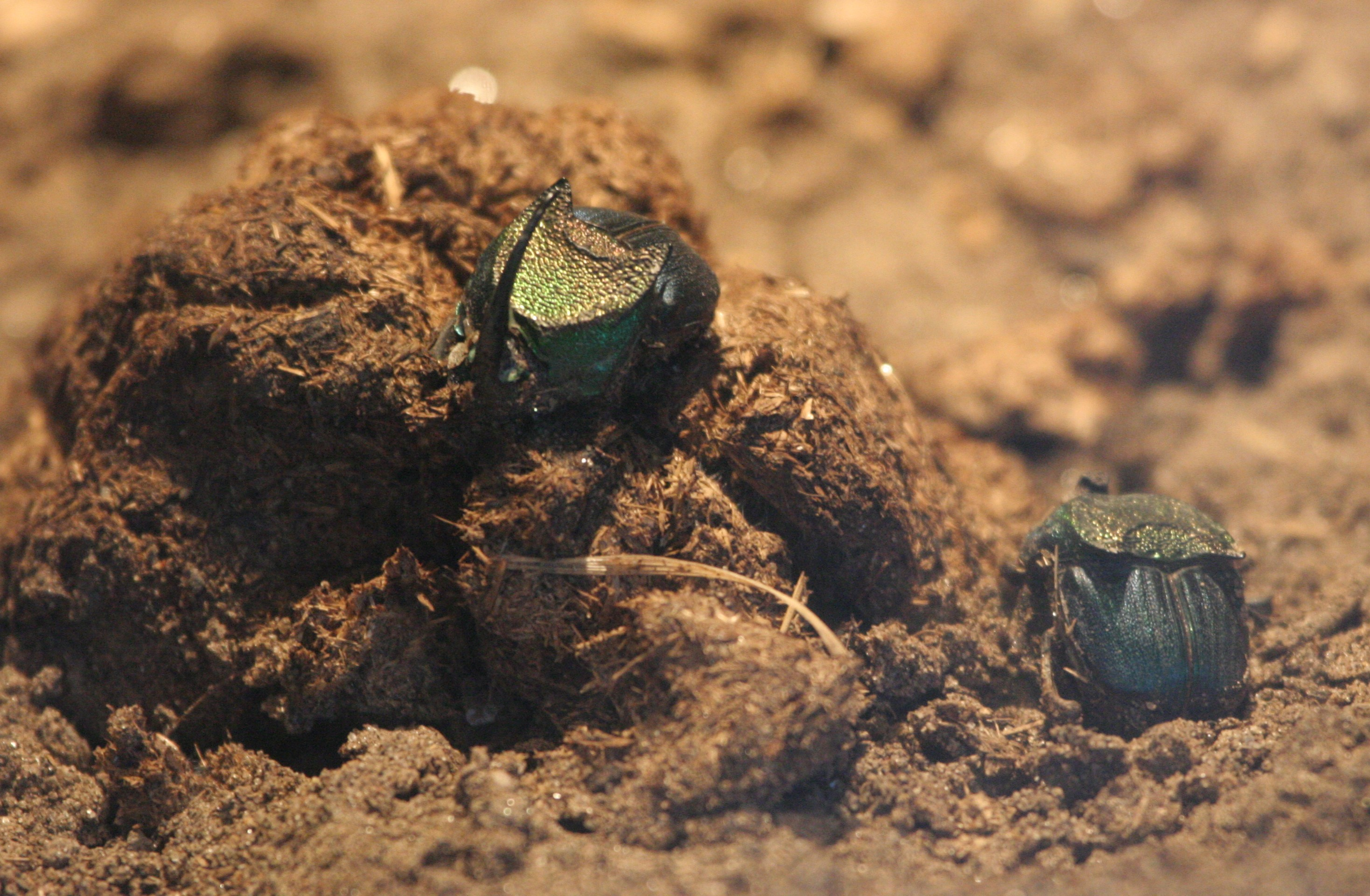
Phanaeus difformis pair (female below right) at dung in Rosamond Gifford Zoo, United States

Both adult and young of Phanaeus are generally coprophagous, feeding primarily on dung from a wide range of mammals, but they tend to prefer wet, as opposed to dry, dung. A pair of Phanaeus will tunnel in the soil below the dung to make nests where some of the dung is placed and the eggs are laid (each egg having its own, typically pear-shaped piece of dung). This means that they are paracoprids, as opposed to some other dung beetles that dig into or on the underside of the dung (the endocoprids) or roll dung balls overland to a tunnel elsewhere (the telecoprids); however, Phanaeus may on occasion roll or push a piece of dung some distance overland from where it was dropped to a tunnel. Because they bring the dung underground, tunneling species like Phanaeus are particularly useful for dung degradation. After the eggs have been laid the parents provides no further care for them. The development from egg to adult typically lasts a few months and adult beetles have lived for more than a year in captivity, but their lifespan is probably shorter in the wild. A tunnel with dung also serves as a temporary living quarter for a single adult or a pair and is only left once the food supply is exhausted or inedible; adults of some species will overwinter in their tunnel.

Exceptions are two South American species, P. bispinus and P. meleagris, that are mostly necrophagous (certain other species may be both coprophagous and necrophagous), and the Mexican P. halffterorum that appears to be mycetophagous.

In species with clearly distinct male morphs, either will pair up with a female to excavate a tunnel, but during male-male encounters a battle ensues with the major morph winning over the minor morph. Females may also fight other females over a piece of dung. In certain species where males vary clinally in appearance (no discrete morphs), like P. difformis, small and hornless "sneaky" males that mate by stealth exist.

== Species ==
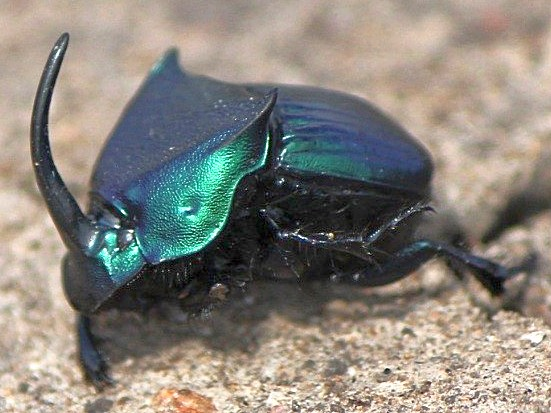
Male Phanaeus adonis is found in Mexico (also ranging into far southern Texas), like almost half the species in the genus

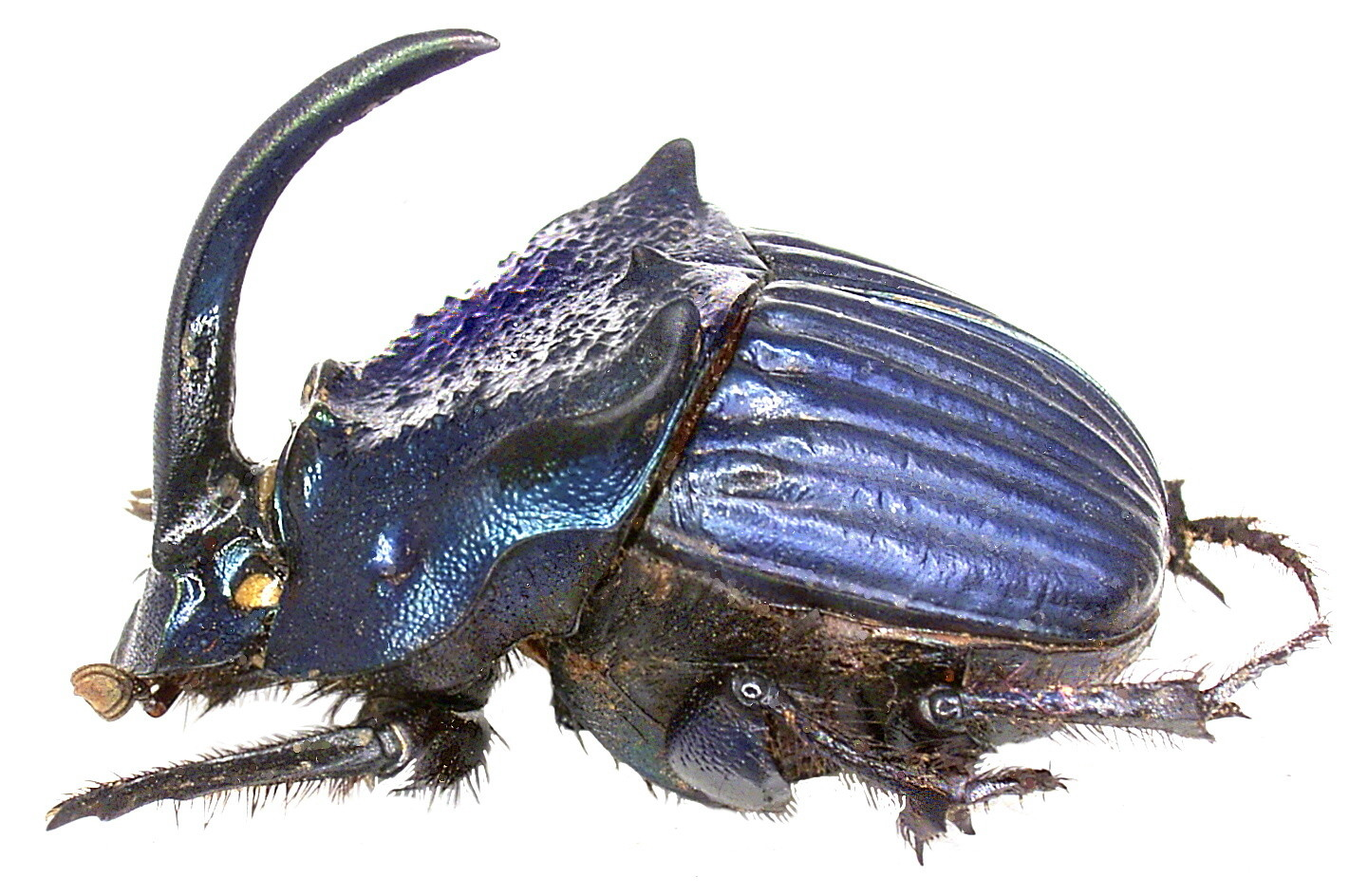
Male Phanaeus amethystinus showing its iridescent blue color and horn on the head

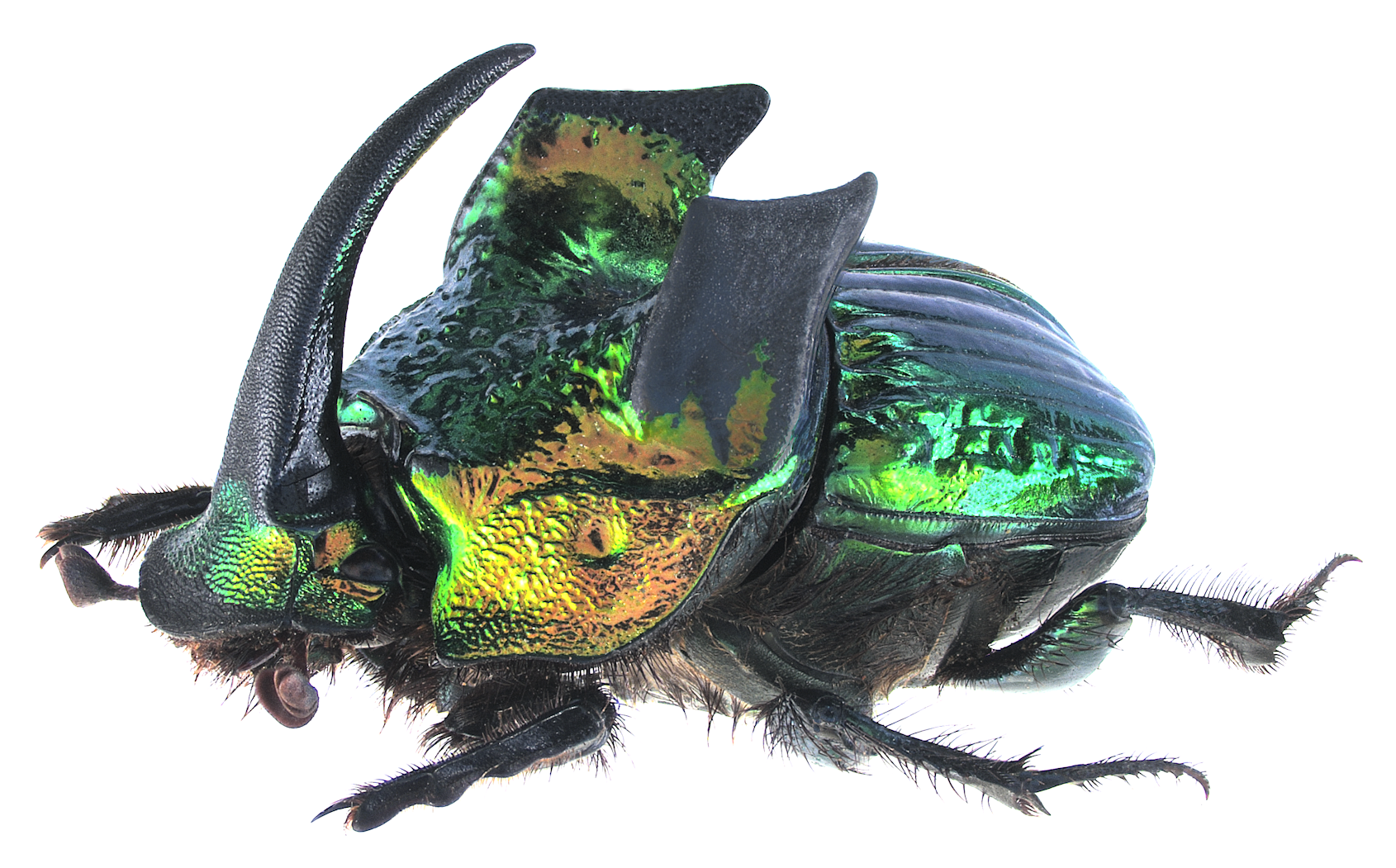
Male Phanaeus demon

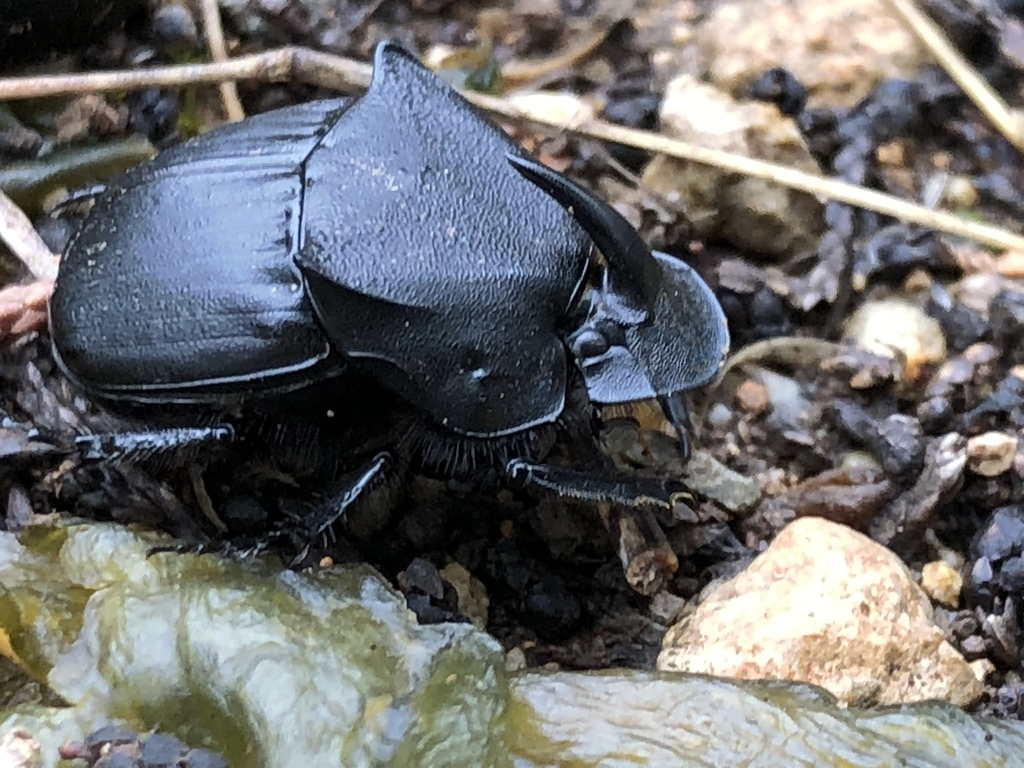
Male Phanaeus triangularis texensis, which often is considered its own species

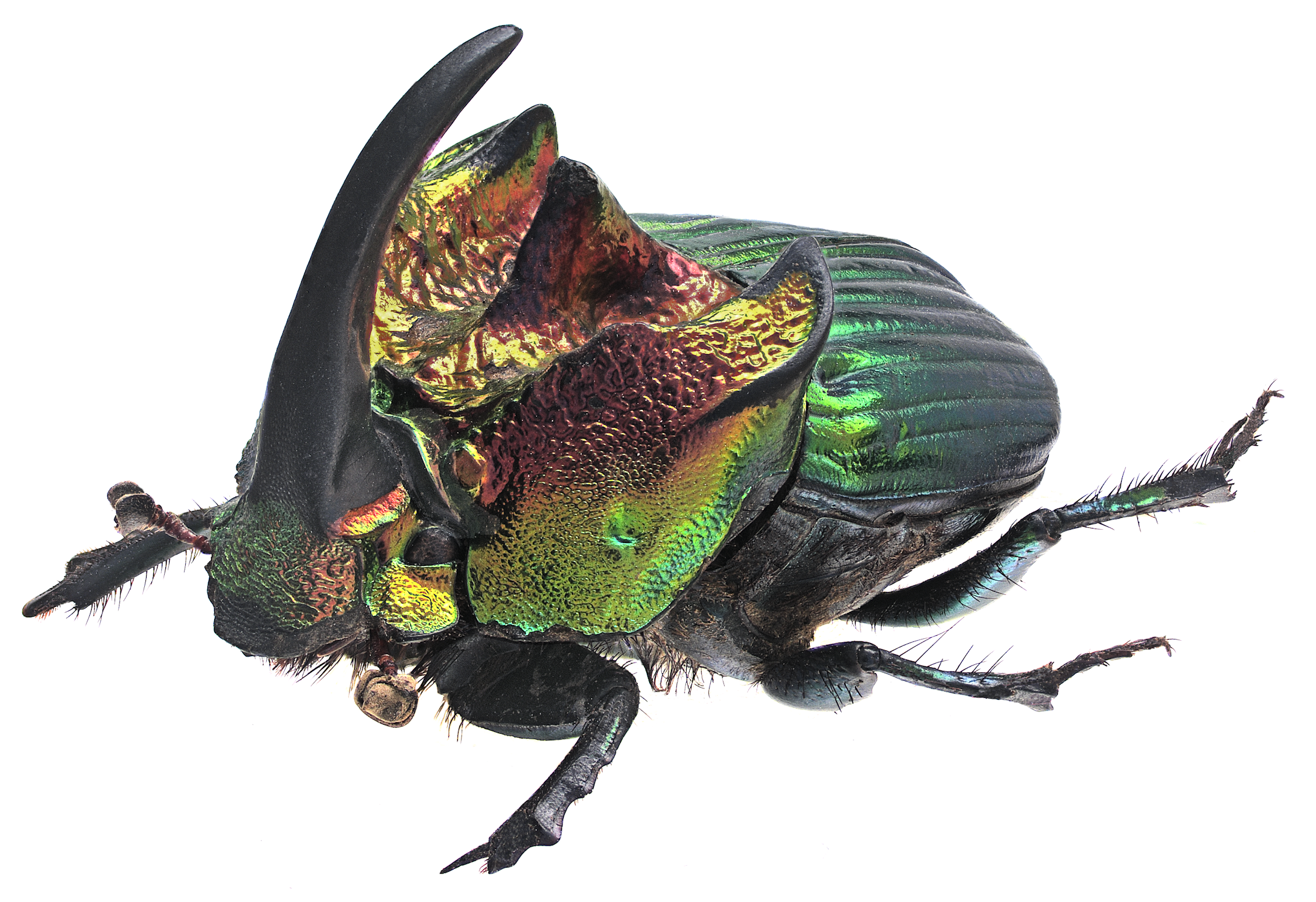
Male Phanaeus tridens moroni

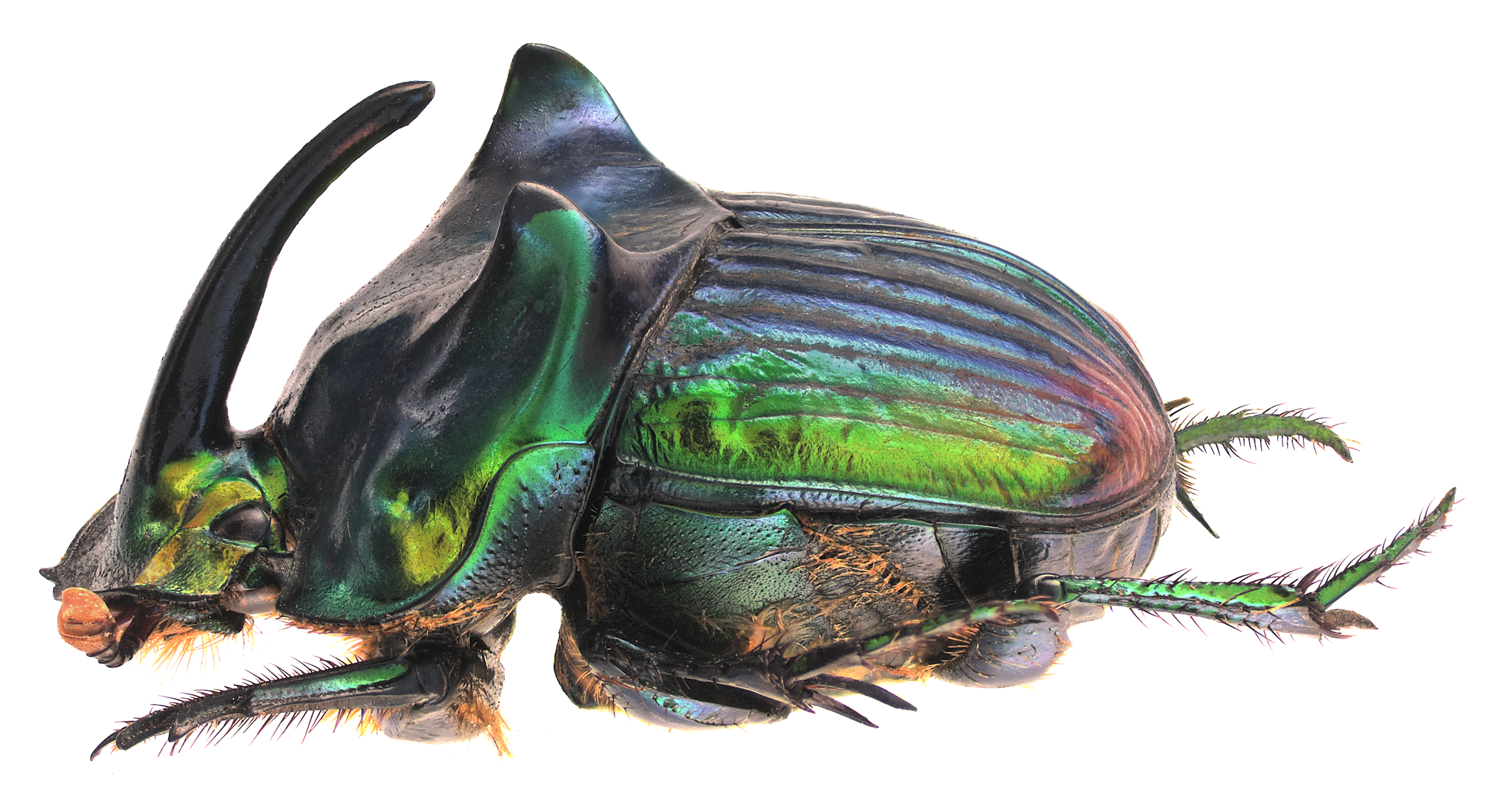
Male Phanaeus palaeno

Phanaeus includes the following species:

- Phanaeus achilles
- Phanaeus adonis
- Phanaeus alvarengai
- Phanaeus amethystinus
- Phanaeus amithaon
- †Phanaeus antiquus (fossil species, Pleistocene)
- †Phanaeus violetae (fossil species, Pleistocene)
- Phanaeus beltianus
- Phanaeus bispinus
- Phanaeus blackalleri
- Phanaeus bordoni
- Phanaeus cambeforti
- Phanaeus chalcomelas
- Phanaeus changdiazi
- Phanaeus damocles
- Phanaeus daphnis
- Phanaeus dejeani
- Phanaeus demon
- Phanaeus difformis
- Phanaeus dionysius
- Phanaeus dzidoi
- Phanaeus endymion
- Phanaeus eximius
- Phanaeus flohri
- Phanaeus furiosus
- Phanaeus genieri
- Phanaeus halffterorum
- Phanaeus haroldi
- Phanaeus hermes
- Phanaeus howdeni
- Phanaeus igneus
- Phanaeus kirbyi
- †Phanaeus labreae (fossil species, Pleistocene)
- Phanaeus lecourti
- Phanaeus lunaris
- Phanaeus malyi
- Phanaeus martinezorum
- Phanaeus melampus
- Phanaeus meleagris
- Phanaeus melibaeus
- Phanaeus mexicanus
- Phanaeus nimrod
- Phanaeus palaeno
- Phanaeus palliatus
- Phanaeus prasinus
- Phanaeus pyrois
- Phanaeus quadridens
- Phanaeus sallei
- Phanaeus scutifer
- Phanaeus splendidulus
- Phanaeus triangularis
- Phanaeus tridens
- Phanaeus wagneri
- Phanaeus vindex - rainbow scarab
- Phanaeus viridicollis
- Phanaeus yecoraensis
- Phanaeus zapotecus
