= List of massacres in Venezuela =

The following is a list of massacres that have occurred in Venezuela (numbers may be approximate):

Name	Date	Location	Deaths	Notes
Night of the Machetes	1913	Amazonas state	65-400	
El Corozo massacre	1942, 18 February	El Corozo village, Trujillo state	12	50-year-old farmer Gregorio Cáceres kills eleven people and seriously injured four others with an ax and a knife in El Corozo, a village in Trujillo, in addition to killing several animals and then escaping in the jungle, but ended up being tracked down and shot dead by police
Cantaura massacre	1982, 4 October	Cantaura, Anzoátegui state	23	Guerilla fighters killed.
Yumare massacre	1986, 8 May	Yaracuy state	9	Massacre of members of the subversive group Punto Cero by the DISIP.
Massacre of El Amparo	1988, 29 October	El Amparo, Apure state	14	Massacre of fishermen near the village of El Amparo.
Caracazo	1989, February–March	Venezuela	277–5,000	A week of unrest in response to controversial economic liberalization policies proposed Carlos Andrés Pérez that led him to implement Plan Ávila
Retén de Catia massacre	1992, 27 November	Retén de Catia, Caracas	63–200+	Massacre by the National Guard and the Metropolitan Police of prison inmates during the second 1992 Venezuelan coup d'état attempt
1994 Sabaneta fire	1994, 3 January	Maracaibo, Zulia	108	least 108 inmates died in a riot followed by Fire
Cararabo massacre	1995, 25 February	Frontier with the Vichada Department, Colombia	8	Venezuelan soldiers in a border garrison were killed by an ELN guerrillas commanded by a Venezuelan National Guard deserter.
San Román Tragedy	1995, 23 June	Caracas	5	Hostage crisis. Eight wounded.
La Planta massacre	1996, 22 October	Caracas	29	at least 29 inmates were burned to death in La Planta prison in Caracas, after members of the Guardia Nacional (GN), locked them into an overcrowded cell and threw tear-gas canisters into it, which set it on fire.
Llaguno Overpass events (El Silencio massacre)	2002, 11 April	Caracas	19	Shootout between the Metropolitan Police and pro-government gunmen during an opposition march to the presidential Miraflores Palace.
2002 Plaza Altamira military shooting	2002, 6 December	Caracas	3	João de Gouveia, a Venezuelan-Portuguese citizen, opened fire on the military in Altamira Square, killing 3 people and leaving 29 wounded.
El Corozo massacre	1942, 18 February	El Corozo village, Trujillo state	12	50-year-old farmer Gregorio Cáceres kills eleven people and seriously injured four others with an ax and a knife in El Corozo, a village in Trujillo, in addition to killing several animals and then escaping in the jungle, but ended up being tracked down and shot dead by police
Kennedy massacre	2005, 27 November	Caracas	3	College students killed by police officers. Three wounded.
El 70 massacre	2009, 22 September	El Valle Parish, Caracas	10	Officers from the now defunct Caracas Metropolitan Police (PM) murdered ten young women identified as alleged members of a criminal gang that operated in different areas of the parish.
Los Maniceros massacre	2009, October	La Tala, Táchira state	11	Kidnapping of a Colombian amateur association football team.
Yare prison riot	2012, 20 August	Yare I prison complex, Miranda state	25	Armed prisoners in the Yare I prison complex, an overcrowded prison in Miranda state near Caracas, rioted. A shootout between two groups resulted in the deaths of 25 people, one of them a visitor
Uribana prison riot	2013, 25 January	Barquisimeto, Lara state	61	Prison riot. One hundred and twenty wounded.
Coro massacre	2013, 4 July	Coro, Falcón state	2	Shooting of the National Guard of a woman and her daughters. The mother and one of the daughters were killed, while the two remaining daughters were helped shortly afterwards.
Sabaneta massacre	2013, 16 September	Sabaneta, Zulia state	16	Gang violence in prison. Forty eight wounded.
Altagracia massacre	2014, 10 November	Altagracia de Orituco, Guárico state	11	Ambush by El Picure gang
2016 Tumeremo massacre	2016, 8 March	Tumeremo, Bolívar state	4	Disappearance of twenty eight miners. Twenty four miners remain missing.
El Valle massacre	2016, 21 March	Caracas	10	Gang violence. Fourteen wounded.
Barlovento massacre	2016, Late	Barlovento, Miranda state	12	Disappearance by a Operación Liberación del Pueblo operative. On 25 November common graves were found in the area by the CICPC.
Cariaco massacre	2016, 11 November	Cariaco, Sucre state	9	Massacre of fishermen. 3 wounded.
Amazonas Judicial Detention Center Massacre	2017, 15 August	Puerto Ayacucho, Amazonas state	39	At least 39 people died in a jail riot in Venezuela's southern state of Amazonas
El Junquito massacre	2018, 15 January	El Junquito	10	Rebel leader Óscar Alberto Pérez, six rebels and three officials killed.
August 2018 Tumeremo massacre	2018, 26 August	Tumeremo, Bolívar state	12+	
2018 Valencia, Venezuela fire	2018, 28 March	Valencia, Carabobo	69	a fire broke out during a prison riot in the cells at the Carabobo state police headquarters in Valencia, The fire killed at least 69 people and injured scores of others.
October 2018 Tumeremo massacre	2018, 14–16 October	Tumeremo, Bolívar state	7+	
Amazonas ambush	2018, November 4	Amazonas (Venezuelan state)	3	3 Venezuelan border guards were killed and 10 were wounded in a suspected ELN rebel attack
Acarigua prison riot	2019, 24 May	Acarigua, Portuguesa	29	At least 29 prisoners are killed during a prison riot in Acarigua
Kumarakapay massacre	2019, 22 February	San Francisco de Yuruaní, Bolívar (state)	11-25	Massacre of Pemon civilians by the Venezuelan Army. Part of the Pemon conflict.
Guanare prison riot	2020, 1 May	Guanare, Portuguesa state	47	A riot and attempted escape attempt leaves 47 dead and 75 injured in the Centro Penitenciario de los Llanos in Guanare
La Vega raid	2021, 8 January	Caracas	23	Police raid to take control of La Vega Parish, which was controlled by the El Loco gang.
