= El Amparo =

El Amparo may refer to:

- El Amparo, Apure, a town in Páez Municipality, Apure, Venezuela
  - Massacre of El Amparo, 1988
- El Amparo District, a district of the Los Chiles canton, Alajuela province, Costa Rica
- El Amparo (film), a 2016 film, based on the massacre
