= Presidency of Luis Herrera Campins =

President of Venezuela from 1979 to 1984

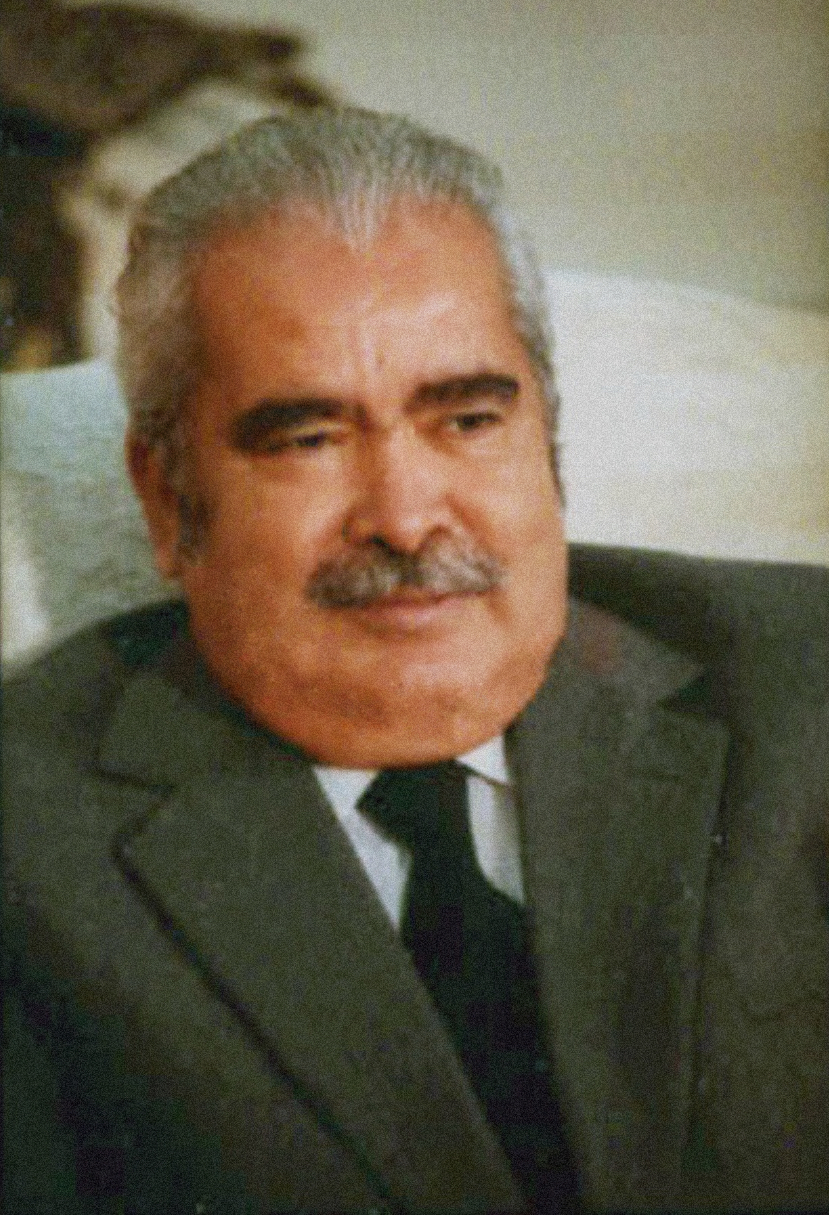
- Luis Herrera Campins c. 1981
- Presidency of Luis Herrera Campins; March 12, 1979 – February 2, 1984
- Cabinet: See list
- Party: Copei
- Election: 1978
- Seat: Miraflores Palace
- Presidential Standard

The Presidency of Luis Herrera Campins or the Campins Presidency or the Campins Administration was Luis Herrera Campins's tenure as the President of Venezuela, which lasted from 12 March 1979 to 2 February 1984. Prior to his election, he had founded the moderately conservative Christian COPEI party. He was succeeded by Jaime Lusinchi.

== Background ==
In the Republic of Venezuela, presidents and Congress were elected in the same election for five-year terms. At the 1978 election, AD fielded the unexciting Luis Piñerúa Ordaz and the COPEI selected Luis Herrera Campins.

Some observers believed that Venezuelans were ready to elect a leader who opposed the lavish expenditures of predecessor Carlos Andrés Pérez. Herrera Campins ran on the slogan "¡Basta!" ("Enough!") in reference to the spending levels at the time. The adecos were in a no-win situation disillusioned as they were with Pérez and unexcited by Piñerua, and Herrera defeated his Adeco adversary by a vote of 1,133,059 to 1,053,137. Venezuela had demonstrated once again that at the ballot level it was a working democracy.

== Cabinet (1979–1984) ==
Ministries
OFFICE	NAME	TERM
President	Luis Herrera Campins	1979–1984
Home Affairs	Rafael Montes de Oca	1979–1982
Home Affairs	Luciano Valero	1982–1984
External Affairs	José Alberto Zambrano Velasco	1979–1984
Finance	Luis Ugueto	1979–1982
Finance	Arturo Sosa	1982–1984
Defense	Fernando Paredes Bello	1979
Defense	Luis Rangel Burgoing	1979–1980
Defense	Tomás Abreu Rescaniere	1980–1981
Defense	Bernardo Leal Puchi	1981–1982
Defense	Vicente Narváez Churión	1982–1983
Defense	Humberto Alcalde Álvarez	1983–1984
Development	Manuel Quijada	1979–1981
Development	José Enrique Porras Omaña	1981–1984
Transport and Communications	Vinicio Carrera	1979–1983
Transport and Communications	Francisco Lara García	1983–1984
Education	Rafael Fernández Heres	1979–1982
Education	Felipe Montilla	1982–1984
Justice	José Guillermo Andueza	1979–1981
Justice	J. Reinaldo Chalbaud Zerpa	1981–1984
Mines and Oil	Humberto Calderón Berti	1979–1983
Mines and Oil	José Ignacio Moreno León	1983–1984
Environment	Vinicio Carrera	1979–1983
Environment	Francisco Lara García	1983–1984
Agriculture	Luciano Valero	1979–1981
Agriculture	José Luis Zapata Escalona	1981–1982
Agriculture	Nidia Villegas	1982–1984
Labor	Reinaldo Rodríguez Navarro	1979–1981
Labor	Rangel Quintero Castañeda	1981–1984
Health and Social Services	Alfonso Benzecri	1979–1981
Health and Social Services	Luis González Herrera	1981–1984
Urban Development	Orlando Orozco	1979–1982
Urban Development	María Cristina Maldonado	1982–1984
Information and Tourism	José Luis Zapata Escalona	1979–1981
Information and Tourism	Enrique Pérez Olivares	1981–1982
Information and Tourism	Guido Díaz Peña	1982–1984
Youth	Charles Brewer-Carías	1979–1982
Youth	Guillermo Yépez Boscán	1982–1984
Secretary to the Presidency	Ramón Guillermo Aveledo	1979–1984
Office of Planning and Coordination	Ricardo Martínez	1979–1982
Office of Planning and Coordination	Maritza Izaguirre	1982–1984

== Domestic policy ==
=== Legislative policy ===
Composition of the Senate (1978–1983): COPEI in green.

Composition of the Chamber of Deputies (1978–1983).

In 1982, a reform of the Civil Code of Venezuela was promoted.

=== Judicial policy ===
The government made efforts to achieve the pacification of guerrilla groups. In April 1979, President Herrera decided to suspend the proceedings against 20 detainees who were being tried for rebellion. Months later, the charges against Douglas Bravo, Carlos Betancourt, Fortunato Herrera, and other leaders were dropped.

=== Economics ===
At the start of Herrera Campins' term, Venezuela's economy was succeeding due to high oil revenues. However, it also faced extremely high foreign debt due to the effects of spending by the previous President, Carlos Andrés Pérez. During his campaign he pledged to reduce expenditures. He promised to other Latin American countries to supply them with oil. When oil prices fell in 1983, an economic depression began.

Few presidents had practiced winner-takes-all as Herrera Campins did. Even full-blooded Social Christians who had worked for the Pérez administration were fired. But Herrera did have in his cabinet a few figures that were not copeyanos, among them Manuel Quijada, the former anti-democracy conspirator. (Later, Quijada was one of the political advisors of Chavez before the former paratrooper won the presidency.) He named the economist Leopoldo Díaz Bruzual to the Venezuelan Central Bank. Díaz Bruzual was a protégé of and advisor to Reinaldo Cervini, a very rich man who had life-time tenure at Pro-Venezuela, a kind of semi-official institute founded to promote Venezuelan industrialization. Cervini doubled as Maecenas to communist intellectuals, who would physically confront anyone who dared criticize their patron. Herrera Campins toned down the showiness of his predecessor, even though his government had another windfall when oil prices rose dramatically again in 1983. Venezuela had increased its indebtedness beyond the levels attained by the Pérez government. There was much talk at the time of "bipolarity", the belief that Venezuela was stuck forever in the cycle of AD-COPEI ruling alternatively but following the same policies of high-spending, high-bureaucracy, and a statized economy.

When dollars flooded Venezuela again, economists began talking of "overheating", although it wasn't clear whether they knew what they were talking about. It was pseudo-technical jargon, but Díaz Bruzual was among the adherents to this idea, if not actually the economist who got the "overheated" ball rolling. In the USA, president Jimmy Carter was fighting inflationary pressures and interests rates there, and in the industrialized nations generally, went up to unheard of levels. In Venezuela, a Canadian bank was offering interests as high as 21%. But because of the overheating thesis, Díaz Bruzual applied an old law whereby interest payments above 12% were considered usurious and illegal. Dollars started flowing out of Venezuela in the billions, and the central bank, which had always been zealous about national reserves, took fright at their growing depletion, but instead of counter-acting with incentives to reverse the outward flow, the bolívar was officially devalued by over 50% on its previous 4.30 to the dollar. The government, in brief, was not going to subsidize the bolivar at its previous rate. But the measure encouraged a further massive flight of dollars, and the government then clamped full currency control.

=== Infrastructure ===
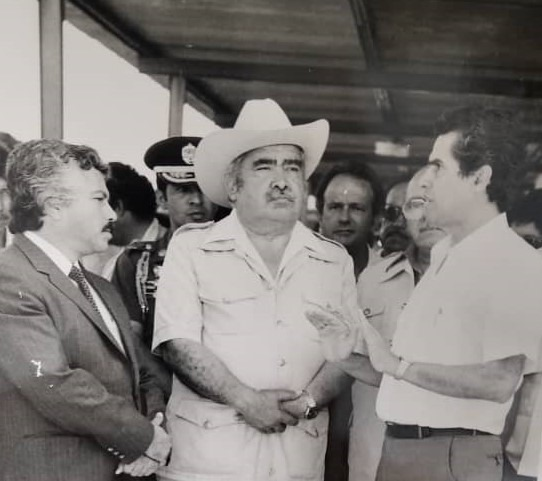
Inauguration of CAICET.

Among the works of his government were the inauguration of the Teresa Carreño Theater, the Parque Central Complex, the Estadio Brígido Iriarte, the Monument to the Virgin of Peace, and the Minor Basilica National Shrine of Our Lady of Coromoto. In February 1983, the Amazonian Center for Research and Control of Tropical Diseases Simón Bolívar (CAICET) was created.

In 1979 he approved the execution of the "National Railway Plan", which consisted of a direct railway line between Maracaibo and Ciudad Guayana, passing through Valencia, Caracas (Cúa), Barcelona, and Ciudad Bolívar. During his administration, the only section of this plan that has been completed began construction: the Caracas–Cúa line.

During his presidential term, important infrastructure works were completed, for example: the Parque Central Complex, the Teresa Carreño Theater, the first phase of Line 1 of the Caracas Metro, the Estadio Brígido Iriarte, the Naciones Unidas Park where the IX Pan American Games of 1983 were inaugurated in Caracas, the beginning of the Eastern Highway, the promotion of agriculture, the Monument to the Virgin of Peace, and the National Shrine of Our Lady of Coromoto, among others.

=== Education ===
He created the Ministry of State for the Development of Intelligence, headed by Luis Alberto Machado.

=== Media policy ===
He suppressed all audiovisual advertising on radio and television aimed at promoting the consumption of cigarettes and alcoholic beverages, a measure that in the long term reduced the incidence of smoking—and partly alcoholism—among the Venezuelan population (especially low-income sectors).

=== Alimentation ===
He authorized the distribution of Lactovisoy, a complementary nutritional formula for children, especially school-age children, containing soy protein, milk, precooked rice flour, vitamins, and minerals. The formula was created by Werner Jaffe. It is cheaper than milk and contains ingredients not found in it. Registered by the National Institute of Nutrition, it is easy to transport and package because it is a powdered product.

=== Communications policy ===
The government of Luis Herrera Campíns authorized color television in the country and, on 1 January 1981, prohibited and suppressed all audiovisual advertisements on radio and television intended to promote the consumption of cigarettes and alcoholic beverages. The country's largest media outlets boycotted President Campins because of this latter measure.

=== Human rights ===
On 29 June 1979, American businessman Willian Niehous, who had been kidnapped by guerrillas three years earlier, was released. During his rescue, according to some accounts, two of his captors were executed by members of the Technical Judicial Police, even though they had surrendered and were handcuffed.

During the Cantaura massacre, 23 guerrillas were killed in a joint operation between the army and the DISIP. Some of the dead guerrillas had been shot execution-style and were buried in a mass grave without the consent of their families. Under pressure from relatives and activists, the remains were exhumed and returned to their families.

Several organizations, such as the Comité Luto Activo, denounced the increase in violence by state security forces within the framework of Plan Unión, a public order control program. Cases of arbitrary detention, raids, abuse of authority, and extrajudicial executions were reported.

In 1980, the prefects of Caracas threatened to apply the Law on Vagrants and Criminals and "send homosexuals to El Dorado". Within the framework of Plan Unión, actions informally known as "Operation Butterflies" were carried out. In these operations, police forces conducted raids on bars and places frequented by sexually diverse people, leading to arbitrary detentions and abuses against the community, along with discriminatory and sensationalist treatment in the media.

On the other hand, activists and organizations dedicated themselves to reporting some cases of human rights violations. Since the 1980s, Father Acacio Belandria dedicated himself to supporting those displaced by the Colombian internal conflict, as well as denouncing the militarization of border towns and the actions of guerrilla groups. Meanwhile, the Haitian-Venezuelan Committee for the Defense of Human Rights (CDDH) organized a demonstration denouncing the refusal to treat Haitians at the General Hospital of the South in Maracaibo.

In 1983, a decree was published in the Official Gazette of Venezuela establishing the initiation of human rights education programs in secondary education, although it was never implemented.

== Foreign policy ==
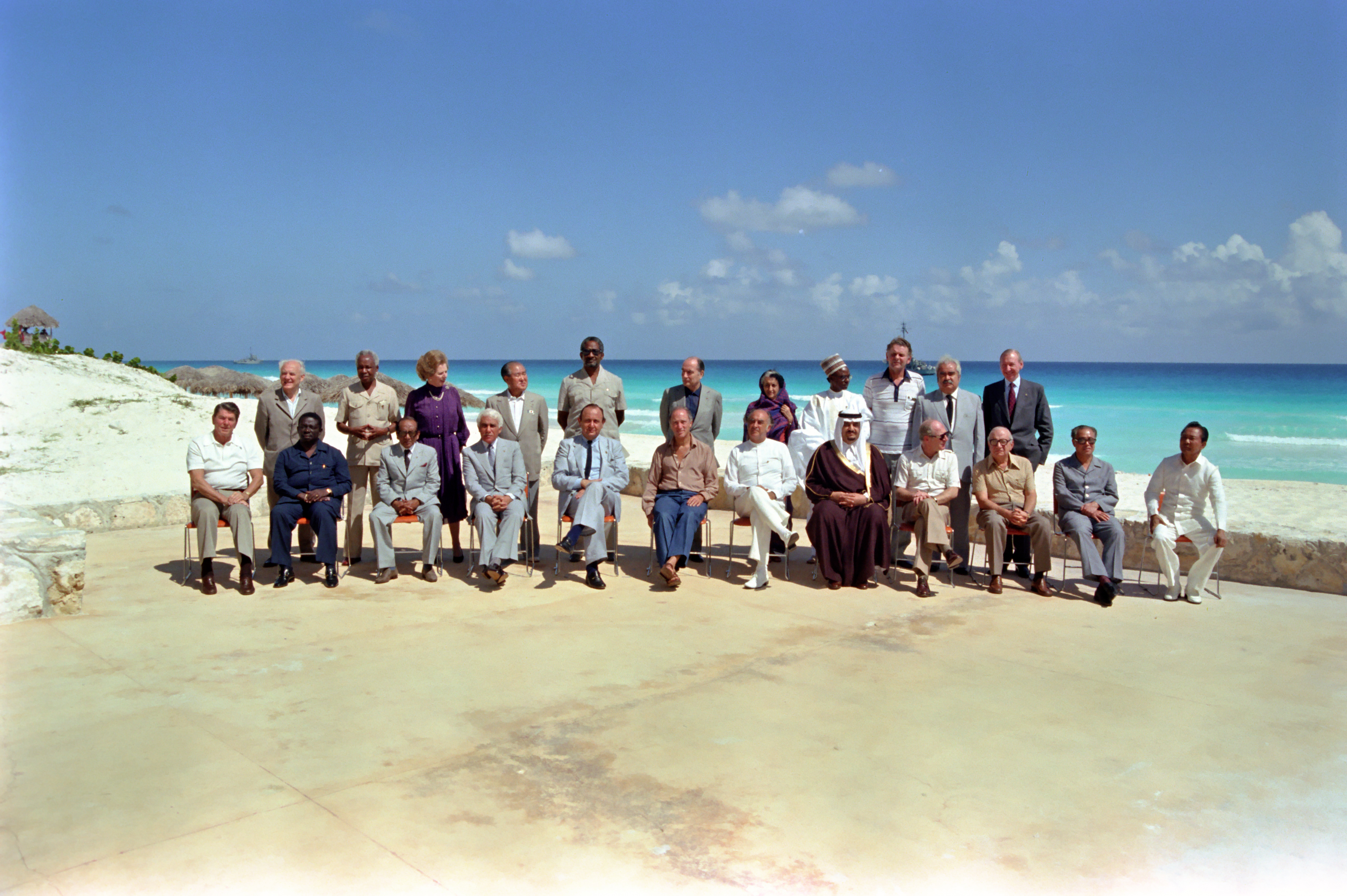
Meeting of heads of state at the North–South Summit in Cancún, Mexico, October 1981

Venezuela hosted the IX Pan American Games of 1983. Luis Herrera's support for Argentine military dictator and "dirty war" veteran Leopoldo Fortunato Galtieri during the Falklands War also stood out, officially though not materially, and he diplomatically backed the Argentine movement. His support for Argentina took place while affirming Venezuela's longstanding claim over the Essequibo Guyana, a former British colony. In accordance with that position, in 1982 it was decided not to renew the Protocol of Port of Spain signed with the United Kingdom and then-British Guiana in 1970.

On 3 August 1982, his government also recognized the Sahrawi Arab Democratic Republic as a sovereign state in the Western Sahara. In December 1982, PDVSA signed a cooperation agreement with the German oil company VEBA for the establishment of a joint venture called Ruhr Oel GmbH. This event is considered the beginning of the internationalization of PDVSA.

=== Plans ===
Luis Herrera Campíns attempted to have Venezuela enter the Non-Aligned Movement, but was vetoed by Guyana.

=== International trips ===
==== 1980 ====
Date	Location	Main purpose
14–17 April 1980	France	Official visit, including to the European Parliament.

==== 1981 ====
Date	Location	Main purpose
22–23 October 1981	Cancún, Mexico	North–South Summit.
16–19 November 1981	United States	Official visit.

==== 1983 ====
Date	Location	Main purpose
16–17 July 1983	Mexico	
18 December 1983	Bogotá, Colombia	Bolivarian summit of Latin American leaders. The joint declaration called on the international community to help achieve peace in Central America.

== Opposition ==
According to El Nacional, in 1983 there were 162 protests in Venezuela.

=== Cantaura massacre ===
In 1982, a military operation was carried out against a group of guerrillas from the "Américo Silva" Guerrilla Front of the Red Flag party near the city of Cantaura in Anzoátegui. The guerrilla camp was bombed, leaving 23 guerrillas dead in an event known as the Cantaura massacre.

== See also ==
- Viernes Negro
