= Fernando Amorebieta =

Venezuelan footballer (born 1985)

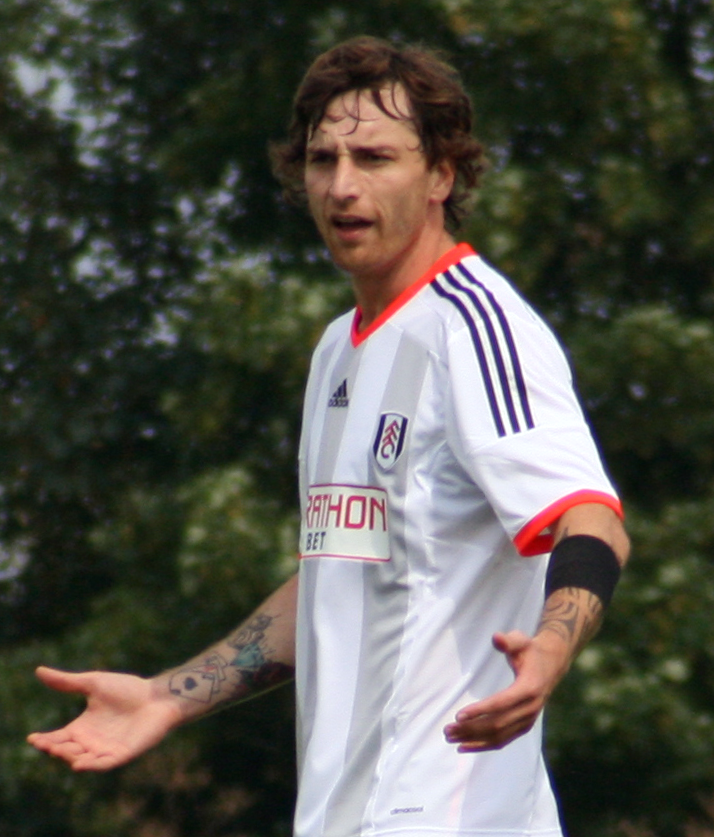
- Amorebieta in action for Fulham in 2014

Personal information
- Full name: Fernando Gabriel Amorebieta Mardaras
- Date of birth: 29 March 1985 (age 41)
- Place of birth: Cantaura, Venezuela
- Height: 1.92 m (6 ft 4 in)
- Position: Centre-back

Youth career
- 1995–1996: Colegio San Miguel
- 1996–2003: Athletic Bilbao

Senior career*
Years	Team	Apps	(Gls)
2003–2004	Basconia	26	(1)
2004–2005	Bilbao Athletic	35	(1)
2005–2013	Athletic Bilbao	195	(3)
2013–2016	Fulham	44	(2)
2015	→ Middlesbrough (loan)	4	(0)
2015–2016	→ Middlesbrough (loan)	13	(0)
2016–2017	Sporting Gijón	27	(0)
2017–2018	Independiente	11	(0)
2019–2020	Cerro Porteño	11	(0)
Total		366	(7)

International career
2004	Spain U19	4	(0)
2007–2011	Basque Country	4	(0)
2011–2015	Venezuela	15	(1)
Medal record
Men's football
Representing Spain
UEFA European Under-19 Championship
Winner	2004 Switzerland
- * Club domestic league appearances and goals

Fernando Gabriel Amorebieta Mardaras (born 29 March 1985) is a Venezuelan former professional footballer who played as a central defender.

He spent most of his career with Athletic Bilbao, appearing in 254 competitive matches over eight La Liga seasons and scoring four goals. He also competed professionally in England (with Fulham and Middlesbrough), Argentina and Paraguay.

Internationally, Amorebieta played for Spain (where he spent most of his early life) at youth level, but later decided to represent his country of birth Venezuela as a senior, appearing for the nation at the 2015 Copa América.

== Club career ==
=== Athletic Bilbao ===
Born in Cantaura, Pedro María Freites Municipality, Anzoátegui, Venezuela, Amorebieta joined Athletic Bilbao in 1996, aged 11; he met the club's eligibility standards having been raised in the Basque town of Iurreta and through his parents, both of whom hailed from the region. After progressing through the ranks – alongside Fernando Llorente– including CD Basconia (the farm team) and Bilbao Athletic (the reserves), he made his first-team debut in 2005–06, becoming first choice in the subsequent La Liga seasons.

Amorebieta played a total of 47 official matches in 2009–10, helping Athletic to reach the round of 32 in the UEFA Europa League as well as an eighth-place finish in the league; he collected 18 yellow cards in the process, being sent off twice.

Amorebieta began the 2012–13 campaign nursing a pubalgia ailment, and was later involved in a dispute over the extension of his contract.

=== Fulham ===
On 15 April 2013, Amorebieta signed a four-year deal with Fulham on a free transfer effective as of 1 July. The Premier League club officially announced him on 22 May, and he made his debut on 14 September, coming on as a substitute for Kieran Richardson in a 1–1 draw against West Bromwich Albion at Craven Cottage.

Amorebieta was sent off on 22 March 2014 for conceding a penalty with a foul on David Silva in an eventual 5–0 defeat at Manchester City. He scored his first goal in English football on 26 April, his team's second in an eventual 2–2 home draw with Hull City. He made 26 competitive appearances in his debut season, which ended with relegation.

On 6 March 2015, after returning from three months out injured, Amorebieta was sent off in Fulham's 5–1 home loss by AFC Bournemouth for bringing down Callum Wilson. On the 25th, he was loaned to fellow Championship side Middlesbrough until the end of the campaign, with left-back James Husband moving in the opposite direction. He scored his first goal for the latter on 8 May, replacing Lee Tomlin after 73 minutes and netting a last-minute winner for a 2–1 away win over Brentford in the play-off semi-finals; he was unused in the final at Wembley Stadium, a 2–0 defeat to Norwich City.

On 28 August 2015, Amorebieta returned to the Riverside Stadium for the entirety of the season, with Husband again being lent to Fulham for a month as part of the deal. On 1 February of the following year, however, he was recalled.

=== Sporting Gijón ===
Amorebieta returned to Spain and its top division on 22 July 2016, after agreeing to a three-year contract at Sporting de Gijón. He made his debut on 21 August, playing the full 90 minutes in a 2–1 home victory against former club Athletic.

=== Later years ===
On 10 July 2017, following Sporting's relegation, Amorebieta moved to Argentina and joined Club Atlético Independiente. In January 2019, the free agent agreed to a two-year deal at Cerro Porteño of the Paraguayan Primera División.

After retiring aged 35, Amorebieta worked as Club Portugalete's director of football. Subsequently, he was assistant manager to his former Athletic teammate Ibai Gómez at Santutxu FC's youths and Segunda Federación club Arenas Club de Getxo.

== International career ==
=== Spain ===
Amorebieta was part of the Spain under-19 team that won the UEFA European Championship in 2004. In August 2008, he was called up by new senior team manager Vicente del Bosque for a friendly against Denmark, but did not leave the bench.

=== Venezuela ===
As early as 2006, Amorebieta expressed his interest in playing for the Venezuela national team. However, according to FIFA rules at the time, he should have switched his affiliation prior to the age of 21, having previously played for Spain's youth sides; FIFA removed the rule in 2009, and talks between the player and the Venezuelan Football Federation resumed.

Finally, on 2 September 2011, Amorebieta made his senior debut in a friendly with Argentina, a 1–0 loss in Kolkata. On 11 October, against the same opponent but for the 2014 FIFA World Cup qualifying campaign, he scored in a 1–0 home win, which signified Venezuela's first-ever win against the Albiceleste in the tournament.

Amorebieta was included in the squad for the 2015 Copa América, where he was sent off in the team's 1–0 defeat to Peru in the group stage for a stamp on Paolo Guerrero. He retired from international football that November.

=== Basque Country ===
Amorebieta also appeared in four matches for the Basque Country national team (a non-FIFA affiliate), debuting against Venezuela in San Cristóbal, Táchira on 20 June 2007. The friendly match, a 4–3 Basque victory, was the grand opening for the 43,000 all-seated Pueblo Nuevo Stadium, after two years of construction for the 2007 Copa América.

== Career statistics ==
=== Club ===
Appearances and goals by club, season and competition
Club	Season	League			Cup		Continental		Other (Note: Includes Supercopa de España, UEFA Super Cup, English Football League play-offs, FIFA Club World Cup.)		Total	
Club	Season	Division	Apps	Goals	Apps	Goals	Apps	Goals	Apps	Goals	Apps	Goals
Basconia	2003–04	Tercera División	26	1	–		–		–		26	1
Bilbao Athletic	2004–05	Segunda División B	24	1	–		–		–		24	1
Bilbao Athletic	2005–06	Segunda División B	11	0	–		–		–		11	0
Bilbao Athletic	Total		35	1	–		–		–		35	1
Athletic Bilbao	2005–06	La Liga	15	0	2	0	2	0	0	0	19	0
Athletic Bilbao	2006–07	La Liga	27	0	1	0	–		–		28	0
Athletic Bilbao	2007–08	La Liga	34	0	6	1	–		–		40	1
Athletic Bilbao	2008–09	La Liga	29	0	7	0	–		–		36	0
Athletic Bilbao	2009–10	La Liga	34	0	2	0	11	0	0	0	47	0
Athletic Bilbao	2010–11	La Liga	17	0	0	0	–		–		17	0
Athletic Bilbao	2011–12	La Liga	28	3	8	0	14	0	–		50	3
Athletic Bilbao	2012–13	La Liga	11	0	2	0	4	0	–		17	0
Athletic Bilbao	Total		195	3	28	1	31	0	0	0	254	4
Fulham	2013–14	Premier League	23	1	3	0	–		0	0	26	1
Fulham	2014–15	Championship	7	1	1	0	–		0	0	8	1
Fulham	2015–16	Championship	14	0	0	0	–		0	0	14	0
Fulham	Total		44	2	4	0	0	0	0	0	48	2
Middlesbrough (loan)	2014–15	Championship	4	0	0	0	–		1	1	5	1
Middlesbrough (loan)	2015–16	Championship	13	0	3	0	–		0	0	16	0
Middlesbrough (loan)	Total		17	0	3	0	0	0	1	1	21	1
Sporting Gijón	2016–17	La Liga	27	0	0	0	–				27	0
Independiente	2017–18	Argentine Primera División	11	0	0	0	11	0	0	0	22	0
Cerro Porteño	2019	Paraguayan Primera División	8	0	0	0	7	0	0	0	15	0
Cerro Porteño	2020	Paraguayan Primera División	3	0	0	0	3	0	0	0	6	0
Cerro Porteño	Total		11	0	0	0	10	0	0	0	21	0
Career total			366	7	35	1	52	0	1	1	454	9

=== International goals ===
Scores and results list Venezuela's goal tally first, score column indicates score after each Amorebieta goal.

List of international goals scored by Fernando Amorebieta
No.	Date	Venue	Opponent	Score	Result	Competition
1	11 October 2011	José Antonio Anzoátegui, Puerto La Cruz, Venezuela	Argentina	1–0	1–0	2014 FIFA World Cup qualification

== Honours ==
Athletic Bilbao

- Copa del Rey runner-up: 2008–09, 2011–12
- Supercopa de España runner-up: 2009
- UEFA Europa League runner-up: 2011–12

Independiente

- Copa Sudamericana: 2017

Spain U19

- UEFA European Under-19 Championship: 2004

== See also ==
- List of sportspeople who competed for more than one nation
