= El Cocuy National Park =

National park in Colombia

- Parque Nacional Natural El Cocuy
- IUCN category II (national park)
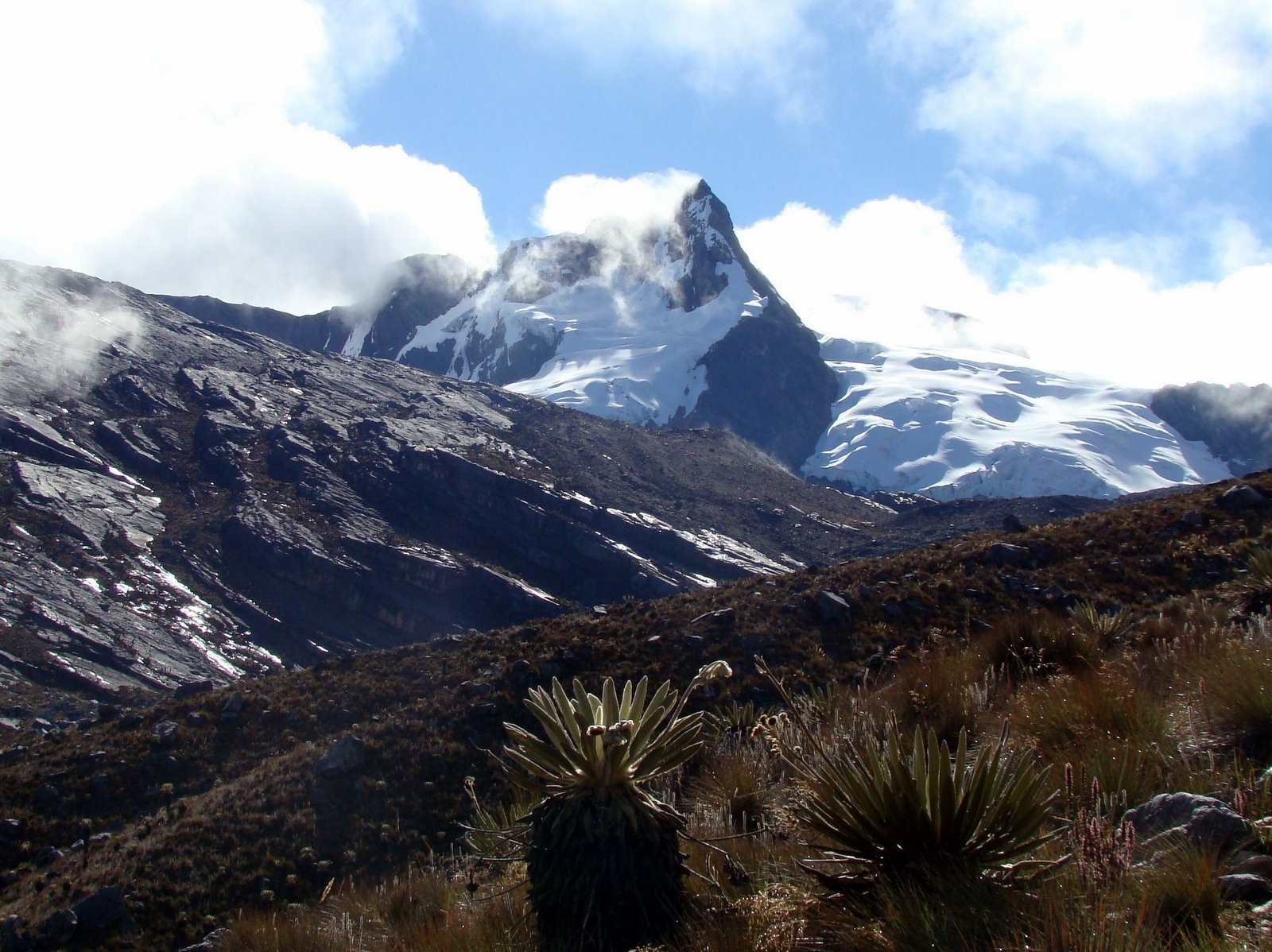
- Pico Aguja (5.040 m), seen from North.

- Location within Colombia
- Location: Andes Mountains, Colombia
- Nearest city: El Cocuy
- Coordinates: 6.501°N 72.12°W
- Area: 3,060 km^{2} (1,180 sq mi)
- Established: 1977
- Website: www.parquesnacionales.gov.co/portal/es/ecoturismo/region-andina/parque-nacional-natural-cocuy/

El Cocuy National Park is a national park located in the Andes Mountains within the nation of Colombia. Its official name is Parque Nacional Natural El Cocuy.

== Geology ==
Because of its high altitude, and although it is located close to the equator, El Cocuy is characterized by post-glacial geological morphology, including steep slopes, cirques, moraines, and glacier-gouged lakes La Pintada and La Cuadrada. The park's topography covers 4,500 meters (15,000 feet) from its lowest point to its highest point. The park is visited by climbers and rockclimbers of all skill levels.

== Geography ==
El Cocuy National Park is located in the Department of Boyacá, near the villages of El Cocuy and Güicán.

== Hydrography ==
El Cocuy National Park plays a key role in regional water regulation, as it is the source of numerous bodies of water that originate in its interior and feed three large hydrographic basins: the Arauca River (with tributaries such as the Cusay and Cabugón rivers), the Casanare River (including the Nevado and Tame rivers) and the Chicamocha River subzone, with tributaries such as the Playitas and Orozco rivers. This water network supplies water to municipalities and villages in the departments of Boyacá, Arauca and Casanare. In addition, the park contributes significantly to climate regulation, acting as a carbon sink thanks to its páramo and Andean forest ecosystems, which helps mitigate the effects of climate change. Its capacity to capture, store and release water, in addition to its influence on regional temperature and humidity, makes the park an essential ecological pillar, for environmental sustainability and the well-being of the community in its area of influence.

== Climate ==
The climate of El Cocuy National Park varies greatly due to its broad altitudinal range, that goes from 600 meters (1968.5 feet) to 5330 meters (17487 feet) over sea level. This variation brings about multiple microclimates, with temperatures that go from -4°C (24.8°F) on the upper parts, up to 24°C (75.2°F) on the lower parts. On the high mountain predominates a cold and dry climate with occasionals snowfalls, strong solar radiation and frequent fog presence. The precipitation is moderate and distributed between dry and humid seasons typical of the Andean region. These weather conditions directly influence in the distribution of the ecosystems, from cold highlands to warmer forests in the foothills of the plains.

== Current events ==
The national park's glacial heritage has made climate change a key element in the park's future. An 1851 watercolor of the "Great Snowfields near Güicán" shows Mount Chita fully capped in snow. As of 2009, the national park's historic icefield has shrunk to scattered snowcaps, and is expected to entirely disappear within a few decades.
