= El Amparo (film) =

- Film poster
- Directed by: Rober Calzadilla
- Written by: Karin Valencillo
- Produced by: Marinella Illas
- Starring: Giovanny García; Vicente Quintero; Samantha Castillo; Vicente Peña; Rossana Hernández
- Release dates: September 15, 2016 (AFI Latin American Film Festival); November 28, 2019
- Running time: 99 minutes
- Countries: Colombia; Venezuela
- Language: Spanish

El Amparo is a 2016 drama film directed by Rober Calzadilla and coproduced between Colombia and Venezuela. The film is set in El Amparo, a Venezuelan location on the shores of Arauca River, in the Colombian border, based in the 1988 Massacre of El Amparo, where the Venezuelan army killed several fishermen, accusing them of being Colombian guerillas.

The film premiered as the opening film of the 2016 AFI Latin American Film Festival. It was screened at Colombian theaters on 28 November 2019.

The film was Venezuela's candidate for the Goya Award for Best Iberoamerican Film in 2018.

== Plot ==
In El Amparo, in the Venezuelan border location with Colombia, two men survive an armed attack perpetrated in the Arauca River, where fourteen of their colleagues were killed. The army accuses them of being Colombian guerrillas, intimidates them and tries to take them away from their cell where they are guarded by a local policeman and the locals, who desperately try to prevent them from being taken away. The men say that they are simple fishermen, but the pressure for them to yield to the official version is overwhelming.

== Cast ==
- Giovanny García
- Vicente Quintero
- Samantha Castillo
- Vicente Peña
- Rossana Hernández
- Patrizia Fusco

== Reception ==
El Amparo was awarded with the Best Film and Best Screenplay São Paulo International Film Festival, the Audience Award in the Bogotá, Milan and Biarritz film festivals and the Best Film Award in the Venezuela and Marseilles festivals.
