= Pico Aguja =

Mountain in Colombia

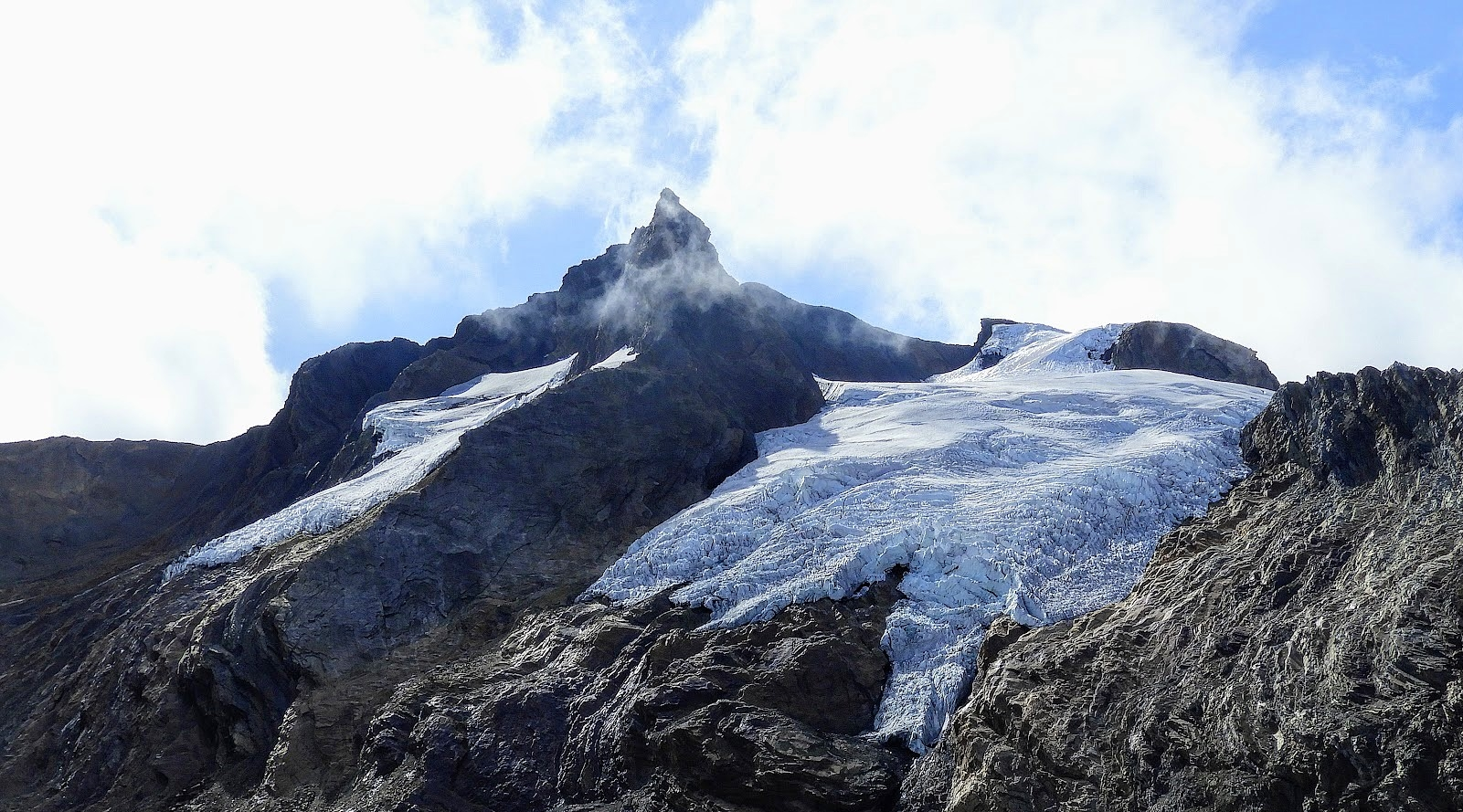
- Northwest aspect

Highest point
- Elevation: 5,040 m (16,535 ft)
- Prominence: 348 m (1,142 ft)
- Parent peak: Ritacuba Blanco
- Isolation: 1.93 km (1.20 mi)
- Coordinates: 6°31′05″N 72°16′51″W

Geography
- Location within Colombia
- Country: Colombia
- Department: Boyacá
- Protected area: El Cocuy National Park
- Parent range: Andes; Cordillera Oriental
- Topo map: CIGM Sheet 137 El Cocuy

Pico Aguja is a mountain in Boyacá, Colombia.

== Description ==
Pico Aguja is a 5,040-meter-elevation (16,535-foot) summit in the Cordillera Oriental which is a subrange of the Andes. The peak is within El Cocuy National Park. It ranks as the 17th-highest peak in the park and Boyacá Department, as well as the 40th-highest in the country. Precipitation runoff from the mountain's slopes drains into tributaries of the Arauca River which is part of the Orinoco watershed. Topographic relief is significant as the summit rises 500 meters (1,640 feet) in one kilometer (0.6 mile) along the east and west slopes. The nearest higher peak is Ritacuba Norte, 1.93 kilometers (1.2 miles) to the west-southwest. The mountain's Spanish toponym translates as "Needle Peak."

== Climate ==
Based on the Köppen climate classification, Pico Aguja is located in a tundra climate zone. Here in the tierra fría, air is forced upward by the mountains (orographic lift), causing moisture to drop in the form of rain and snow. This climate supports three small glaciers on the slopes of the peak. The months of September, December, and January offer the most favorable weather for visiting this area.

== Gallery ==
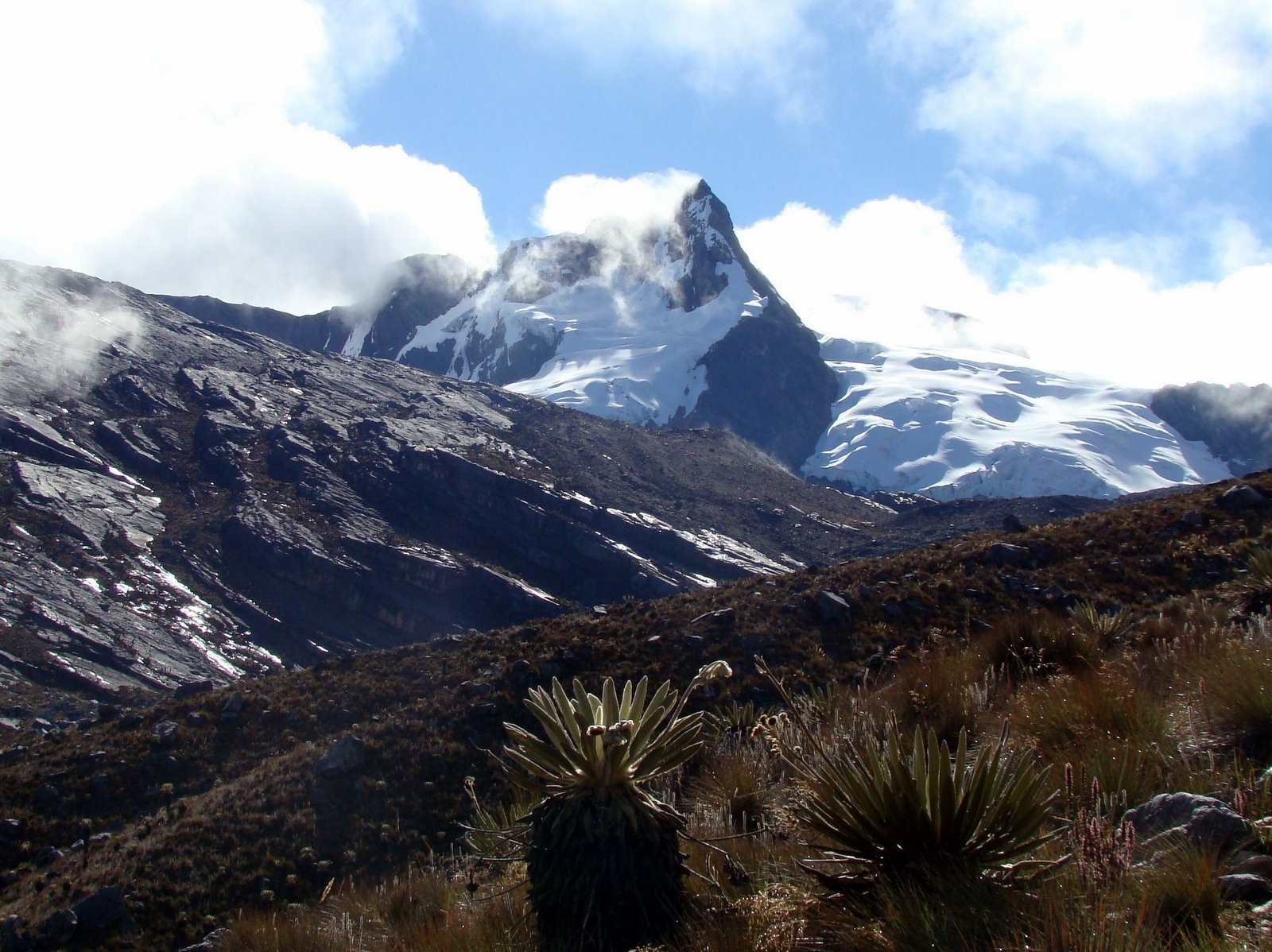
North aspect

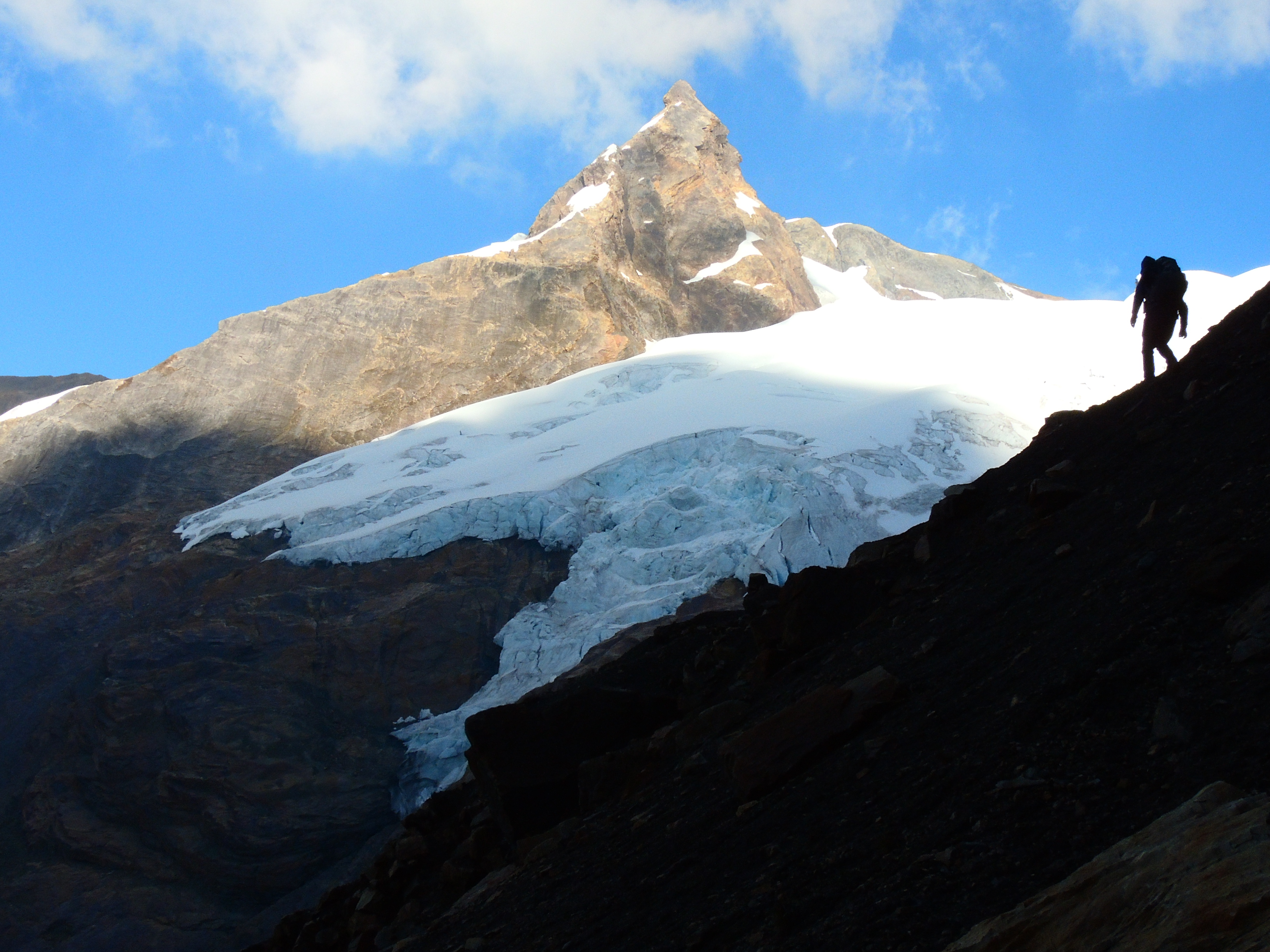
WSW aspect

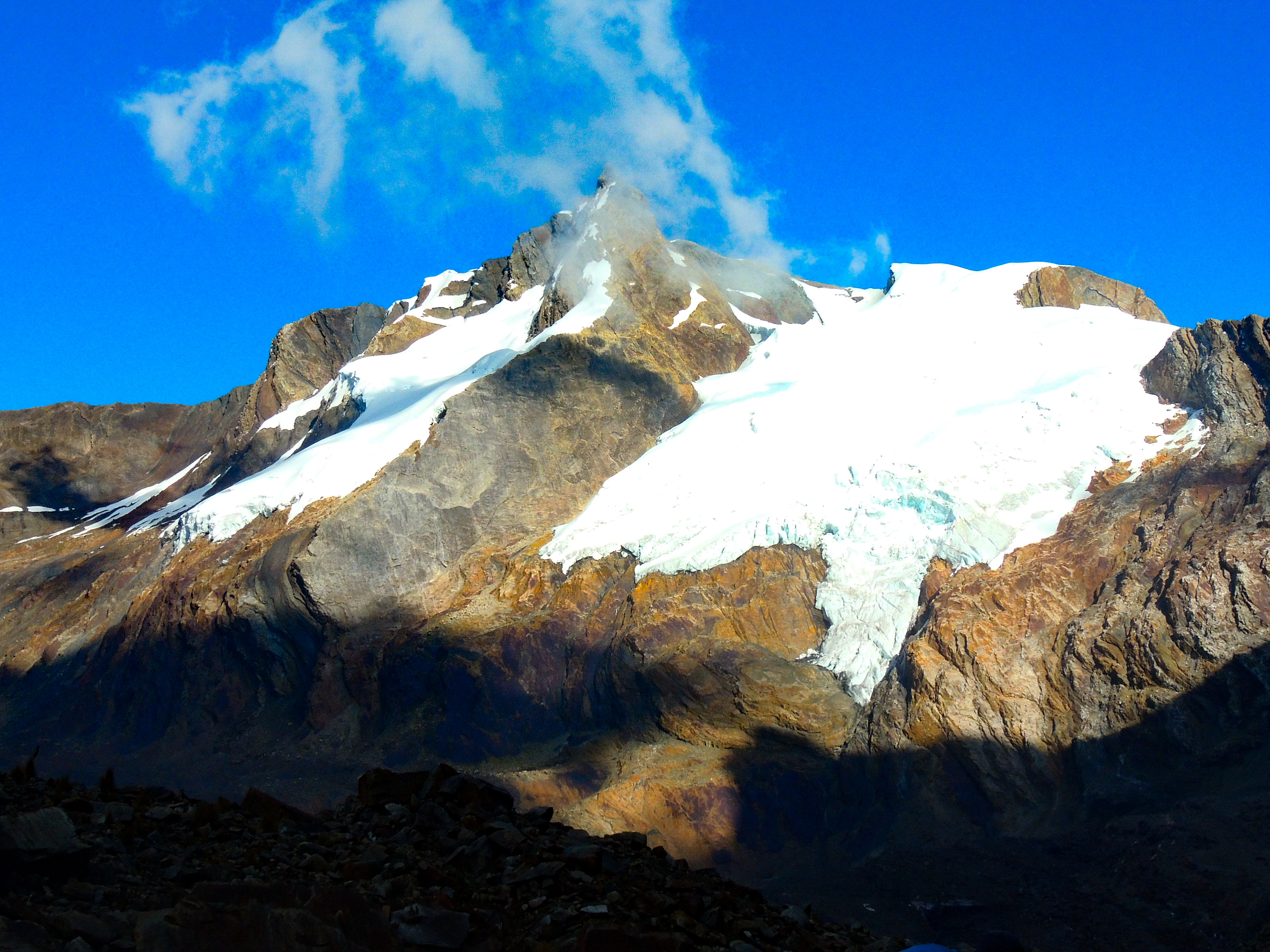
West aspect

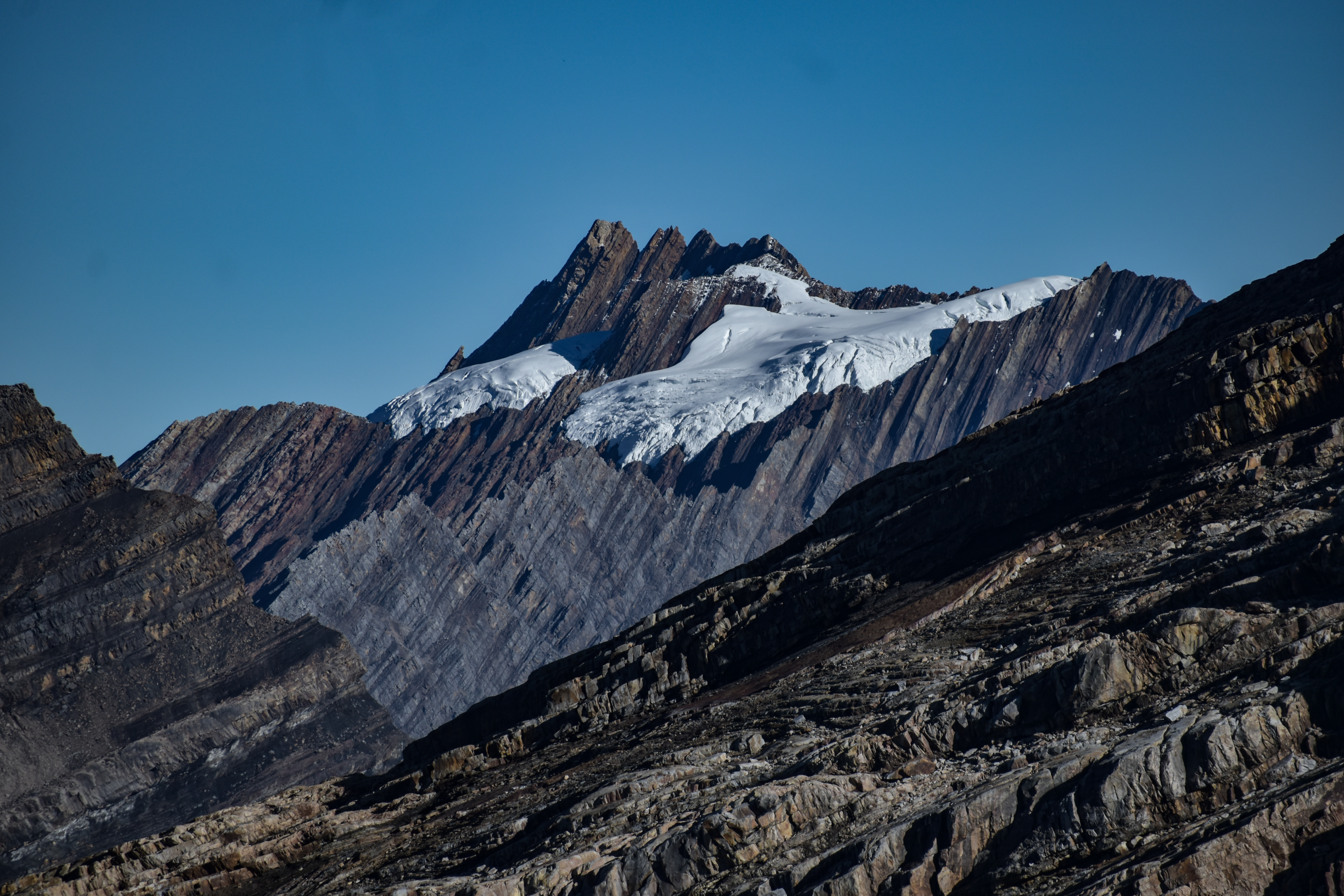
South aspect, with Glaciar Picos Sin Nombre

== See also ==
- Sierra Nevada del Cocuy
- List of mountains in Colombia
