= Santa Elena de Uairén =

- City
- The City of Santa Elena de Uairén
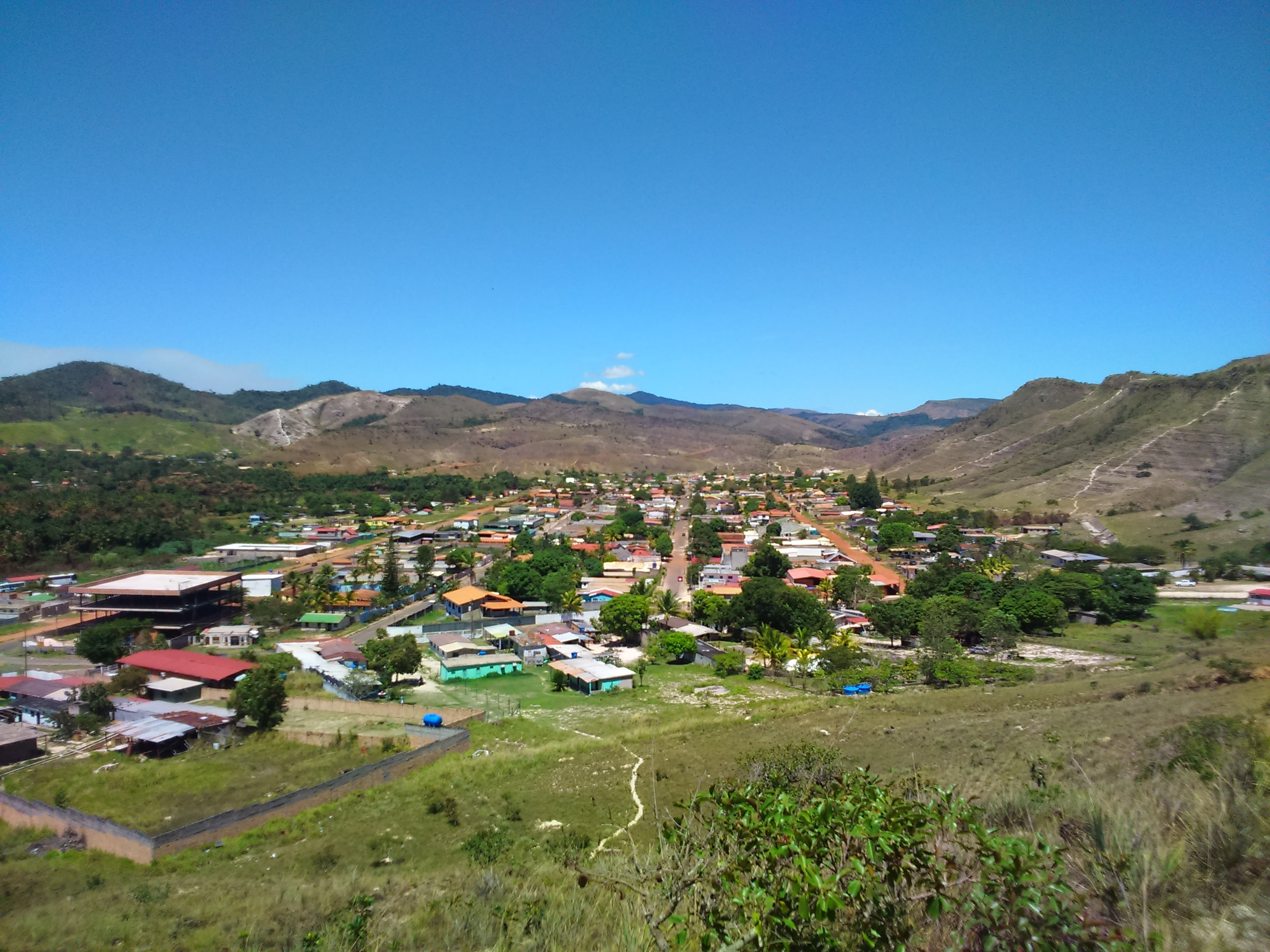
- Nickname: Santa Elena
- Location within Venezuela
- Coordinates: 4°36′7.63″N 61°6′40.3″W
- Country: Venezuela
- Region: Guayana
- State: Bolívar
- Municipality: Gran Sabana
- Founded: November 13, 1923
- Elevation: 900 m (3,000 ft)

Population (2006)
  - Total: 29,795
- Time zone: UTC−4 (VET)
- Postal Code: 8052
- Area code: +58 288
- Climate: Am

Santa Elena de Uairén (Spanish pronunciation: [ˈsanta eˈlena ðe wajˈɾen]) is a city in Bolívar State, Venezuela located near the border with Brazil and Guyana. It was founded by Lucas Fernández Peña in 1923. The city's name originates from his first daughter, Elena, and Uairén, the river that crosses the city.

Located in the middle of La Gran Sabana, Santa Elena is home to many travel agencies offering tours in Canaima National Park, flights over Angel Falls, and hiking tours to the famous Monte Roraima.

The town is notable for its influential presence of indigenous peoples; there is even a community called Manakrü (pronounced mah-nah-CREE) populated entirely by indigenous people. The schools in this neighborhood use both Spanish and Pemon, an indigenous language.

Due to its proximity to the Brazilian state of Roraima, Santa Elena sees a busy exchange between the two countries of Brazilian consumer products from Brazil and Venezuelan oil and petrol. Other Brazilian cities that trade with Santa Elena de Uairen are Manaus, Santarém, Macapá, and Belém.

Santa Elena is relatively safe compared to other Venezuelan cities.

== Languages ==
- Spanish
- Pemon - the language of almost all the indigenous people in the area is Pemón, a language of the Caribbean family related to the extinct Tamanaco and Chaimas.
- Portuguese - in Santa Elena de Uairén, it is also common to find that a percentage of the residents speak Portuguese, due to its proximity to Brazil. In 1999, a free zone was declared in the city and it is crowded with Brazilians during the weekends seeking low(er)-priced food, electronics, and hygiene products.

== 2019 massacre ==
In 2019, the Venezuelan National Guard shot several Pemon civilians in the city, shortly after they had killed a large number of protesters in San Francisco de Yuruaní. The massacre began at 7:00 AM and resulted in 11 deaths as well as 31-57 injuries. Widespread criticism erupted in response to the attack.

== Climate ==
Climate data for Santa Elena De Uairen (1971–2000)
Month	Jan	Feb	Mar	Apr	May	Jun	Jul	Aug	Sep	Oct	Nov	Dec	Year
Mean daily maximum °C (°F)	27.5 (81.5)	28.1 (82.6)	28.4 (83.1)	27.7 (81.9)	26.9 (80.4)	26.1 (79.0)	26.0 (78.8)	26.6 (79.9)	27.5 (81.5)	28.2 (82.8)	27.8 (82.0)	27.4 (81.3)	27.4 (81.2)
Mean daily minimum °C (°F)	16.6 (61.9)	17.0 (62.6)	17.4 (63.3)	17.6 (63.7)	17.8 (64.0)	17.5 (63.5)	16.8 (62.2)	16.9 (62.4)	16.7 (62.1)	16.7 (62.1)	16.8 (62.2)	16.7 (62.1)	17.0 (62.7)
Average precipitation mm (inches)	76.3 (3.00)	61.9 (2.44)	94.7 (3.73)	155.8 (6.13)	237.3 (9.34)	273.0 (10.75)	250.8 (9.87)	203.3 (8.00)	130.9 (5.15)	139.6 (5.50)	111.8 (4.40)	91.0 (3.58)	1,826.4 (71.89)
Average precipitation days (≥ 0.1 mm)	11.4	9.4	11.9	14.8	22.8	26.0	25.9	23.1	15.2	13.9	12.9	12.4	199.7
Source: World Meteorological Organization

== Consular representation ==
Brazil has a Vice-consulate in Santa Elena de Uairén.

== Sister Cities ==
- BRA Pacaraima, Roraima
- VEN Ciudad Bolívar, Bolívar State
- VEN Upata, Bolivar State
- BRA Boa Vista, Roraima

== See also ==
- List of cities and towns in Venezuela
