= Massacre of El Amparo =

Mass murder of fishermen in Venezuela

The Massacre of El Amparo was a massacre of 14 fishermen which took place near the village of El Amparo, in Venezuela's western state of Apure, on 29 October 1988.

== Investigation ==
A joint military-police unit claimed the fishermen (who had no police records and were not known to either Venezuelan or Colombian military intelligence) were a group of guerillas who attacked them with guns and grenades, with an alleged 15–20 minute exchange of gunfire occurring at a range of 20–30m. No injuries were sustained by the unit, and an informant from the unit told investigators that the arms that were found amongst the bodies of the fishermen had been planted. An autopsy performed by Colombian officials on a Venezuelan victim found that he had been shot in the back, his skull crushed by heavy blows, and his face disfigured by acid. A month later further autopsies were performed by Venezuelan officials, with similar findings; the report was suppressed, but witnesses reported the results.

A case taken to the Inter-American Court of Human Rights (IACHR) concluded in 1996, with the IACHR ordering Venezuela to pay over $700,000 in reparations to next of kin and surviving victims.

== Popular culture ==
The 2016 film El Amparo portrays two survivors of the massacre, who have to face the pressure of being accused of being guerrillas and retaliation.

== See also ==
- List of massacres in Venezuela
- Yumare massacre
- 2021 Apure clashes
