= Altagracia massacre =

2014 massacre in Altagracia de Orituco, Guárico, Venezuela

Altagracia Massacre
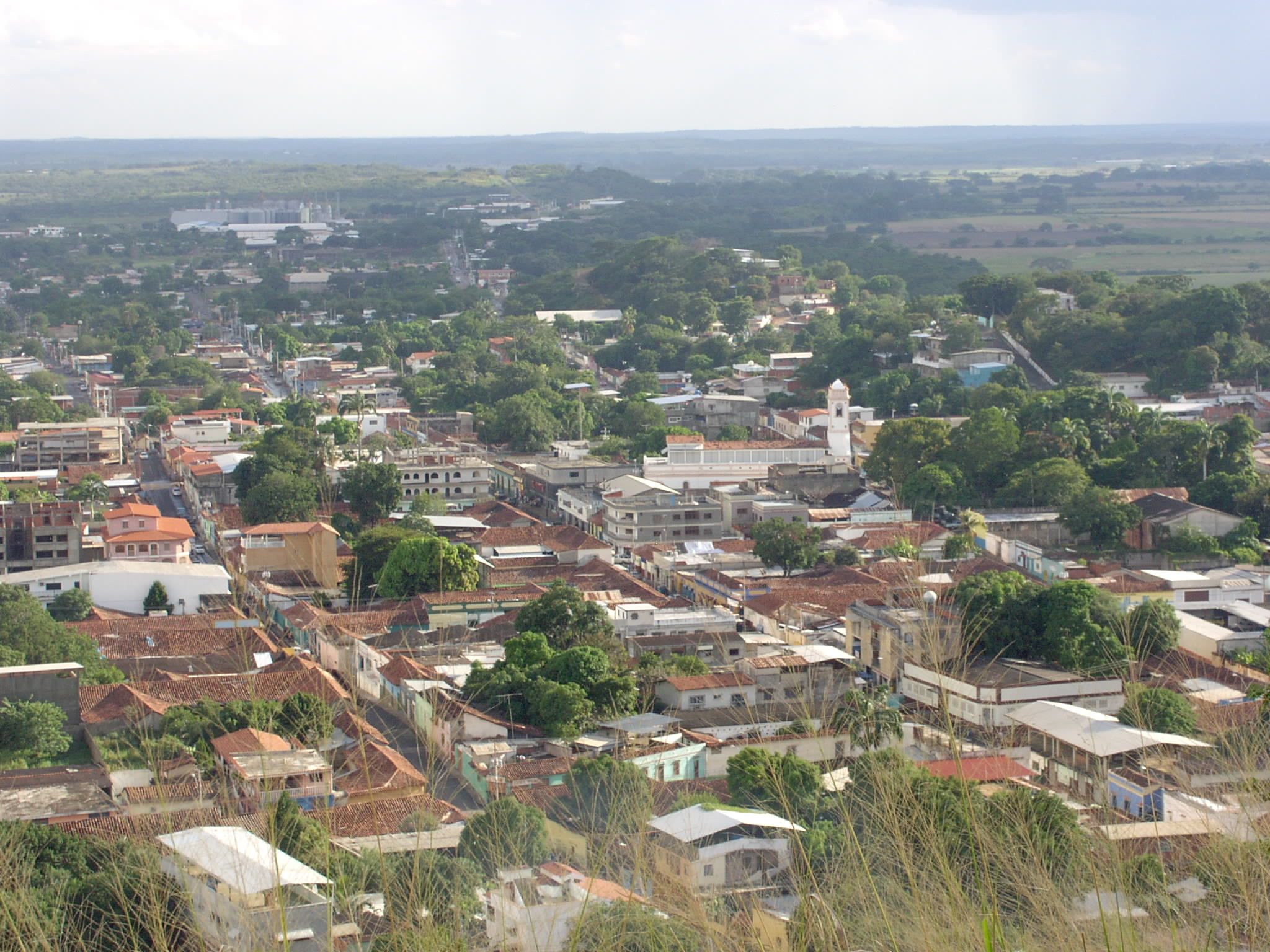
- Location: Altagracia de Orituco, Guárico, Venezuela
- Date: November 10, 2014
- Attack type: shooting
- Weapons: AK-47, AR-15, FN FAL, shotgun, pistols Glock, etc.
- Deaths: 11
- Perpetrator: Tren del Llano
- Motive: Conflict between gangs

The Altagracia massacre was an event that occurred on November 10, 2014, in the Altagracia de Orituco sector, in Guárico state on the border with Aragua state in Venezuela, where 11 people died when they were ambushed by a rival gang while they were extorting in an estate called San Juan de Dios.

== Background ==
Starting in 2014, in Venezuela the social crisis intensified, the gangs started to stock up in weapons and to recruit more men to their ranks. In this case, the gang "El Picure" was composed of more than 40 men who carried rifles, pistols, grenades, etc. This gang had killed more than 40 people in a little more than a year including: police, national guardsmen, CICPC officials, farmers, other criminals, as well as civilians who were caught in the line of fire.

== Events ==
On November 10, in the finca San Juan de Dios, its owner and employees were ambushed by an armed group of 11 men, members of the gang "El Juvenal", which operated in Aragua, who arrived in cars and motorcycles with weapons, intimidating those they encountered in the finca, making them pay a tribute to the gang and to make them meals at the same time that these drank liquor, played billiards, etc. The owner was familiar with El Picure, known crime boss in the country, and taking advantage of an oversight on the part of the armed subjects, he contacted his nephew by telephone to inform him of the situation. Then, an armed commando of more than 40 men aboard 8 trucks arrived at the farm and got out of them with long and short weapons, proceeding to subdue the subjects and shoot them down.

Officials from the CICPC, the National Guard, and other police forces went to the site to collect evidence and were met with gunfire, managing to confront the perpetrators of the incident who managed to flee the scene.

== Political reaction ==
R. Rodriguez Chacin
(@rerchacin)
tweeted:

Spanish:

Asumo el mando de las investigaciones del enfrentamiento entre bandas en el sur de Aragua. Pronto habra resultados y acciones contundentes.

Translation:

I assume command of the investigations of the confrontation between gangs in the south of Aragua. Soon there will be results and strong actions.

11 November 2014

After arriving at the crime scene, more than 100 officials from various security forces carried out several raids in the community of El Sombrero, without finding the whereabouts of the suspects. The Public Ministry commissioned the 8th prosecutor of Guárico, Yomar Mota, to investigate the incident where 11 people died. The governor of Guárico, Ramón Rodríguez Chacín, announced via Twitter that he would take responsibility for investigations into the incident.

== Victims ==
The victims were identified as the following:

- Alfredo José Herrera Paraco (43)
- Argenis Sánchez (29)
- Plácido Jacinto Carrillo Sánchez (21)
- Francisco Hurtado (18)
- Carlos Alberto Gómez (19)
- Darbin Neomar Sánchez (22)
- José Gregorio Cárdenas (20)
- Wilsen Alexánder Figueredo Cepeda (22)
- Jordys Miguel Matute (20)
- Dixon Rafael Meza (25)

and a last unidentified victim.

== See also ==
- Los Maniceros massacre
