= Retén de Catia massacre =

1992 Venezuelan massacre

- Location: Catia Prison, Caracas, Venezuela
- Date: 27 November 1992
- Deaths: 63; 100-200 (extraofficially)
- Injuries: 52
- Perpetrators: National Guard of Venezuela; Caracas Metropolitan Police

The Retén de Catia massacre occurred during the failed 27 November 1992 Venezuelan coup d'état attempt. In the early morning of 27 November 1992, agents of the National Guard and the Caracas Metropolitan Police intervened the penitentiary center of the Retén de Catia, killing at least 53 inmates.

== Massacre ==
In the early morning hours of 27 November 1992, agents of the National Guard and the Caracas Metropolitan Police intervened the penitentiary center of Retén de Catia. The events resulted in the death of approximately 53 people and dozens of wounded and missing. In the course of the 48 hours in which the events took place inside the Catia Prison, approximately 63 inmates died, including 37 victims of the Montero Aranguren and others (Catia Prison) v. Venezuela case before the Inter-American Court of Human Rights, 52 were wounded and 28 disappeared.

== Aftermath ==
Despite a series of appeals, no further investigation was carried out and no sanctions were imposed on those responsible. At the time, official sources indicated that the number of dead was 63, the governor of Caracas for that year, Antonio Ledezma, indicated more than 100, and the newspaper El Nacional reported a figure of over than 200.

== See also ==
- November 1992 Venezuelan coup attempt
- List of massacres in Venezuela
