= San Francisco de Yuruaní =

Kumarakapay
- San Francisco de Yuruaní
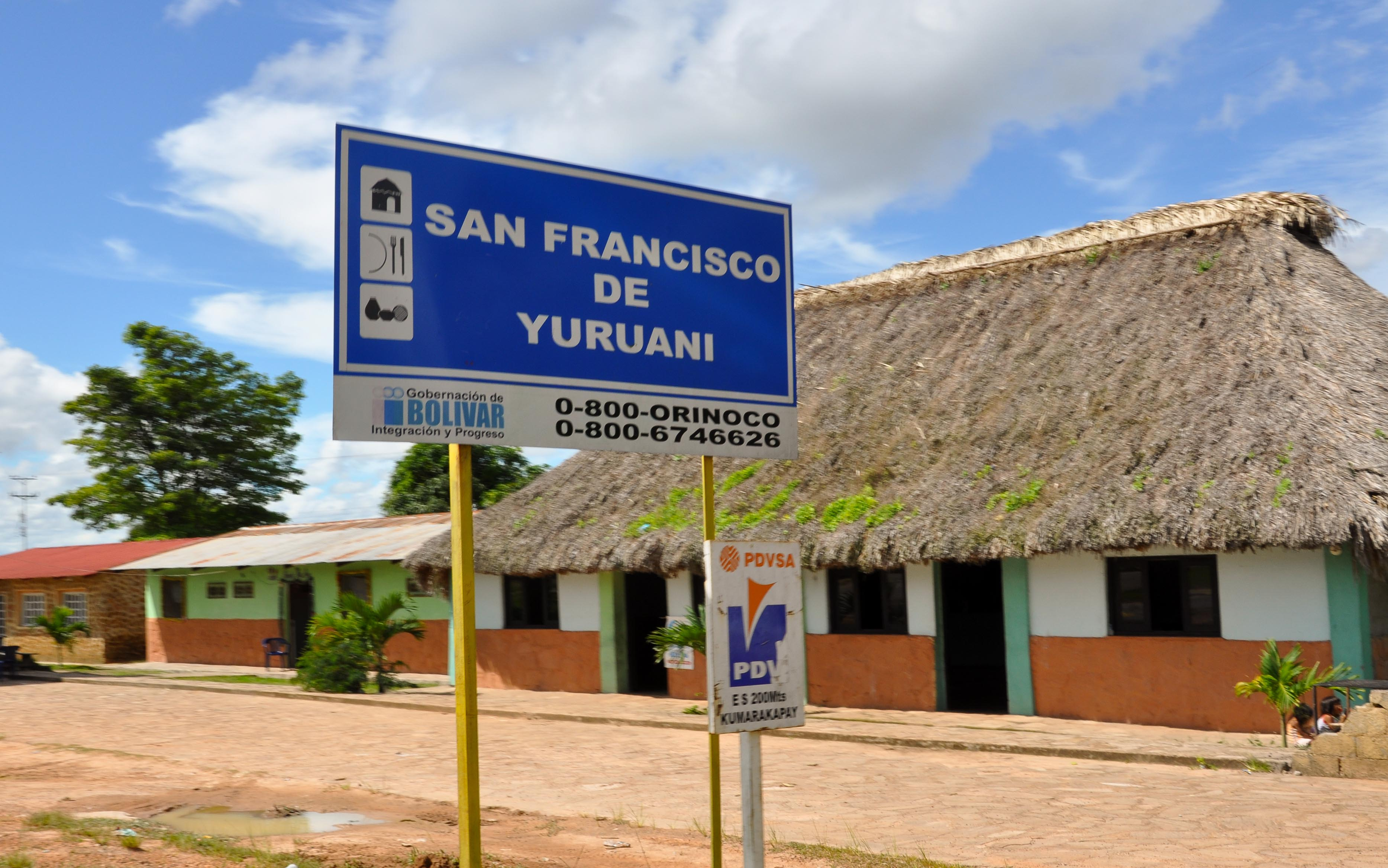

- Location within Venezuela
- Coordinates: 5°03′30″N 61°05′50″W
- Country: Venezuela
- State: Bolívar (state)
- Municipality: Gran Sabana

Ethnicities
  - Majority: Pemon

San Francisco de Yuruaní, also known as Kumarakapay, is a town in Venezuela. The majority of people there are members of the indigenous Pemon people.

== Economy ==
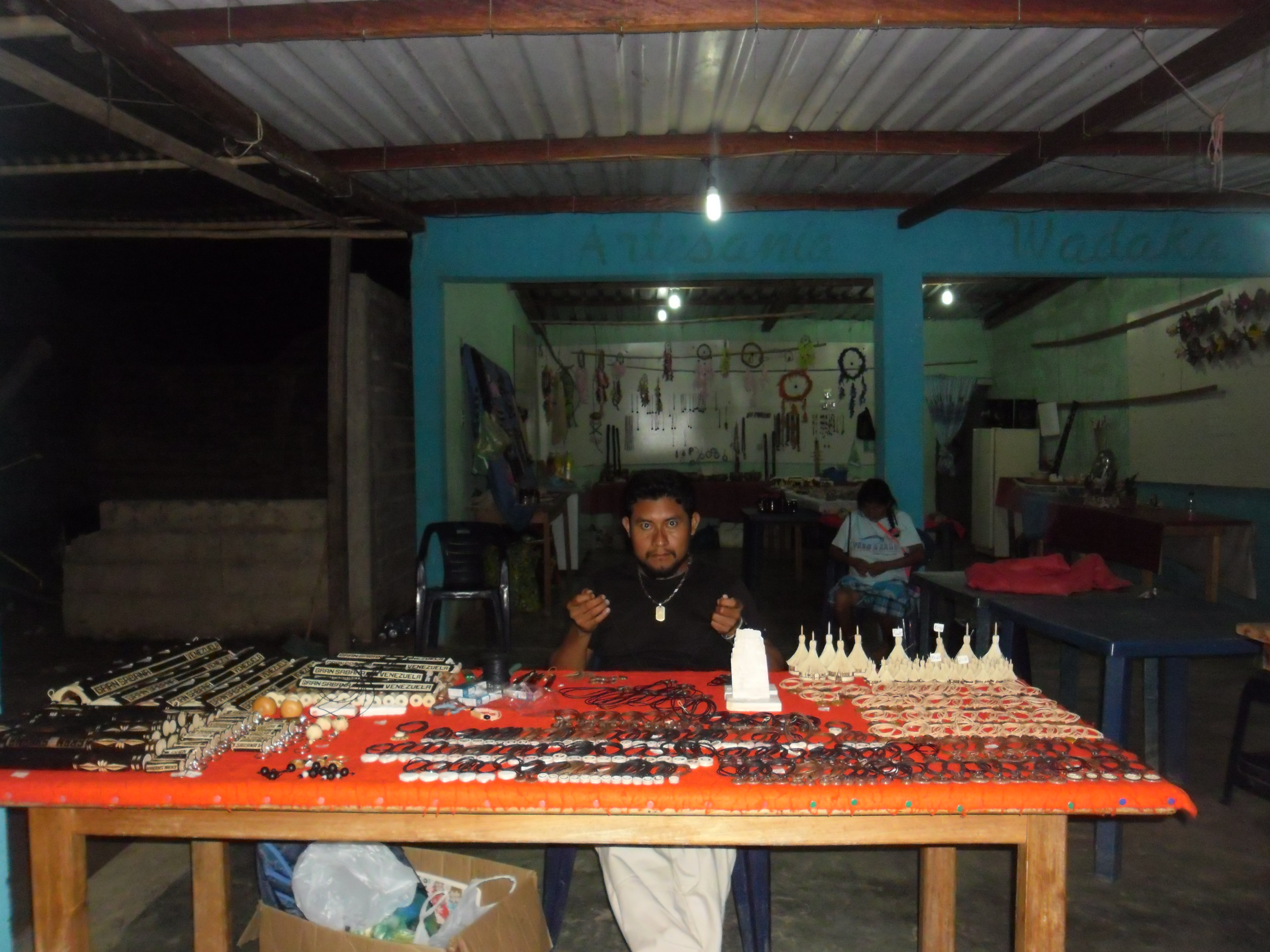
Shop in San Francisco de Yuruaní

The town's economy relies almost entirely on tourism, mainly coming from Brazil.

== Kumarakapay massacre ==
In 2019, Western countries announced international aid to Venezuela. Venezuelan president Nicolas Maduro, who portrayed the efforts as an international effort aiming for his overthrow, enforced a program to obstruct the aid program. Numerous clashes occurred between Government forces and Pemon protesters.

On Friday 22 February 2019 the Venezuelan Army sent troops to the Brazilian border, driving through Kumarakapay, despite the fact the tribe held autonomy over the town. Local Indigenous Protesters and leaders in Kumarakapay attempted to halt advancing personnel carriers by building a road blockade, managing to detain several soldiers.

The other Venezuelan soldiers fired back at them, killing five Pemon and injuring around 12 more. The army is reported to have pursued protestors and dissidents into their homes where they were shot. Hundreds of Pemon fled into the local woods and surrounding communities to escape. 23 people were arrested and tortured by the army shortly afterwards. Among those killed was a local tour guide, Rolando Garcia, and his wife, Zoraida Rodríguez, who was killed on the doorsteps outside her own home.

Justo Noguera, the governor of Bolivar, responded that the Pemons' attempt to stop the military vehicles was a terrorist attack; also denying that the people killed were civilians.

=== Aftermath ===
The next day, residents of San Francisco de Yuruaní attempted to stop another group of soldiers on their way to the border. Jose Montoya, a Venezuelan General serving as the Army's commander for the region, attempted to intervene on behalf of the Pemon.

The military responded faster than the previous time, arresting Montayo and four Pemons almost immediately. One local overheard an officer yell, "So you Pemon tribesmen think you're tough? You're going to die here." Montayo and his companions have not been seen since.

Over 966–1,500 tribesmen from the region, many from Kumarakapay, fled to Brazil shortly after the attacks, fearful of further reprisals and human rights violations, forming one of the largest exoduses in South American history. The town's mayor also fled the country to Brazil.

The army later killed 11 people in Santa Elena de Uairén.

Former governor Andrés Velásquez declared that fourteen people were killed and that many of them had gunshots wounds in their heads, indicating involvement of snipers. He further explained that "many have died due to lack of attention because the Santa Elena hospital did not have blood, saline solution, reactives nor oxygen, or operating rooms to intervene the patients", that the people died bleeding and the hospital personnel could not do anything to help them. By the end of the conflict, National Assemblyman Romel Guzamana, a chieftain of the Pemon community in Gran Sabana, stated that at least 25 Pemon were killed in what has been described as a "massacre" by Venezuelan troops. The National Assembly added that 80 Pemons had disappeared since the massacre, in addition to the death toll claimed by Guzamana.

=== Reactions ===
The Venezuelan authorities later accused the Pemon locals of being backed by foreign governments; Jorge Arreaza, tweeting," From Peru they enter through Colombia and receive support also in Brazil. It is a coup strategy of triangulation of Lima Cartel governments to produce violence, death and political destabilization in Venezuela." Jorge Rodriguez voiced similar beliefs.

The principal leader of the Venezuelan opposition, Juan Guaidó, tweeted later that the incident in Kumarakapay, as well as Maduro's treatment of Indigenous communities in general, was "murder" that would "not go unpunished."
