= Los Maniceros massacre =

2009 abduction and massacre in Colombia

- The men's corpses were found scattered across Táchira in Venezuela.
- Location: Táchira, Venezuela
- Attack type: Kidnapping and murder
- Deaths: 11
- Injuries: 1

The Los Maniceros massacre was the 2009 kidnapping in Colombia of twelve members of a Colombian amateur association football team Los Maniceros (The Peanut Men), eleven of whom were later murdered. The dead were aged between 17 and 38.

A single survivor, 19-year-old Manuel Cortez, sustained a bullet wound through his neck. The eleven bodies were discovered in several locations across the state of Táchira in Venezuela, according to Venezuela's Vice President Ramón Carrizales. The kidnapped men were mostly Colombian; one was Peruvian and one Venezuelan.

Venezuela was on high alert following the incident, with troops in the area ordered to "act forcefully" against any armed Colombian group.

== Kidnapping ==
The men, nutsellers by trade, were kidnapped and thrown into vans on 11 October 2009 in La Tala, Táchira, where they had come for a football match. The kidnappers were disguised in black clothing and called the men's names before seizing them from a field on which they had been playing football. Their bodies were discovered on 24 October 2009 with several bullet wounds.

=== Survivor ===
Manuel Cortez is the only survivor. Security was increased in fear for the safety of Cortez. A man was arrested after requesting to see him in the hospital and Cortez was quickly placed under guard at a separate military hospital. He said they were all chained by their necks to trees and had spent two weeks in this condition outdoors in the sun.

== Suspects ==
The main suspect is the left-wing National Liberation Army (ELN), with Cortez blaming the group for the massacre. He said they had been lured into the group's territory by its leader. A motive has not been uncovered.

== Reaction ==
- Colombia: President Álvaro Uribe called it a "deplorable act". He said the massacre was an example that showed "terrorism is international, that it has no borders". He expressed his hope that authorities would "take those terrorists to jail".
- Venezuela: Vice President Ramón Carrizales linked the attack to Colombia's domestic troubles.

== In popular culture ==
This murder is referenced in Red Dead Redemption 2.

== See also ==
- List of kidnappings
- List of massacres in Venezuela
