= Pedro María Freites Municipality =

Pedro María Freites Municipality Municipio Pedro María Freites
- Municipality
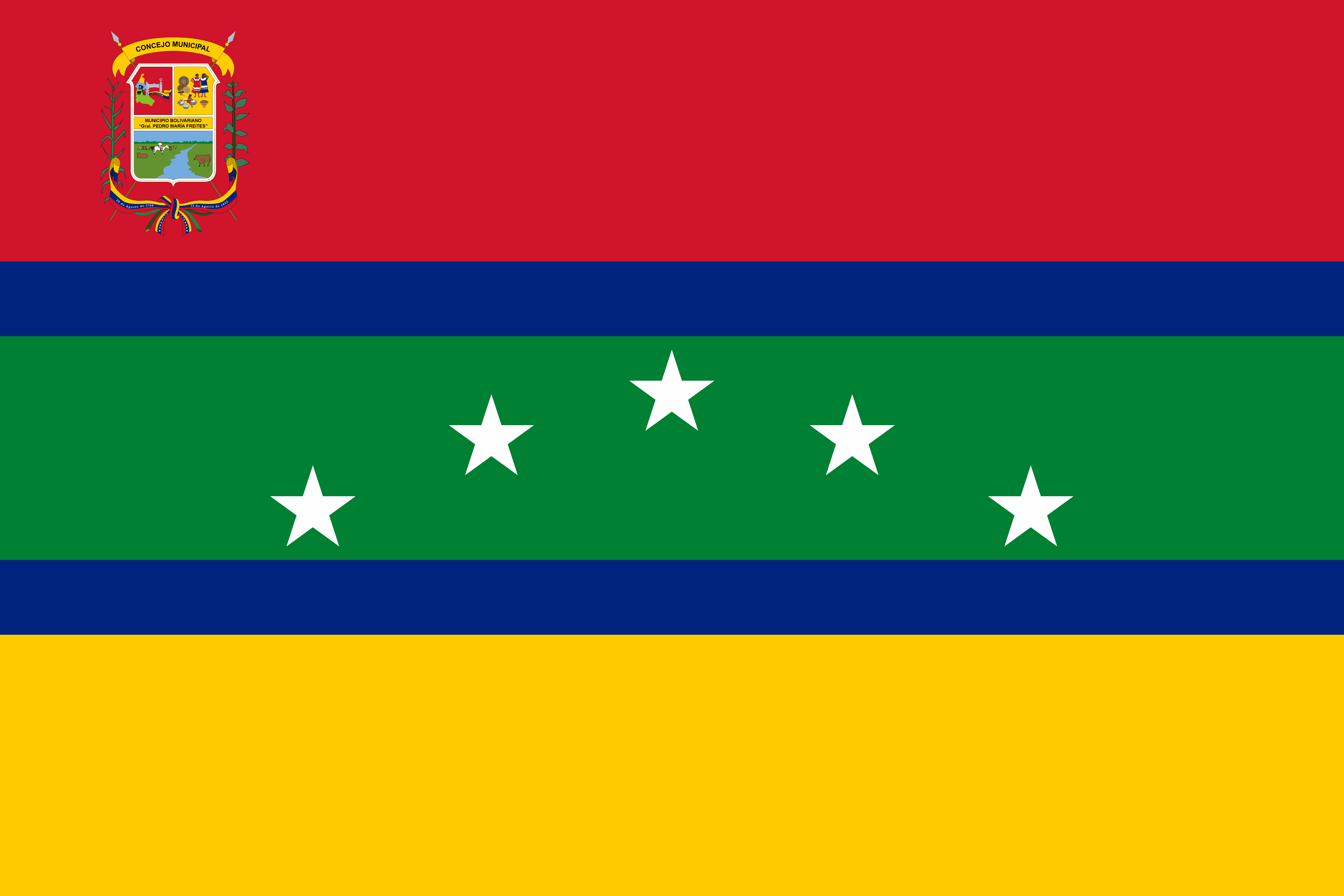
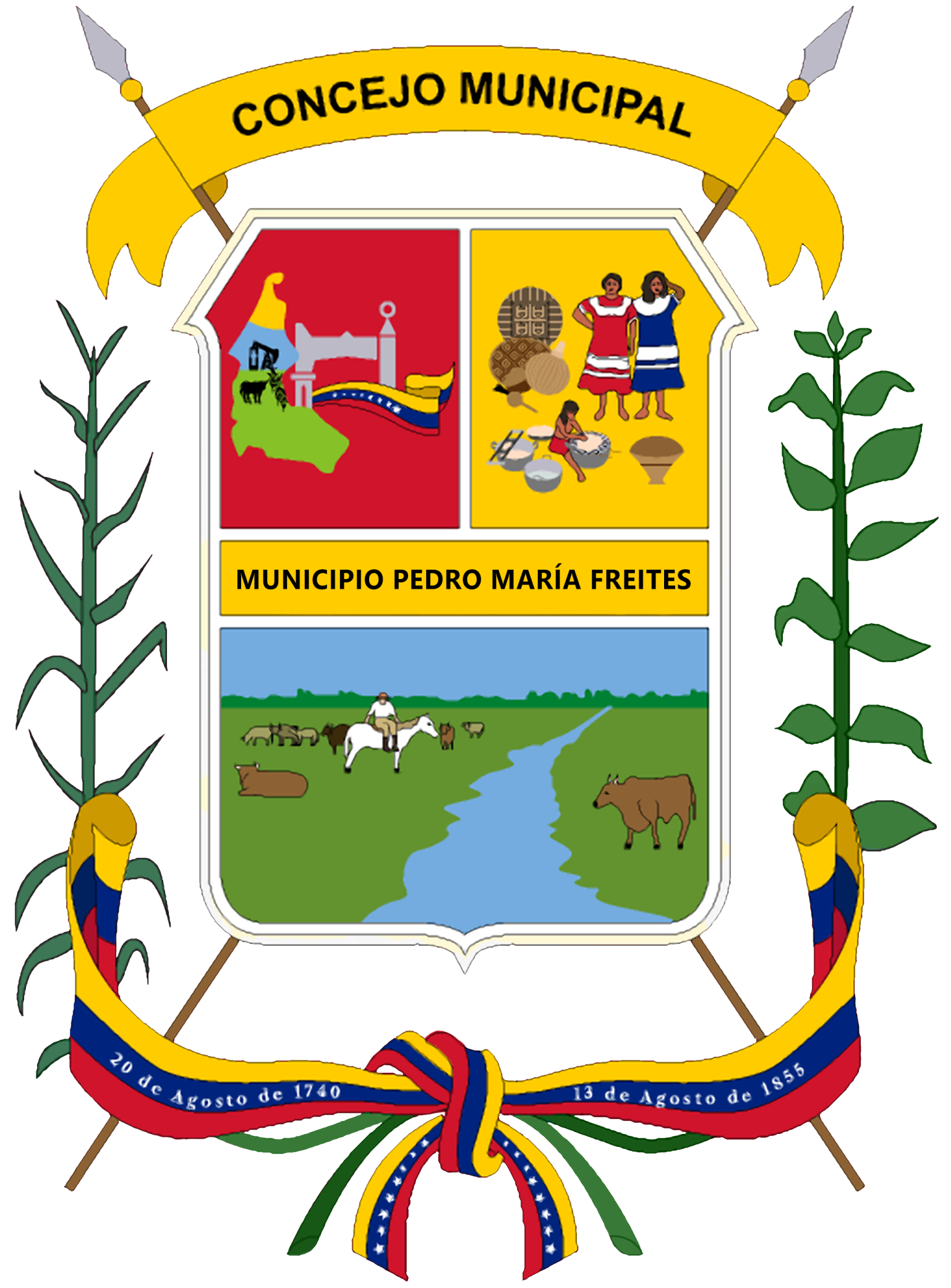
- Flag Coat of arms

- Location in Anzoátegui

- Location in Venezuela
- Coordinates: 9°23′51″N 64°10′56″W
- Country: Venezuela
- State: Anzoátegui
- Municipal seat: Cantaura

Government
  - Mayor: Gabriel Hernández Trillo (PSUV)

Area
  - Total: 7,689.4 km^{2} (2,968.9 sq mi)

Population (2011)
  - Total: 73,121
  - Density: 9.5093/km^{2} (24.629/sq mi)
- Time zone: UTC−4 (VET)
- Area code(s): 0282
- Website: Official website

The Pedro María Freites Municipality is one of the 21 municipalities (municipios) that makes up the eastern Venezuelan state of Anzoátegui and, according to the 2011 census by the National Institute of Statistics of Venezuela, the municipality has a population of 73,121. The town of Cantaura is the shire town of the Pedro María Freites Municipality. The municipality is named for Pedro María Freites.

== Climate ==
Minimum monthly temperature varies with elevation between 19.8 and 22.8 °C while maximum temperatures are between 30.5 and 33.6 °C. Annual precipitation is between 968 and 1109 mm, with most rainfall between June and August, and the driest quarter between January and March.

== Demographics ==
The Pedro María Freites Municipality, according to a 2007 population estimate by the National Institute of Statistics of Venezuela, has a population of 76,892 (up from 68,146 in 2000). This amounts to 5.2% of the state's population. The municipality's population density is 10.75 inhabitants per square kilometre (27.8/sq mi).

== Government ==
The mayor of the Pedro María Freites Municipality is Evelín Urdaneta, re-elected November 23, 2008 with 52% of the vote. The municipality is divided into four parishes; Capital Pedro María Freites, Libertador, Santa Rosa, and Urica.
