= Yumare massacre =

Venezuelan massacre

The Yumare massacre was an incident in which agents of DISIP, the counter-intelligence agency of Venezuela, killed nine social activists, who were mistaken for members of a guerrilla group. It took place on 8 May 1986, in Yaracuy State, Venezuela. At the time, officials falsely claimed that the activists had ambushed the DISIP agents and were killed during an armed confrontation. The actual circumstances of the incident were revealed in 2011 by retired Army General Alexis Ramón Sanchéz, who admitted his role in the killings.

== Investigation ==
An investigation was re-opened in 2006, which led to 29 individuals being charged in connection with the massacre, including Jaime Lusinchi, then President of Venezuela, and Henry López Sisco, then head of DISIP. López Sisco evaded arrest and fled the country.

In May 2011, retired Army General Alexis Ramón Sanchéz, having confessed his role in the massacre and identified others responsible, was sentenced to 13 years in prison. His sentence length was reduced due to his cooperation, and he was allowed to serve it at home due to his age and ill health.

== See also ==
- List of massacres in Venezuela
