= Municipio Gran Sabana =

Gran Sabana Municipality Municipio Gran Sabana
- Municipality
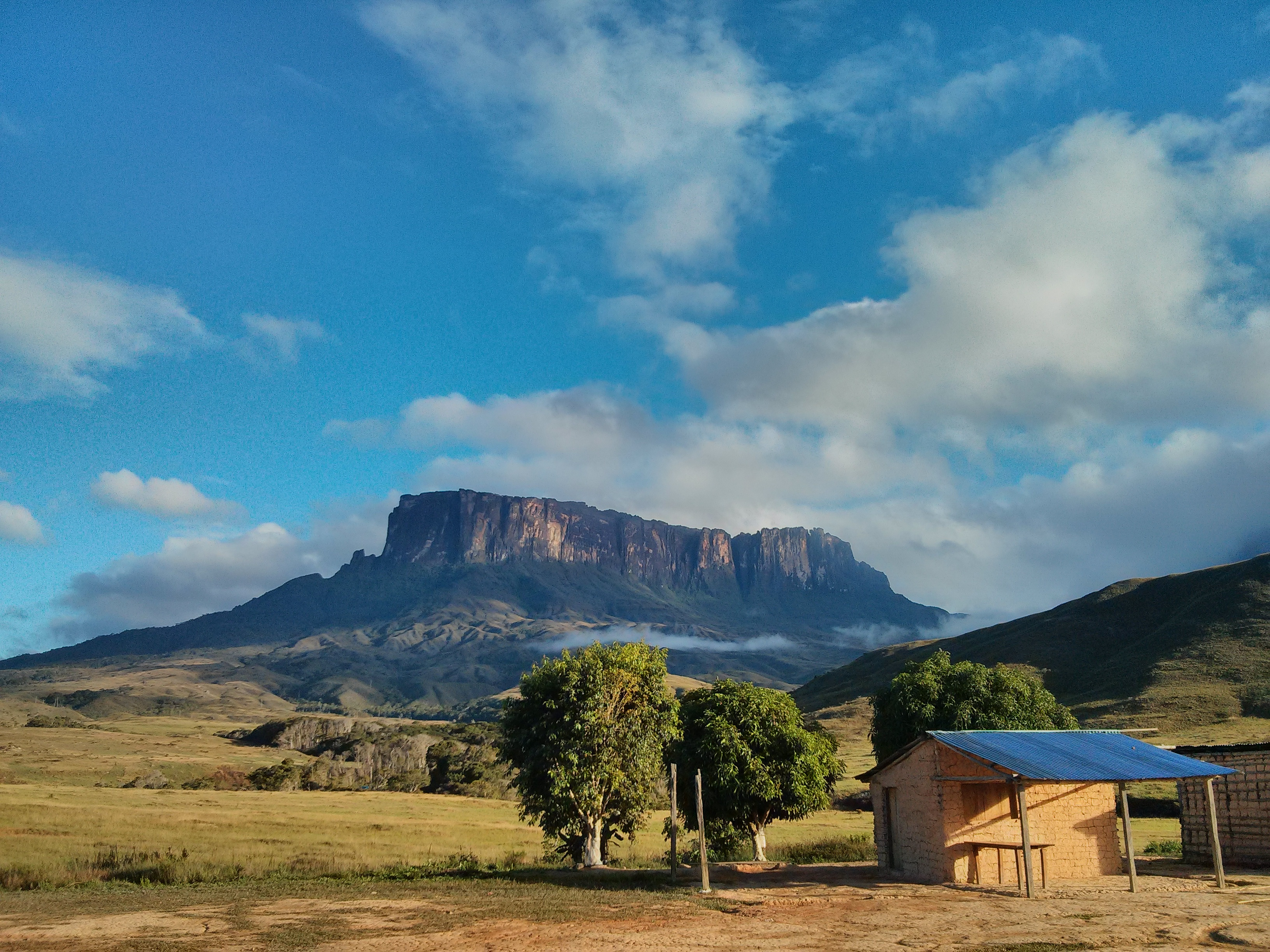

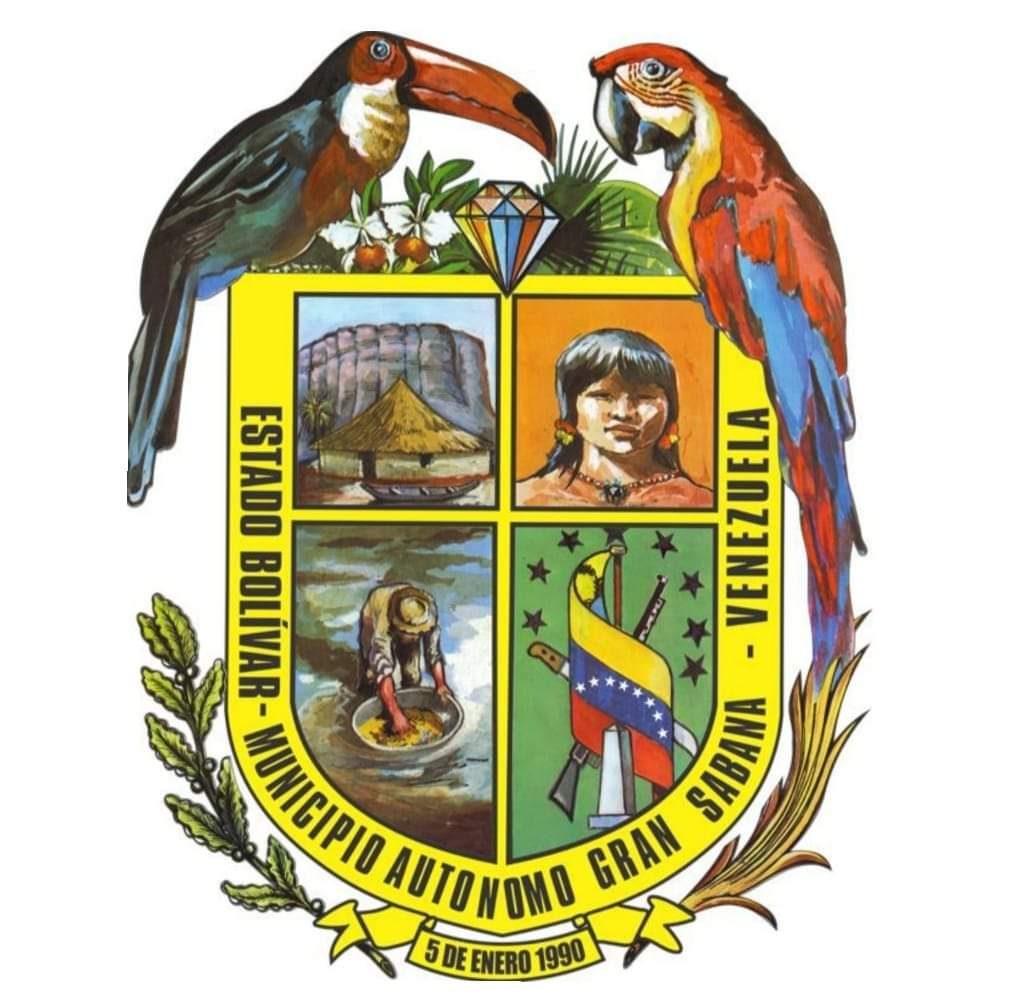
- Flag Coat of arms

- Location in Bolívar

- Location in Venezuela
- Coordinates: 5°12′08″N 61°45′14″W
- Country: Venezuela
- State: Bolívar
- Municipal seat: Santa Elena de Uairén

Government
  - Mayor: Manuel De Jesús Vallez (PSUV)

Area
  - Total: 34,014.6 km^{2} (13,133.1 sq mi)

Population (2011)
  - Total: 28,450
  - Density: 0.8364/km^{2} (2.166/sq mi)
- Time zone: UTC−4 (VET)
- Area code(s): 0289

The Gran Sabana Municipality is one of the 11 municipalities (municipios) that makes up the Venezuelan state of Bolívar and, according to the 2011 census by the National Institute of Statistics of Venezuela, the municipality has a population of 28,450. The town of Santa Elena de Uairén is the shire town of the Gran Sabana Municipality.

== Demographics ==
The Gran Sabana Municipality, according to a 2007 population estimate by the National Institute of Statistics of Venezuela, has a population of 34,095 (up from 27,027 in 2000). This amounts to 2.2% of the state's population. The municipality's population density is 1.03 inhabitants per square kilometre (2.7/sq mi). As of 2011, the Gran Sabana Municipality has amongst the highest proportions of indigenous people in the country, roughly 77.67%, the majority of which being Pemon.

== Government ==
The mayor of the Gran Sabana Municipality is Emilio González, elected in the 2017 Venezuelan municipal elections. He replaced Manuel Vallés shortly after the elections. The municipality is divided into one (two if you count the Capital Gran Sabana section) parish (Ikabarú).

== See also ==
- Gran Sabana
- Santa Elena de Uairén
- Bolívar
- Angel Falls
- Canaima National Park
- Municipalities of Venezuela
