= Cantaura massacre =

- Date: October 4, 1982
- Location: Cantaura, Venezuela
- Type: Massacre
- Target: Frente Américo Silva
- Participants: Air Force of Venezuela
- Deaths: 23

The Cantaura massacre was an incident on 4 October 1982 in which a guerrillas' camp near Cantaura in Venezuela's state of Anzoátegui was destroyed, and 23 of the 41 guerrilla fighters of the Frente Américo Silva killed.

The guerrillas, mostly from Banera Roja, were meeting with student leaders, but the party had been infiltrated by government agents. The camp was encircled by 1,500 Venezuelan soldiers while the air force were called in and four aircraft dropped seventeen 250-pound (110 kg) bombs onto the camp. Those killed were men and women aged 16 to 30.

After the Bolivarian Revolution the new government sought to prosecute those involved in the killings. A formal investigation was opened in 2009 and the bodies of fifteen of those killed were exhumed in 2011 for return to the victim's families. The families had been too afraid to request the bodies at the time of the massacre for fear of persecution.

== See also ==
- List of massacres in Venezuela
