= Cantaura =

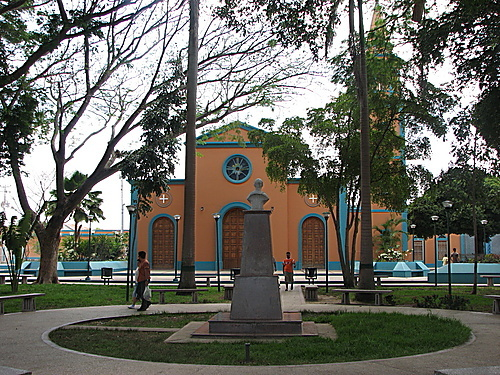

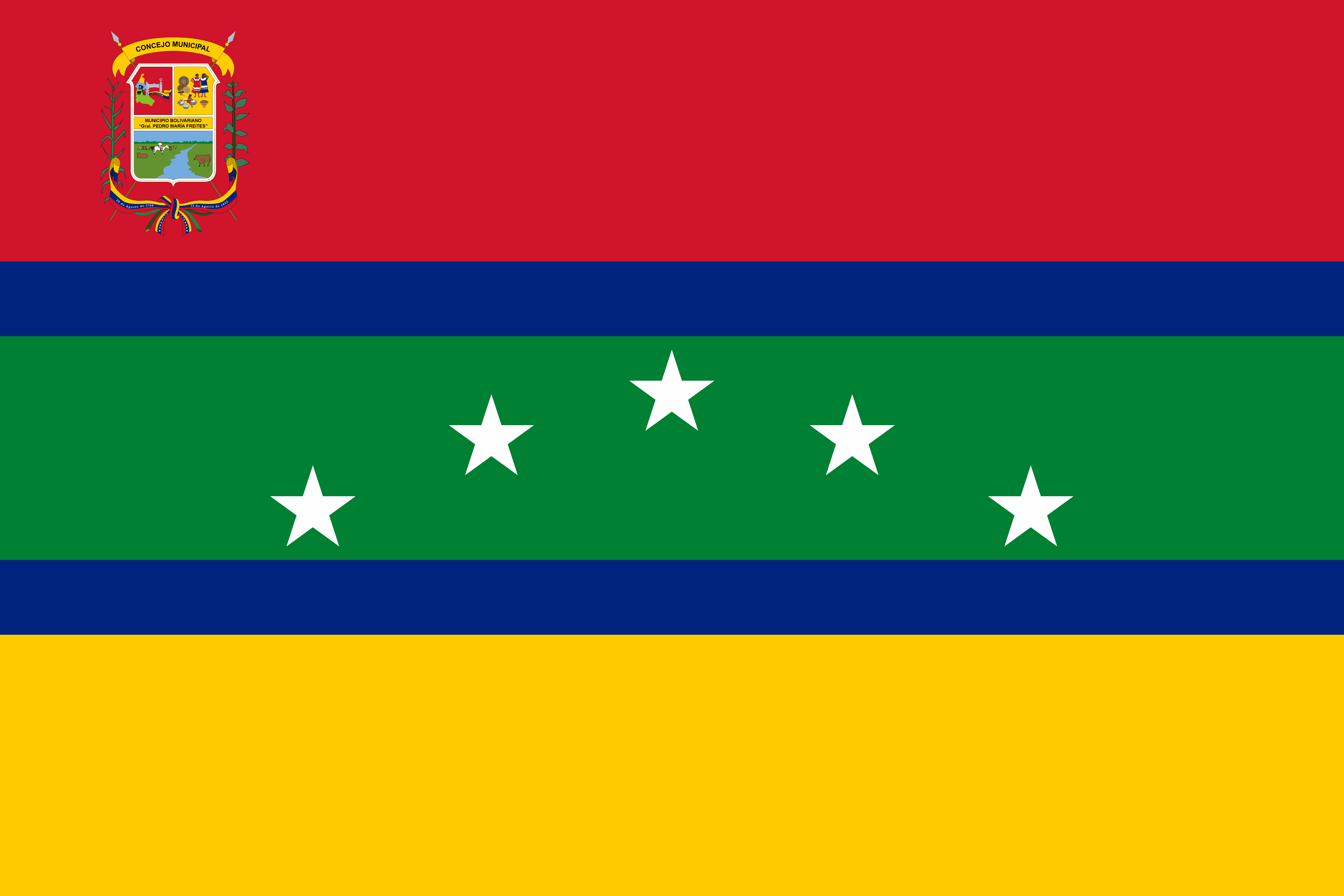
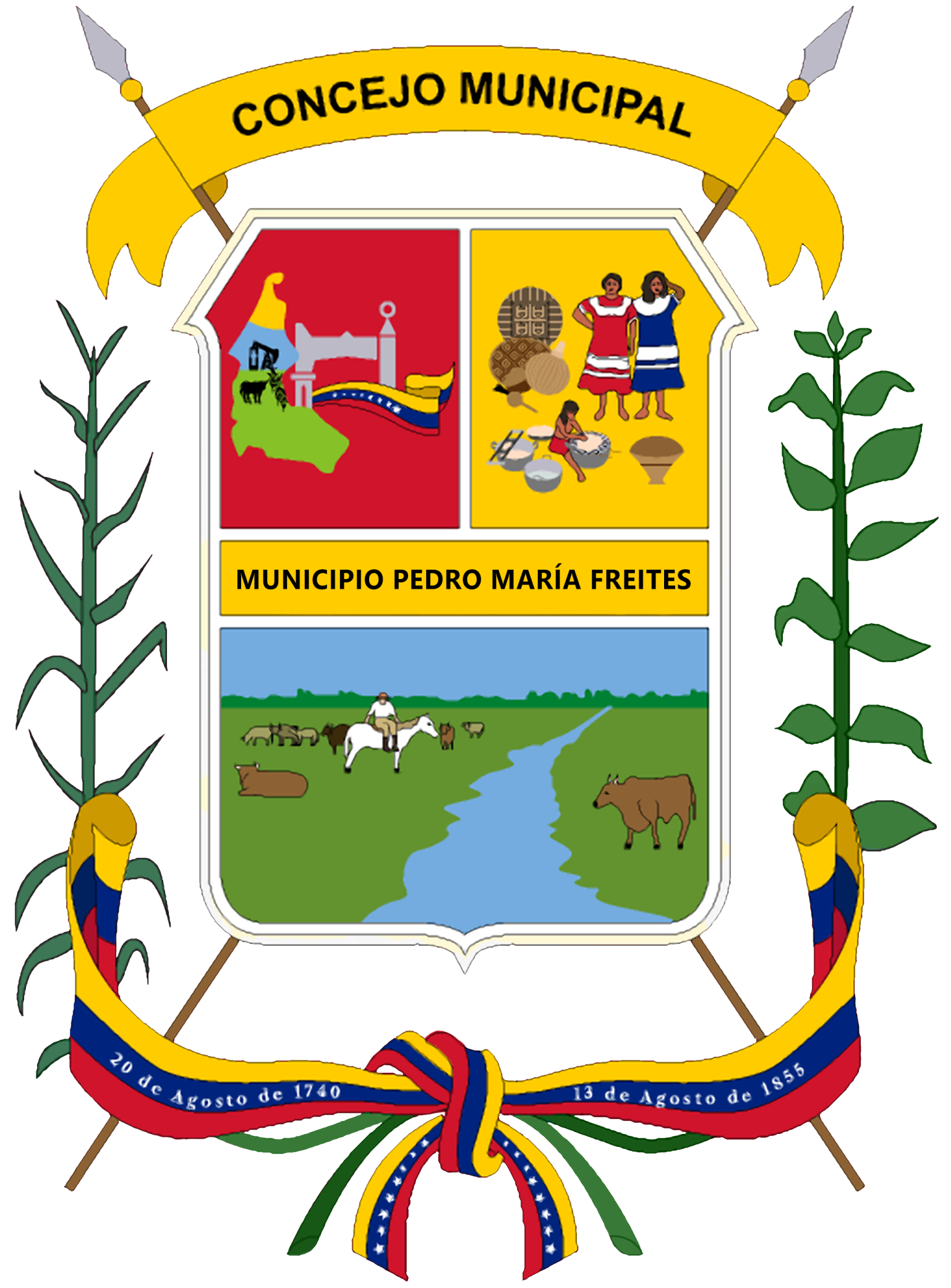
- Flag Coat of arms

- Location within Venezuela
- Coordinates: 9°18′40″N 64°21′34″W
- Country: Venezuela
- State: Anzoátegui
- Municipality: Pedro María Freites Municipality
- Founded: August 20, 1740
- Elevation: 261 m (856 ft)

Population
  - Total: 42,000
  - Demonym: Cantaurense
- Time zone: UTC−4 (VET)
- Postal code: 6007
- Area code: 0282
- Climate: Aw
- Website: www.alcaldiadefreites.gov.ve

Cantaura (Spanish pronunciation: [kanˈtawɾa]) is a city in the state of Anzoátegui, Venezuela. It is the capital of Pedro María Freites Municipality.

== History ==
Cantaura, was founded previously under its old name Chamariapa on August 20, 1740, by Fray Fernando Jiménez, Franciscan missionary.

== See also ==
- Cantaura Massacre
