= El Amparo, Apure =

El Amparo
- Location within Venezuela
- Coordinates: 7°6′0″N 70°46′0″W
- Country: Venezuela
- State: Apure
- Municipality: Páez Municipality
- Time zone: UTC−4 (VET)

El Amparo is a town located in Páez Municipality, Apure of Venezuela. It is located on the border with Colombia, on the banks of the Arauca River.

The Massacre of El Amparo took place near the town.

== See also ==
- List of cities and towns in Venezuela
