= Arauca River =

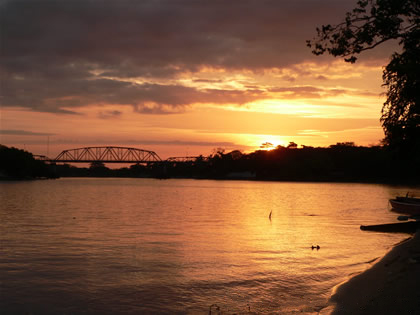
- The Arauca at sunset with the Jose Antonio Paez bridge, near the city of Arauca

- Location of mouth in Venezuela

Location
- Countries: Colombia; Venezuela

Physical characteristics
- Source: Páramo del Almorzadero
  - location: Cerrito, Santander, Colombia
  - coordinates: 6°59′26″N 72°42′22″W
  - elevation: 4,000 m (13,000 ft)
- Mouth: Orinoco
  - location: Bolívar, Venezuela
  - coordinates: 7°29′46″N 66°31′06″W
  - elevation: 22 m (72 ft)
- Length: 1,050 km (650 mi)
- Basin size: 31,000 km^{2} (12,000 sq mi)

The Arauca River (Spanish: Río Arauca) rises in the Andes Mountains of north-central Colombia and ends at the Orinoco in Venezuela. For part of its run it is the boundary between Colombia and Venezuela. The major city on its banks is Arauca, Colombia and El Amparo, Venezuela.

== Course ==
The Arauca is typical of the rivers that flow east across the Llanos Orientales starting as a swift mountain stream and becoming wider and slower as it crosses the plains.

It starts high in the Andes, in the Páramo del Almorzadero at over 4,000 metres (13,000 ft) above sea level. Initially, it is called the Chitagá, and it receives inflows from the Carabo and the Cacota, and then twists its course towards the east joining with the Culaga and the Bochaga. Its name then changes to the Margua. The Negro, the Colorado, and the San Lorenzo then flow into it.

From the right bank come the Cubugón and the Cobar from the Sierra Nevada de Chita. The Tunebo Indians call this stretch the Sarare. Now flowing across a flat zone, it divides to form the Charo Island. Serving as the demarcation line between Colombia and Venezuela for 296 kilometres (184 mi) of border, on the right side, the Royata, Bojabá and Banadía flow in, and on the left the Cutufí enters.

From then on, it takes the name Arauca in tribute to the Araucana tribe, which inhabited the mountain ranges of the upper course and belonged to the great Arawak family. Now in the savannas of the Llanos Orientales, it often becomes a braided river with the main course splitting to form the subsidiary channels, such as the one called Agua Limón.

Various subsidiary channels are used extensively for transportation from the town of Arauca down to its mouth on the Orinoco. The course of the river is 80 percent navigable in small boats.
