= List of rivers in Venezuela =

This is a list of rivers in Venezuela.

== By drainage basin ==
This list is arranged by drainage basin, with respective tributaries indented under each larger stream's name.

=== Atlantic Ocean ===
==== Amazon Basin ====
- Amazon River (Brazil)
  - Rio Negro
    - Casiquiare canal
      - Baria River
        - Yatuá River
      - Siapa River
      - Pasimoni River
    - Guainía River
      - Conorochite River

==== Essequibo Basin ====
- Essequibo River (Guyana)
  - Mazaruni River (Guyana)
    - Cuyuni River
      - Wenamu River
      - Corumpo River
      - Yuruarí River
      - Supamo River
    - Kamarang River

==== Orinoco Basin ====
- Orinoco River
  - Rio Grande (distributary, empties into the Boca Grande)
    - Barima River
    - Amacuro River
    - Cuyubini River
    - Aguirre River
  - Caño Araguao (distributary)
  - Caño Mariusa (distributary)
  - Caño Macareo (distributary)
  - Caño Tucupita (distributary)
  - Caño Mánamo (distributary, empties into the Gulf of Paria)
    - Tigre River
      - Morichal Largo River
    - Urecoa River
  - Caroní River
    - Paragua River
      - Asa River
      - Uinebona River
      - Carutu River
    - Carrao River
      - Churún River
    - Icabarú River
    - Acaruay River
    - Aponguao River
    - Cuquenán River
  - Caris River
  - Aro River
    - Arisa River
    - Carapo River
  - Pao River
  - Guaicupa River
  - Cabrutica River
  - Mapire River
  - Caura River
    - Mato River
    - Erebato River
    - Merevarí River
  - Zuata River
  - Iguana River
  - Cuchivero River
  - Manapire River
  - Guariquito River
    - Mocapra River
  - Apure River
    - Guárico River
      - Orituco River
        - Memo River
    - Portuguesa River
      - Guanare River
        - Caño Guanaparo or Guanare Viejo
        - Bocono River
      - Tiznados River
      - Pao River
      - Cojedes River
        - San Carlos River
          - Tinaco River
        - Turbio River
      - Acarigua River
      - Quache River
    - Caucagua River
    - Masparro River
    - Santo Domingo River
    - Pagüey River
    - Canagua River
    - Caparo River
    - Sarare River
    - Uribante River
  - Arauca River
    - Cunaviche River
    - Matiyure River
      - Orichuna River or Arichuna
  - Chiviripa River
  - Capanaparo River
  - Suapure River
  - Cinaruco River
  - Parguaza River
  - Meta River
  - Sipapo River
    - Cuao River
    - Autana River
    - Guayapo River
  - Atabapo River
  - Ventuari River
    - Parú River
    - Marieta River
    - Manapiare River
  - Cunucunuma River
  - Casiquiare canal (distributary)
  - Padamo River
    - Matacuni River
  - Ocamo River
  - Mavaca River
  - Manaviche River

=== Gulf of Paria ===
- Caño Mánamo listed under Orinoco
- Guanipa River
  - Amana River
- San Juan River
  - Guarapiche River

=== Caribbean Sea ===
- Manzanares River
- Neverí River
  - Aragua River
- Unare River
  - Güere River
  - Tamanaco River
- Guapo River
- Tuy River
- Capayo River
- Aroa River
- Yaracuy River
- Tocuyo River
- Hueque River
- Monay River
  - Pedregal River
- Maticora River
- Limón River
  - Socuy River
  - Guasare River

==== Lake Maracaibo ====
- Motatán River
- Chama River
- Escalante River
- Catatumbo River
  - Zulia River
    - Pamplonita River (Colombia)
      - Táchira River
  - Tarra River
- Tucuro River
- Apón River
- Palmar River

=== Lake Valencia ===
- Tapatapa River or El Limon
- Güey River
- Turmero River
- Aragua River
- Tocorón River
- Güigüe River
- Caño Central
  - Cabriales River
- Los Guayos River
- Guacara River
- Ereigue River
- Cura River
- Mariara River

== See also ==
- List of rivers of the Americas by coastline
