= Autana River =

Location
- Country: Venezuela

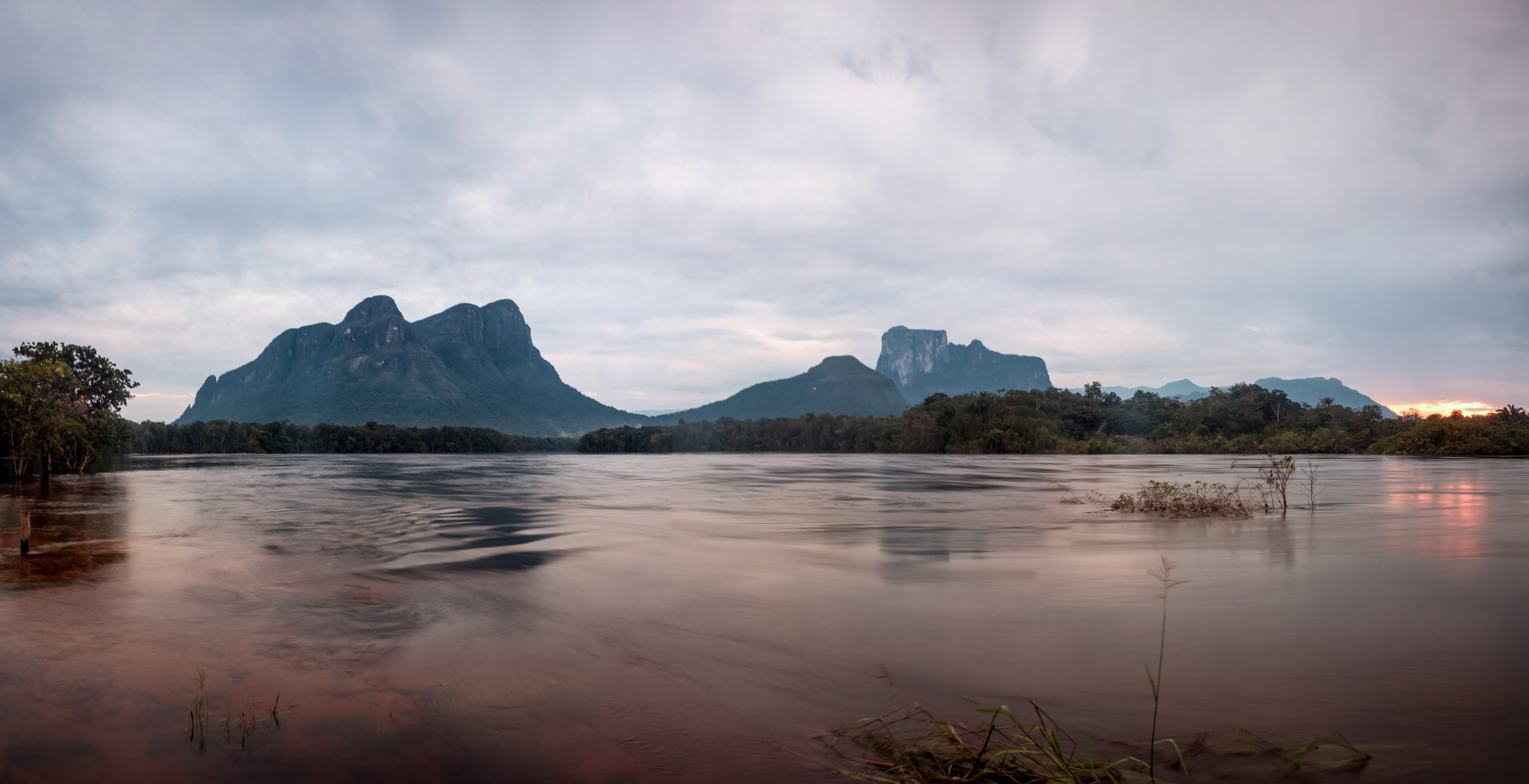

The Autana River (Río Autana) is a blackwater river of Venezuela, a tributary of the Sipapo River in the middle Orinoco River basin.

== Course ==
Its headwaters lie in the western portion of the Guiana Shield, north of the Ventuari River. It flows in a generally westerly direction and drains into the right margin of the Sipapo River near Lake Guiripipi (Laguna Guiripipi). One of its major tributaries is the Caño Negro, which enters from the right at 4°46′44″N 67°24′45″W.

== See also ==
- List of rivers of Venezuela
- Autana Municipality
