= El Limón River =

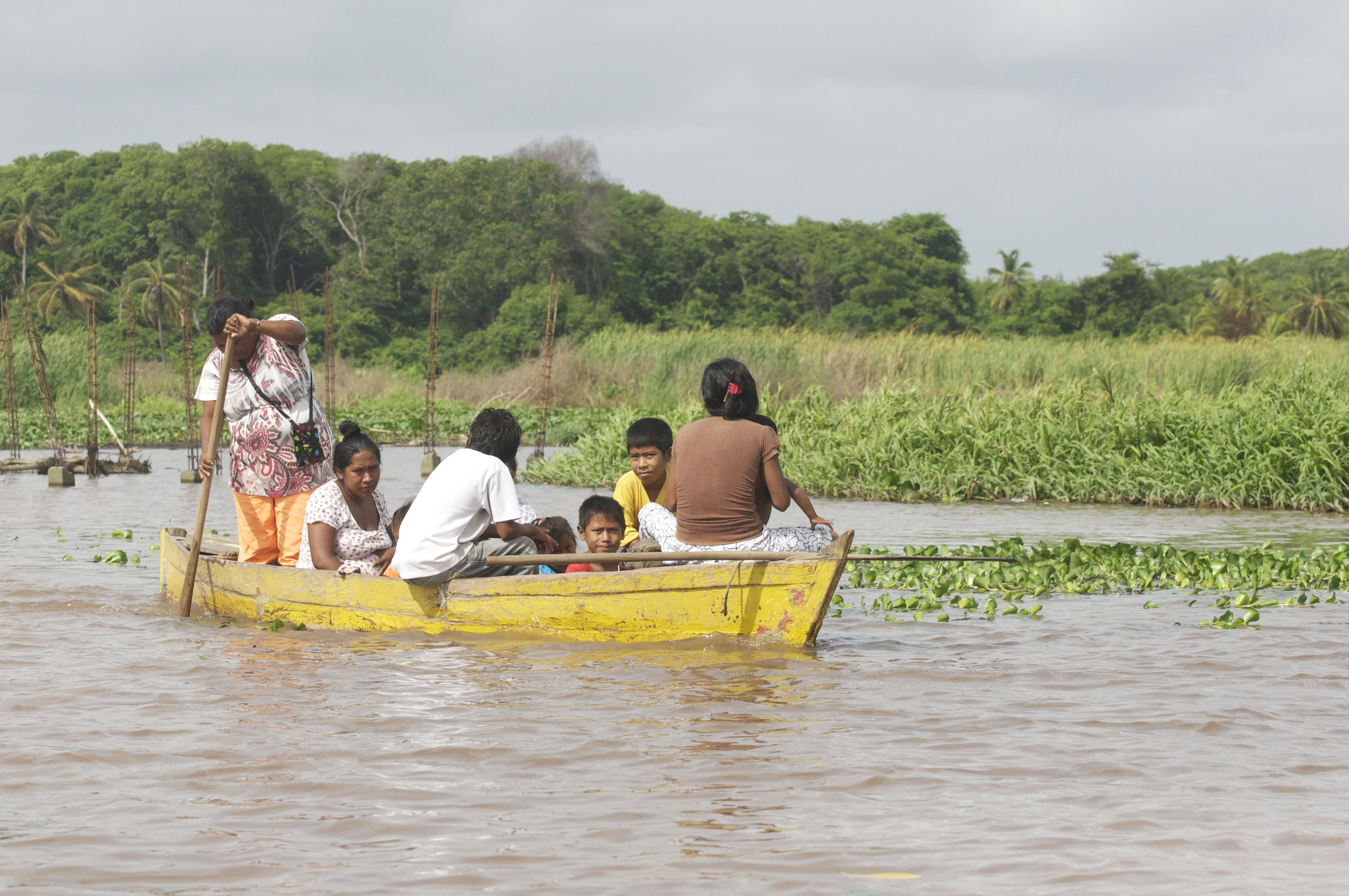
- The Rio Limón River being traversed

Location
- Country: Venezuela

Physical characteristics
- Mouth: Lake Maracaibo
  - location: Near San Rafael del Moján
  - coordinates: 10°59′51″N 71°46′30″W

The El Limón River is a river in Zulia in northwestern Venezuela. It flows into the Caribbean Sea. Tributaries include the Socuy River and Guasare River.

== See also ==
- List of rivers of Venezuela
