= Cristóbal Diatristán de Acuña =

Spanish Jesuit missionary (born 1597)

Cristóbal Diatristán de Acuña, SJ (1597 – c. 1676) was a Spanish Jesuit missionary and explorer.

== Biography ==
He was born at Burgos in Spain. He was admitted a Jesuit in 1612, and afterwards sent on mission work to Chile and Peru, where he became rector of the college of Cuenca. In 1639 he accompanied Pedro Teixeira in his second exploration of the Amazon, in order to take scientific observations, and draw up a report for the Spanish government. The journey lasted ten months; and on the explorer's arrival in Belém, Acuña prepared his narrative, while awaiting a ship for Europe. The king of Spain, Philip IV, received the author coldly, and, it is said even tried to suppress his book, fearing that the Portuguese, who had just revolted from Spain (1640), would profit by its information. After occupying the positions of procurator of the Jesuits at Rome and censor (calificador) of the Spanish Inquisition at Madrid, Acuña returned to South America, where he died, probably soon after 1675. His Nuevo Descubrimiento del Gran Río de las Amazonas was published at Madrid in 1641; French and English translations (the latter from the French), appeared in 1682 and 1698.

Acuña was the first to describe the Casiquiare canal, a natural canal linking the Amazon and Orinoco Rivers, in 1639.
