= Erebato River =

Location
- Country: Venezuela

Physical characteristics
- Source
  - location: Meseta de Jaua
- Mouth: Caura River
  - coordinates: 5°55′54″N 64°25′41″W

Erebato River is a river of Venezuela, tributary of the Caura River. It is part of the Orinoco River basin.

== See also ==
- List of rivers of Venezuela
