= Casiquiare canal =

River in Venezuela

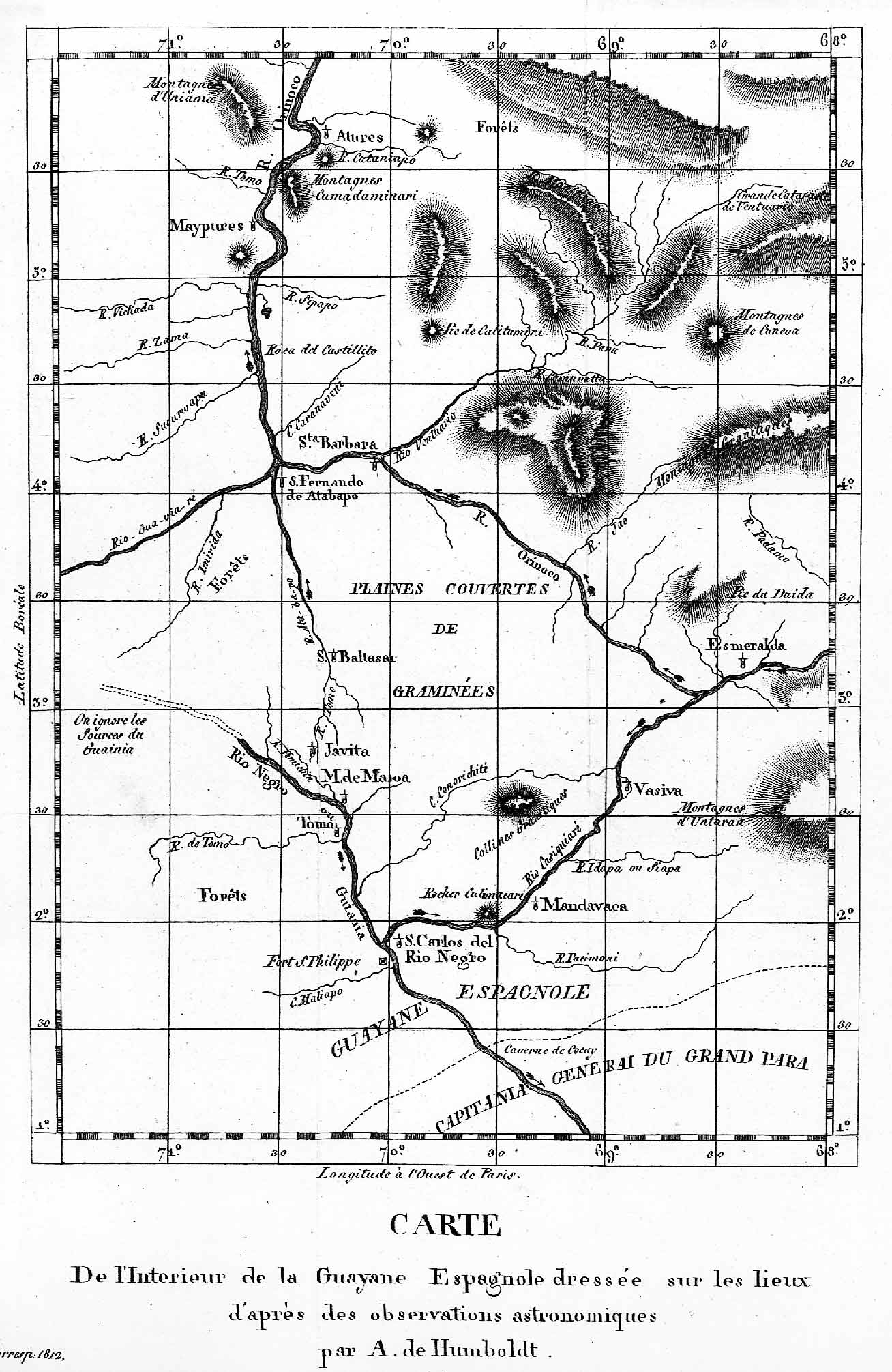
- Map of the Cassiquiare canal based on Alexander von Humboldt's 1799 observations

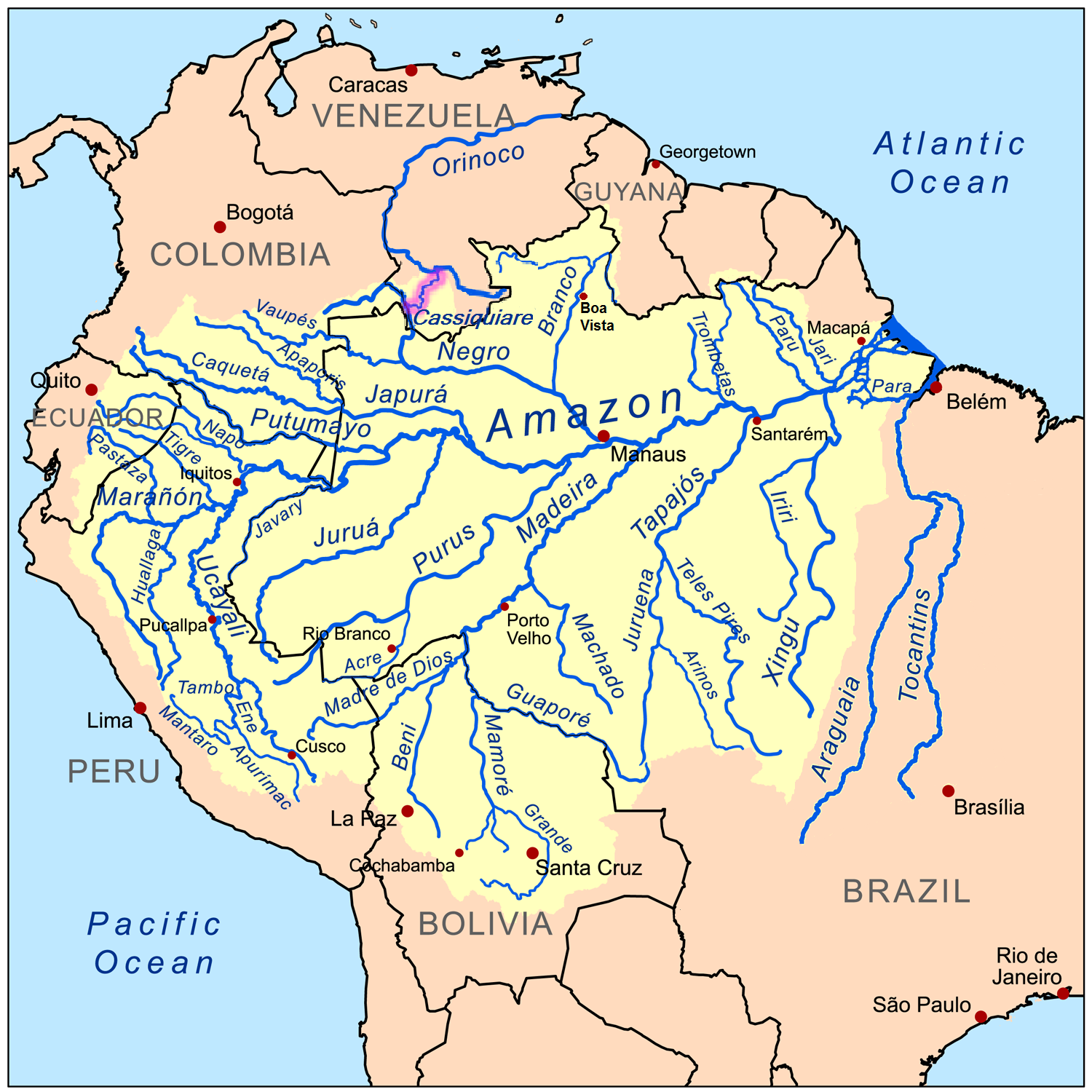
- Location of the Casiquiare (highlighted in purple) within the Amazon Basin

Location
- Country: Venezuela

Physical characteristics
- Source: Orinoco River
  - coordinates: 3°8′18″N 65°52′49″W
  - elevation: 110 m (360 ft)
- Mouth: Rio Negro
  - coordinates: 2°0′5″N 67°5′54″W
  - elevation: 79 m (259 ft)
- Length: 340 km (210 mi)
- Basin size: 42,478 km^{2} (16,401 mi^{2})
- Discharge
  - location: Amazonas, Venezuela (near mouth)
  - average: 2,574.3 m^{3}/s (90,910 cu ft/s)

Basin features
- Tributaries
  - right: Siapa, Yatua

The Casiquiare river or canal (Spanish pronunciation: [kasiˈkjaɾe]) is a natural distributary of the upper Orinoco flowing southward into the Rio Negro in Venezuela. As such, it forms a unique natural canal between the Orinoco and Amazon river systems. It is the world's largest river of the kind that links two major river systems, a so-called bifurcation. The area forms a water divide, more dramatically at regional flood stage.

== Etymology ==
The name Casiquiare, first used in that form by Manuel Román, likely derives from the Ye'kuana language name of the river, Kashishiwadi.

== Discovery ==
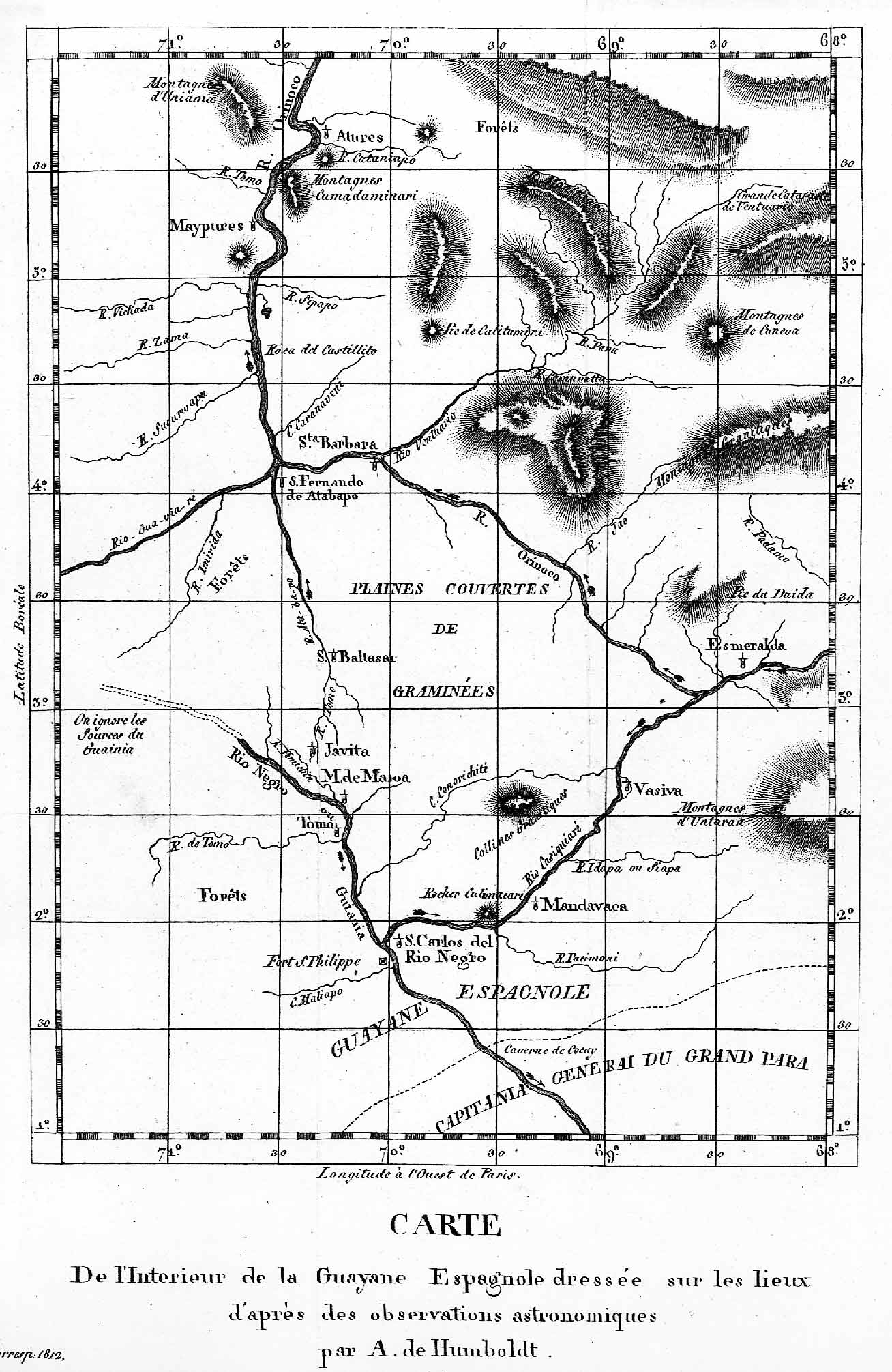
Casiquiare river or channel, connecting the rivers Orinoco and Negro in the Amazonas forest. The map was drafted based on Alexander von Humboldt 1799 survey of the area.

The first European to describe it was Spanish Jesuit missionary and explorer Cristóbal Diatristán de Acuña in 1639. In 1744 a Jesuit priest named Manuel Román, while ascending the Orinoco River in the region of La Esmeralda, met some Portuguese slave-traders from the settlements on the Rio Negro. The Portuguese insisted they were not in Spanish territory but on a tributary of the Amazon River; they invited Román back with them to prove their claim. He accompanied them on their return, by way of the Casiquiare canal, and afterwards retraced his route to the Orinoco. Along the way, he made first contact with the Ye'kuana people, whom he enlisted to help in his journey. Charles Marie de La Condamine, seven months later, was able to give to the Académie française an account of Román's voyage and thus confirm the existence of this waterway.

Little credence was given to Román's statement until it was verified in 1756 by the Spanish boundary-line commission of José Yturriaga and Solano. In 1800 German scientist Alexander von Humboldt and French botanist Aimé Bonpland explored the river. During a 1924–25 expedition, Alexander H. Rice Jr. of Harvard University traveled up the Orinoco, traversed the Casiquiare canal, and descended the Rio Negro to the Amazon at Manaus. It was the first expedition to use aerial photography and shortwave radio for mapping of the region. In 1968 the Casiquiare was navigated by an SRN6 hovercraft during a The Geographical Journal expedition.

== Geography ==
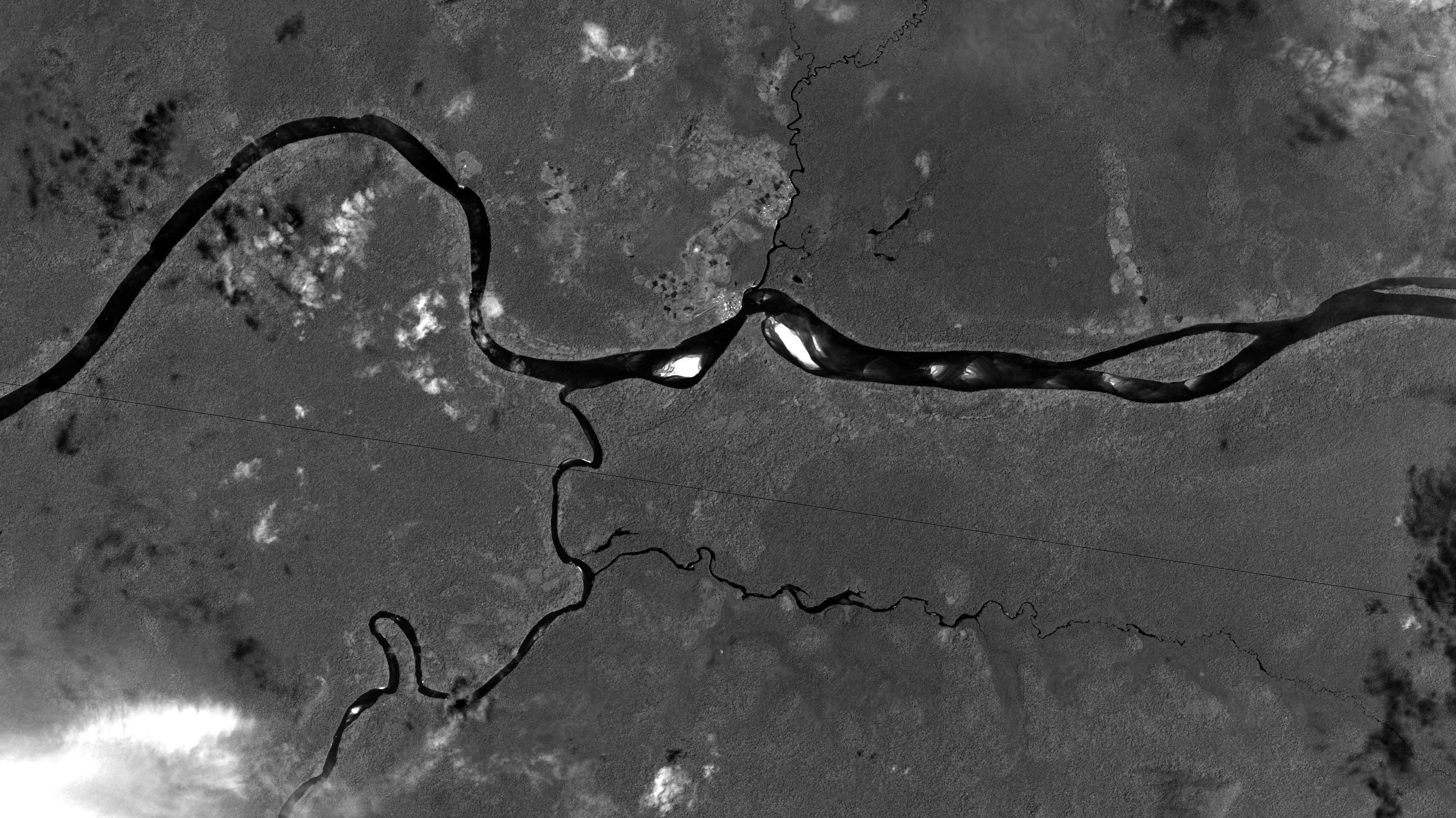
The Casiquiare (bottom left) is separated from the Orinoco

The origin of the Casiquiare at the River Orinoco is 14 kilometres (9 mi) below the mission of La Esmeralda at 3°8′18.5″N 65°52′42.5″W, and about 123 metres (404 ft) above sea level. Its mouth at the Rio Negro, an affluent of the Amazon River, is near the town of San Carlos and is 91 metres (299 ft) above sea level.

The general course is southwest, and its length is about 320 kilometres (200 mi). Its width at its bifurcation with the Orinoco is approximately 90 metres (300 ft), with a current towards the Rio Negro of 0.3 metres per second (0.75 mph). However, as it gains in volume from its numerous tributary streams its velocity increases, and in the wet season the stream reaches 2.2 metres per second (5 mph), even 3.6 metres per second (8 mph) in certain stretches. It broadens considerably as it approaches its mouth, where it is about 533 metres (1,750 ft) wide. The volume of water the Casiquiare captures from the Orinoco is small in comparison to what it accumulates in its course. Nevertheless, the geological processes are ongoing, and evidence points to a slow and gradual increase in the size of Casiquiare. It is likely that stream capture is in progress, i.e. what currently is the uppermost Orinoco basin, including Cunucunuma River, eventually will be entirely diverted by the Casiquiare into the Amazon basin.

In flood time, it is said to have a second connection with the Rio Negro by a branch, which it throws off to the westward, called the Itinivini, which leaves it at a point about 80 kilometres (50 mi) above its mouth. In the dry season it has shallows and is obstructed by sandbanks, a few rapids, and granite rocks. Its shores are densely wooded, and the soil is more fertile than along the Rio Negro. The general slope of the plains through which the canal runs is southwest, but those of the Rio Negro slope southeast.

The Casiquiare is not a sluggish canal on a flat tableland but a rapid river which, if its upper waters had not found contact with the Orinoco, perhaps by cutting back, would belong entirely to the Rio Negro branch of the Amazon. To the west of the Casiquiare, there is a much shorter and easier portage between the Orinoco and Amazon basins, called the isthmus of Pimichin, which is reached by ascending the Temi branch of the Atabapo River, an affluent of the Orinoco. Although the Temi is somewhat obstructed, it is believed that it could be made navigable for small craft. The isthmus is 10 miles (16 km) across, with undulating ground, nowhere over 15 metres (50 ft) high, with swamps and marshes. In the early 20th century, it was much used for the transit of large canoes, which were hauled across it from the Temi River and reached the Rio Negro by a little stream called the Pimichin.

== Hydrographic divide ==
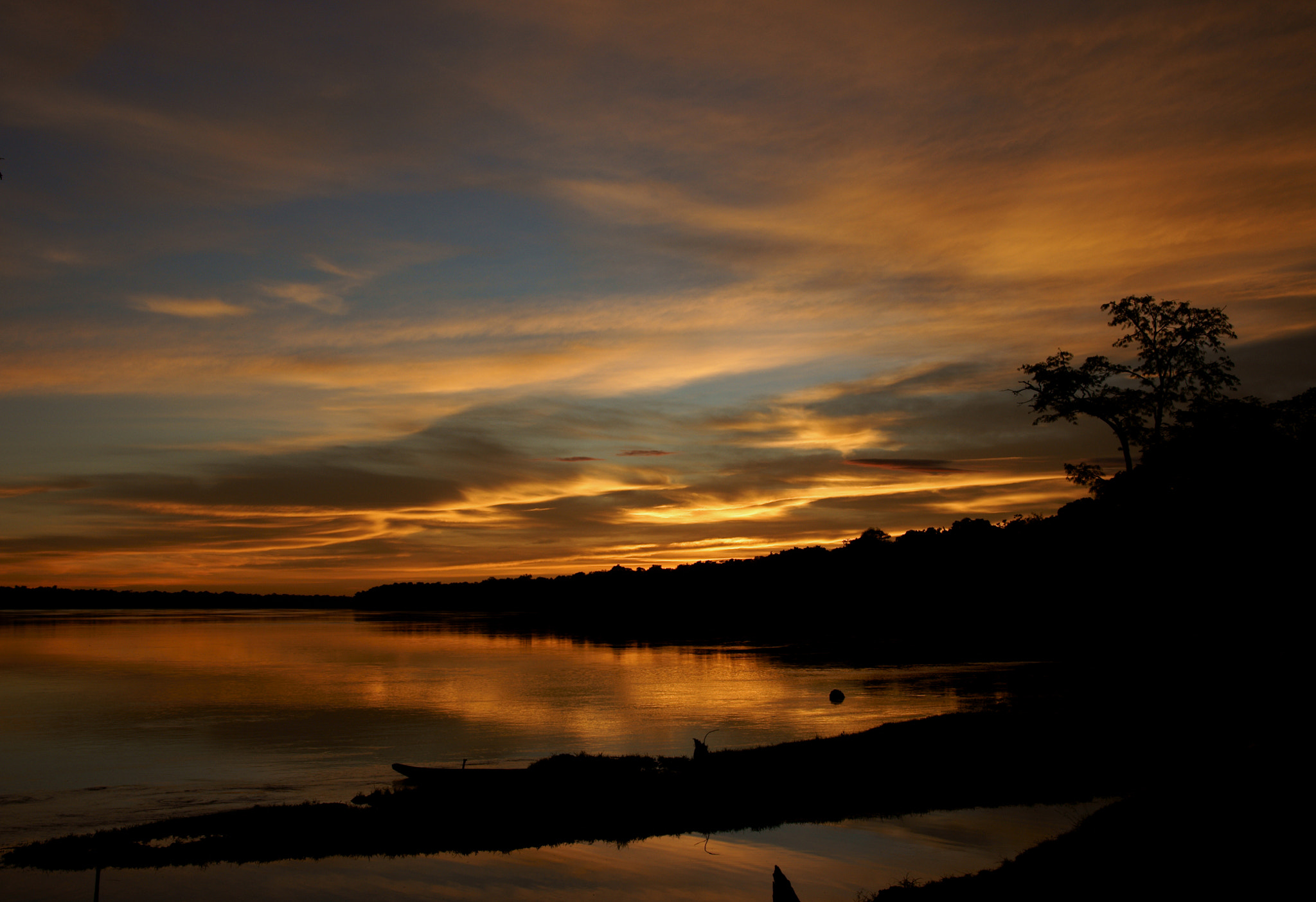
Sunset on the Casiquiare River, in the State of Amazonas (Venezuela)

The Casiquiare canal – Orinoco River hydrographic divide is a representation of the water divide that delineates the separation between the Orinoco Basin and the Amazon Basin. (The Orinoco Basin flows west–north–northeast into the Caribbean; the Amazon Basin flows east into the western Atlantic in the northeast of Brazil.)

Essentially the river divide is a west-flowing, upriver section of the Orinoco with an outflow to the south into the Amazon Basin. This named outflow is the Casiquiare canal, which, as it heads downstream (southerly), picks up speed and also accumulates water volume. The greatest manifestation of the divide is during floods. During flood stage, the Casiquiare's main outflow point into the Rio Negro is supplemented by an overflow that is a second, minor, entry river bifurcation into the Rio Negro and upstream from its major, common low-water entry confluence with the Rio Negro. At flood, the river becomes an area flow source, far more than a narrow confined river.

The water divide is a "south-bank Orinoco River strip" at the exit point of the Orinoco, also the origin of the Casiquiare canal. However, during the Orinoco's flood stage, that single, simply defined "origin of the canal" is turned into a region, and an entire strip along the southern bank of the Orinoco River.

== See also ==
- Crypturellus casiquiare, the barred tinamou.
