= Canagua River =

Location
- Country: Venezuela

Physical characteristics
- Mouth: Apure River
  - coordinates: 7°58′14″N 69°34′17″W

Canagua River is a river of Venezuela. It is part of the Orinoco River basin.

== See also ==
- List of rivers of Venezuela
