= Matacuni River =

Coordinates: 3.0369°N 65.2206°W

Location
- Country: Venezuela

Matacuni River is a river of Venezuela. It is part of the Orinoco River basin.

== See also ==
- List of rivers of Venezuela
