= Cuquenán River =

Coordinates: 4.7296°N 61.5195°W

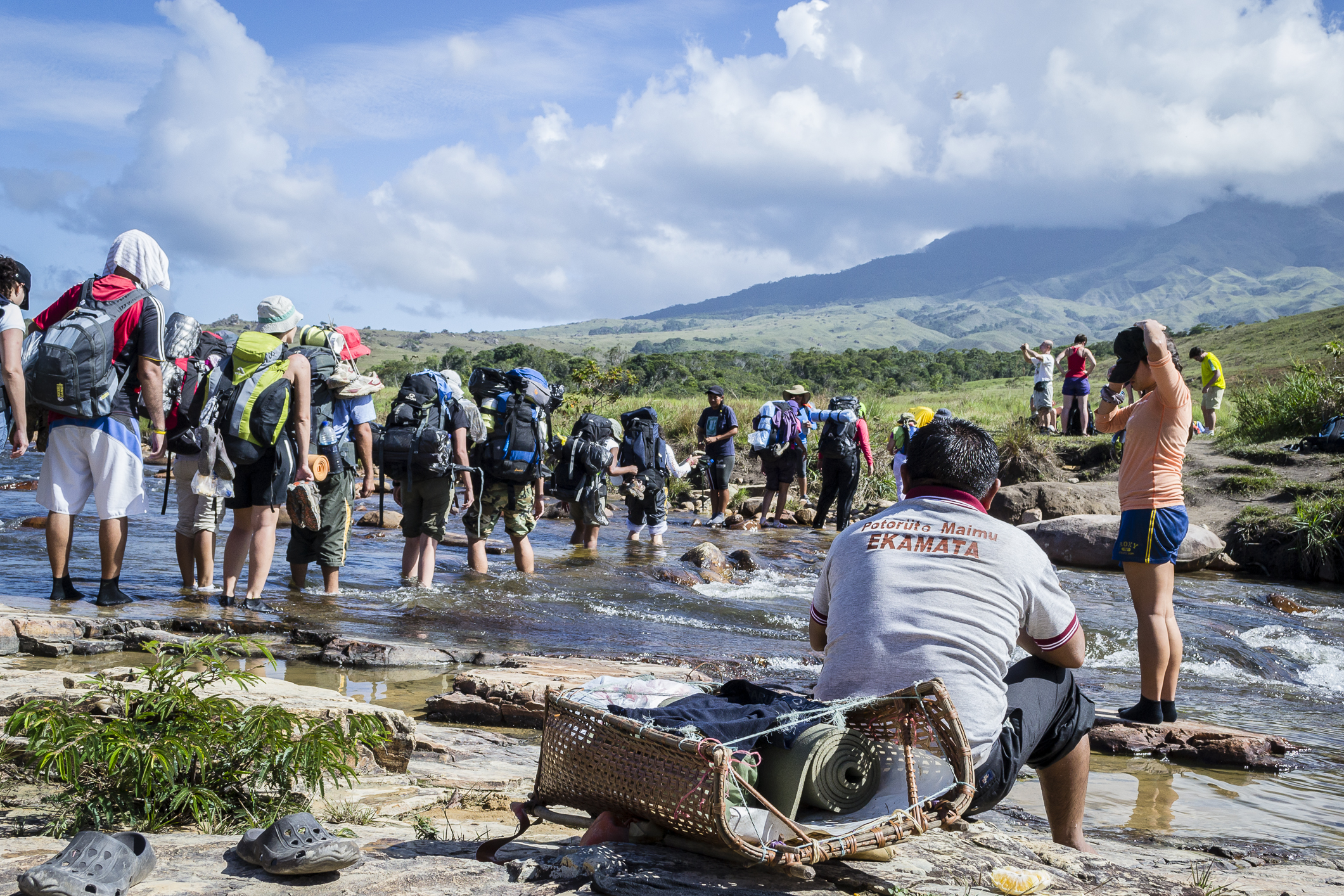

Location
- Country: Venezuela

Physical characteristics
- Length: 190.94 km (118.64 mi)

Cuquenán River is a river of Venezuela. It is part of the Orinoco river basin.

== See also ==
- List of rivers in Venezuela
