= Amana River =

Coordinates: 9°45′26″N 62°40′23″W

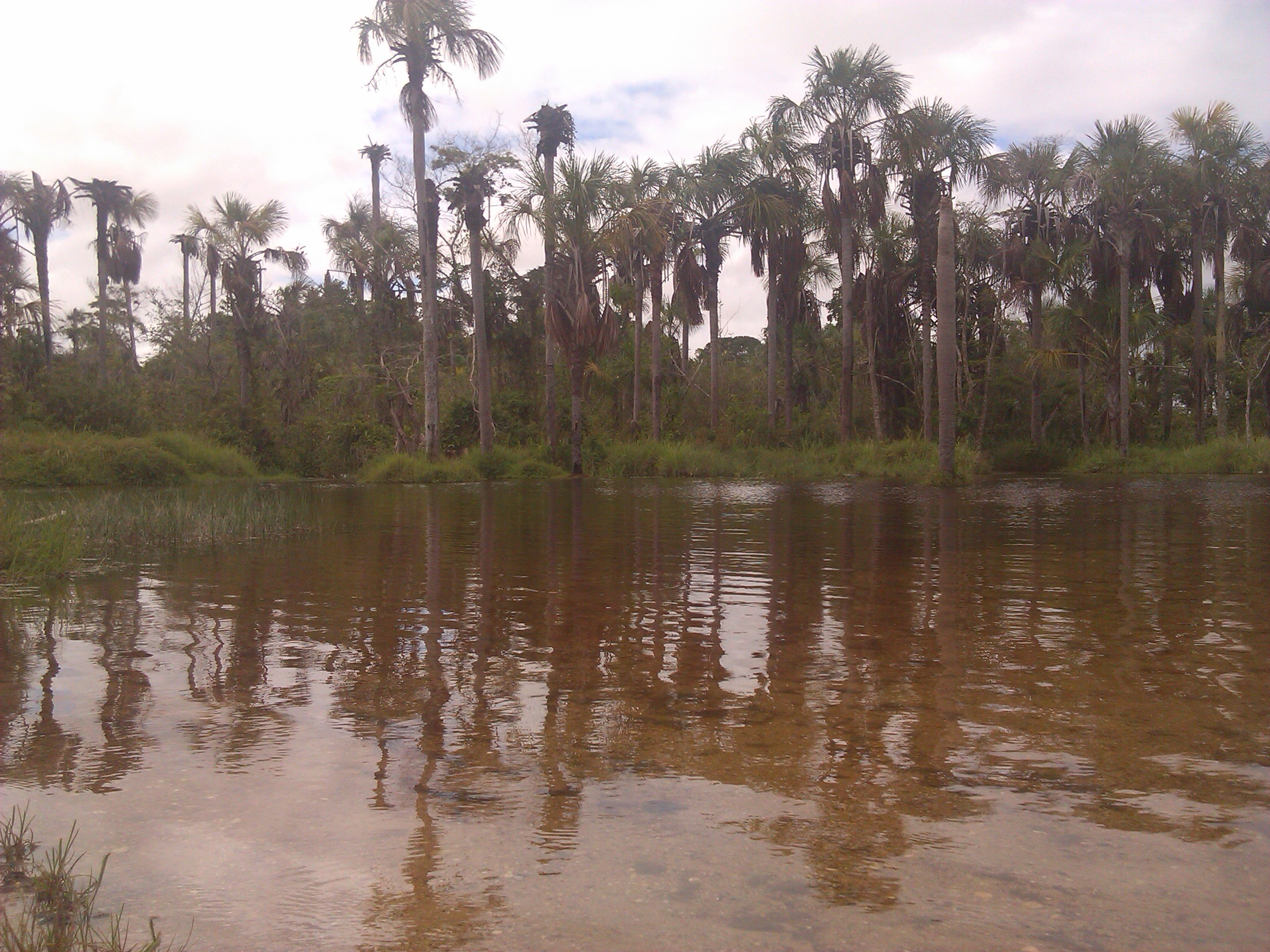

Location
- Country: Venezuela

Physical characteristics
- Mouth
  - location: Gulf of Paria, via the Guanipa River

Amana River is a river of north-eastern Venezuela. It flows into the Gulf of Paria, via the Guanipa River.

== See also ==
- List of rivers of Venezuela
