= El Guapo =

El Guapo (Spanish for "The Handsome") or Guapo may refer to:

== Arts and entertainment ==
- El Guapo (band), later Supersystem, an American band
- Guapo (band), a British art rock band
- El Guapo, a Marvel Comics character in the superhero team X-Statix
- El Guapo, a fictional character and the main antagonist in the 1986 film Three Amigos
- El Guapo, gaming alias of the young Sylvester Dodd in Scorpion (TV series). First mentioned in season 1, episode 13 - “Kill Screen.”

== Nickname or stage name ==
- Rich Garcés (born 1971), American baseball pitcher
- David Guapo, David Callejón (born 1981), Spanish comedian and singer
- Bas Rutten (born 1965), Dutch-American actor and MMA fighter

== Places ==
- El Guapo, Miranda, Venezuela
- Guapo River, Venezuela
- Guapo, a village in Point Fortin, Trinidad and Tobago
