= Zuata River =

Coordinates: 07°55′02″N 65°26′15″W

Location
- Country: Venezuela

Zuata River is a river of Venezuela. It is part of the Orinoco River basin.

== See also ==
- List of rivers of Venezuela
