= Parú River =

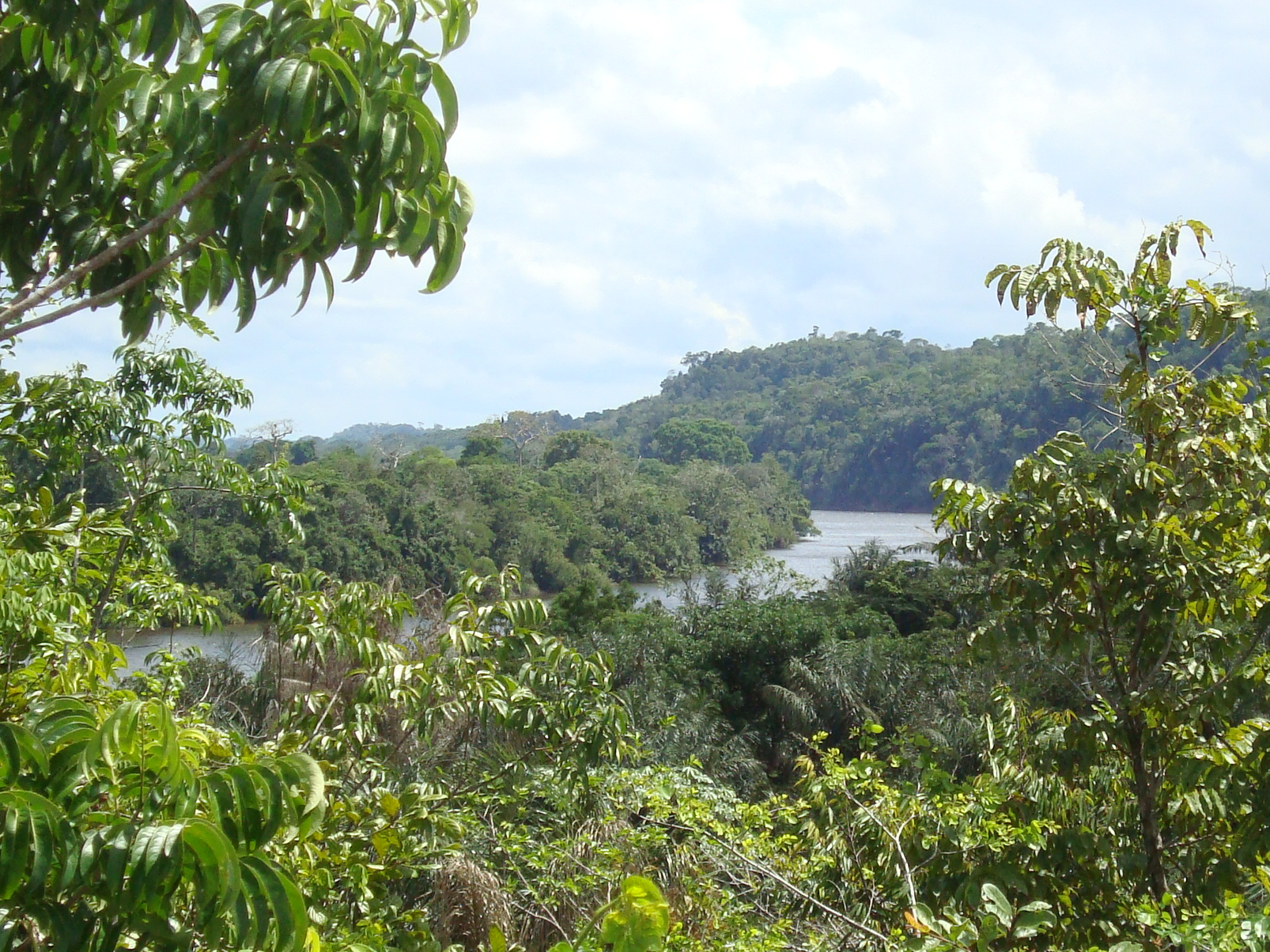

Location
- Country: Venezuela

Physical characteristics
- Mouth: Ventuari River
  - coordinates: 4°23′14″N 66°15′51″W

Parú River is a river of Venezuela. It is part of the Orinoco River basin.

== See also ==
- List of rivers of Venezuela
