= Cuao =

Cuao may refer to:

- Cuao River, in Venezuela
- Cuao Massif, in Venezuela
