= Yabaâna-Mainatari language =

Yabaâna-Mainatari language may refer to:

- Yabaâna language
- Mainatari language
