= Pagüey River =

Coordinates: 7.9950°N 69.5328°W

Location
- Country: Venezuela

Pagüey River is a river of Venezuela. It is part of the Orinoco River basin.

== See also ==
- List of rivers of Venezuela
