= Boconó River =

Location
- Country: Venezuela

Boconó River is a river of Venezuela. It is part of the Orinoco River basin. It was subject to the Cojedes-Sarare Irrigation System project in 1962, which led to the irrigation of around 148,000 acres of land.

== See also ==
- List of rivers of Venezuela
