= Aponguao River =

Coordinates: 4°48′53″N 61°36′38″W

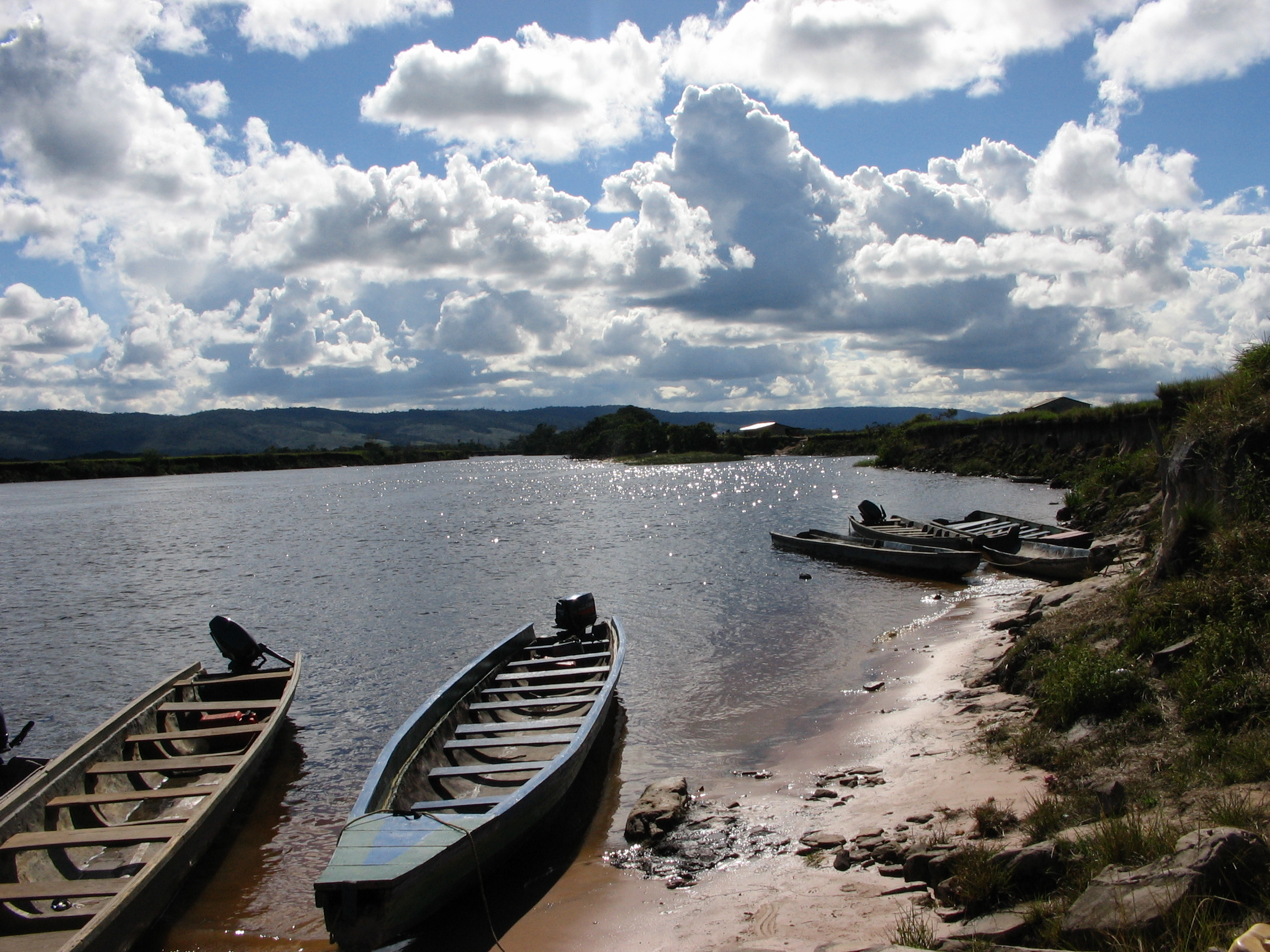

Location
- Country: Venezuela

Aponguao River is a river of Venezuela. It is part of the Orinoco River basin.

== See also ==
- List of rivers of Venezuela
