= Morichal Largo River =

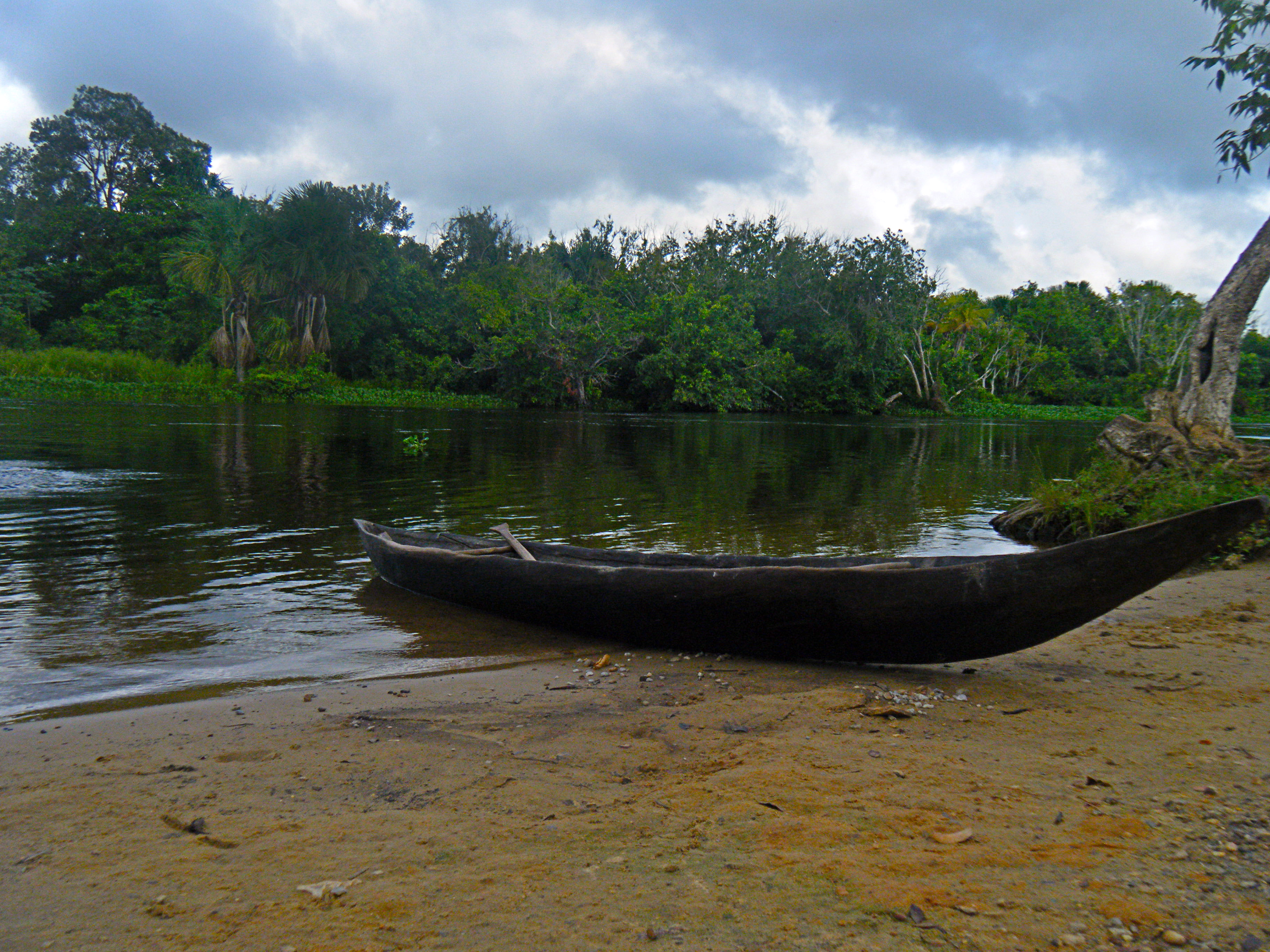

Location
- Country: Venezuela

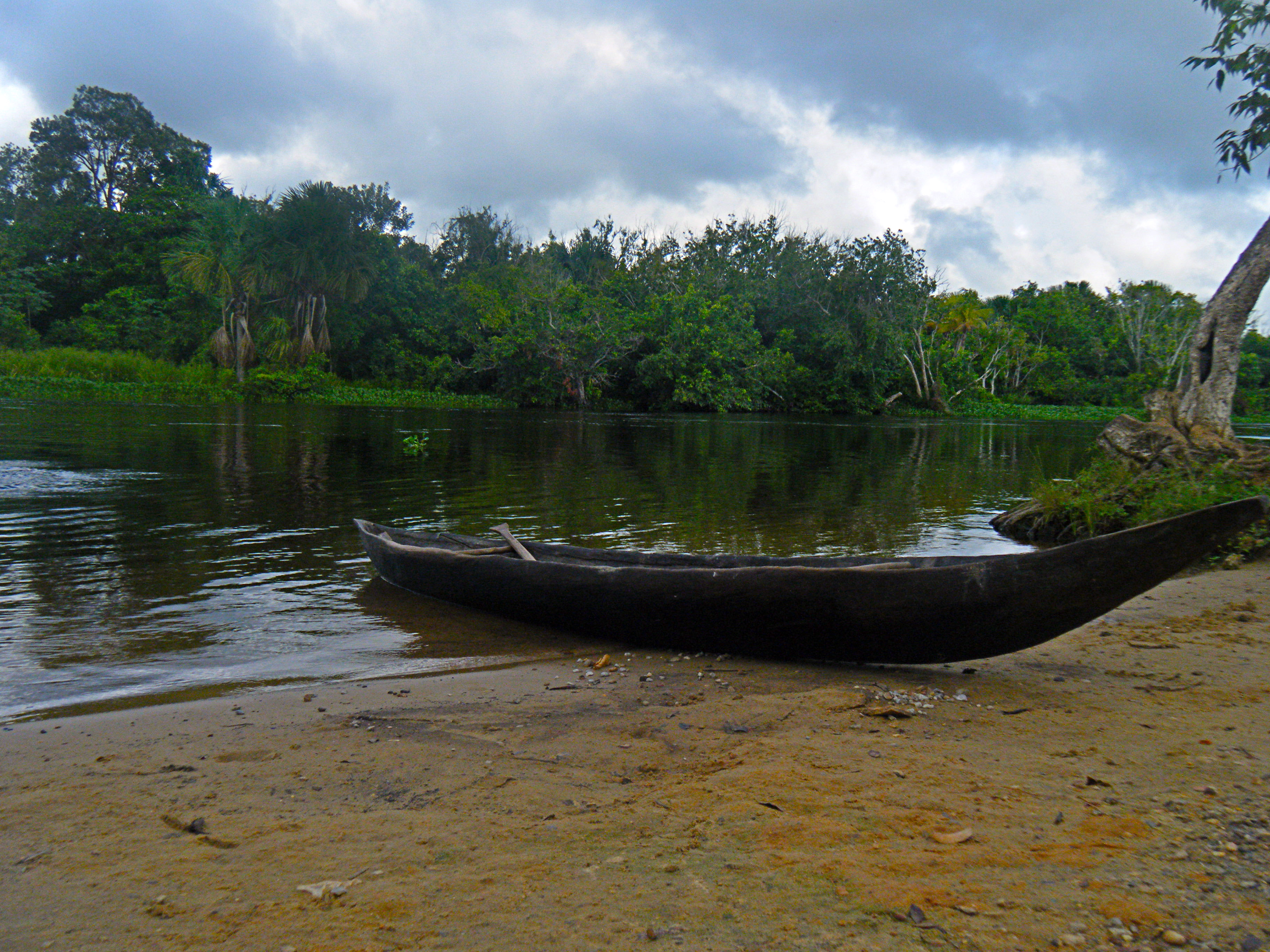
Canoe in Rio Morichal Largo, Monagas, Venezuela.

Morichal Largo River is a river in the North eastern part of Venezuela. It is part of the Orinoco River basin.

== See also ==
- List of rivers of Venezuela
