= Pasimoni River =

- Mouth location in Venezuela
- Native name: Rio Pasimoni (Spanish)

Location
- Country: Venezuela

Physical characteristics
- Mouth
  - coordinates: 1°55′02″N 66°35′58″W

Basin features
- River system: Rio Negro

The Pasimoni River (Spanish: Rio Pasimoni) is a river in the state of Amazonas, Venezuela. It is a tributary of the Casiquiare canal, in turn a tributary of the Rio Negro.

The Pasimoni forms on the northern slope of the Cerro de la Neblina and flows northward to Casiquiare canal. It surrounded by low, poorly drained country. It drains a heavily forested region where the driest months are December to February, but rain is common in the dry season. It is a classic blackwater river with low pH, conductivity, solute and nutrients.

== See also ==
- List of rivers of Venezuela

== Sources ==
- Winemiller, Kirk O.; Taphorn, Donald C.; Barbarino-Duque, Aniello (9 December 1997), "Ecology of Cichla (Cichlidae) in Two Blackwater Rivers of Southern Venezuela", Copeia (4), American Society of Ichthyologists and Herpetologists (ASIH), doi:10.2307/1447287, JSTOR 1447287
