= Padamo River =

Coordinates: 2.8842°N 65.2847°W

- Location within Venezuela

Location
- Country: Venezuela

The Padamo River is a river in Venezuela. It is part of the Orinoco River basin.

== See also ==
- List of rivers of Venezuela
