= Mainatari language =

Extinct Arawakan language of Venezuela

Mainatari
- Maihanatari
- Native to: Venezuela
- Region: Siapa River (Orinoco basin)
- Extinct: (date missing)
- Language family: Arawakan: Northern; Mainatari

Language codes
- ISO 639-3: None (mis)
- Glottolog: yaba1249

Mainatari (Maihanatari) is an extinct Arawakan language of Venezuela that was spoken on the Castaña-Paraná, a tributary of the Siapa River in the Orinoco basin. It is closely related to Yabahana.

== Vocabulary ==
Mainatari is poorly attested. Only 52 words were collected by Johann Natterer in 1831. Mainatari words from Ramirez (2019), cited from Natterer (1831), are given below:

Portuguese gloss (original)	English gloss (translated)	Mainatari
cabeça	head	-júhu-dau
cabelo	hair	-ʃehi
orelha	ear	-tehĩn
olho	eye	-awi
nariz	nose	-ti
boca	mouth	-numa
dente	tooth	-aida
pé	foot	-eti
coxa	thigh	-hohi
mão	hand	-kapi
barriga	belly	-paga
carne	meat	-ʃné
branco (pessoa)	white (person)	jalanai
irmão	brother	baaba, -iejú
irmã	sister	meme, -tegau
anta	tapir	ama-hingo
peixe	fish	maʃatʃi
sol	sun	kamóhu
lua	moon	kamu (?)
estrela	star	siwi
água	water	uni
casa	house	paigü
fogo	fire	ikatʃe
eu	me	no-
quê?	what?	maĩna
cão; animal de criação	dog; domesticated animal	biga-di
anta	tapir	amáhingo
queixada	Tayassu pecari	hapitʃa
veado	deer	anhinga
onça	jaguar	ʃawü
mutum	Cracidae	tumuku
urumutum	Nothocrax urumutum	ʃahimahin
cujubim	Pipile cujubi	koragü
urubu	vulture	wagu
arara	macaw	itihĩn
jabuti	Chelonoidis tortoise	ʃanaʃu
peixe	fish	maʃatʃi
jamaru (cabaça)	gourd	kakuhida
mandioca	manioc	kehi / keʃi
beiju	beiju	kai
milho	maize	tʃono
banana	banana	banala
arco	bow	kurapa
canoa	canoe	iʃaa
caxiri	cauim	ʃaraki
machado	axe	ʃipala
pote	bowl	orusu
rede	net	mengü
zarabatana	blowpipe	watahũn
