= Mato River =

Location
- Country: Venezuela

Mato River (Spanish: Río Mato) is a river of Venezuela. It is part of the Orinoco River basin.

== See also ==
- List of rivers of Venezuela
