= Suapure River =

Coordinates: 6.7942°N 67.0247°W

Suapuare River

Location
- Country: Venezuela

Suapuare River is a river of Venezuela. It is part of the Orinoco River basin.

== See also ==
- List of rivers of Venezuela
