= Baria River =

River in Venezuela

Location
- Country: Venezuela

Baria River is a river of Venezuela. It is part of the Amazon River basin.

== See also ==
- List of rivers of Venezuela
