= Guarapiche River =

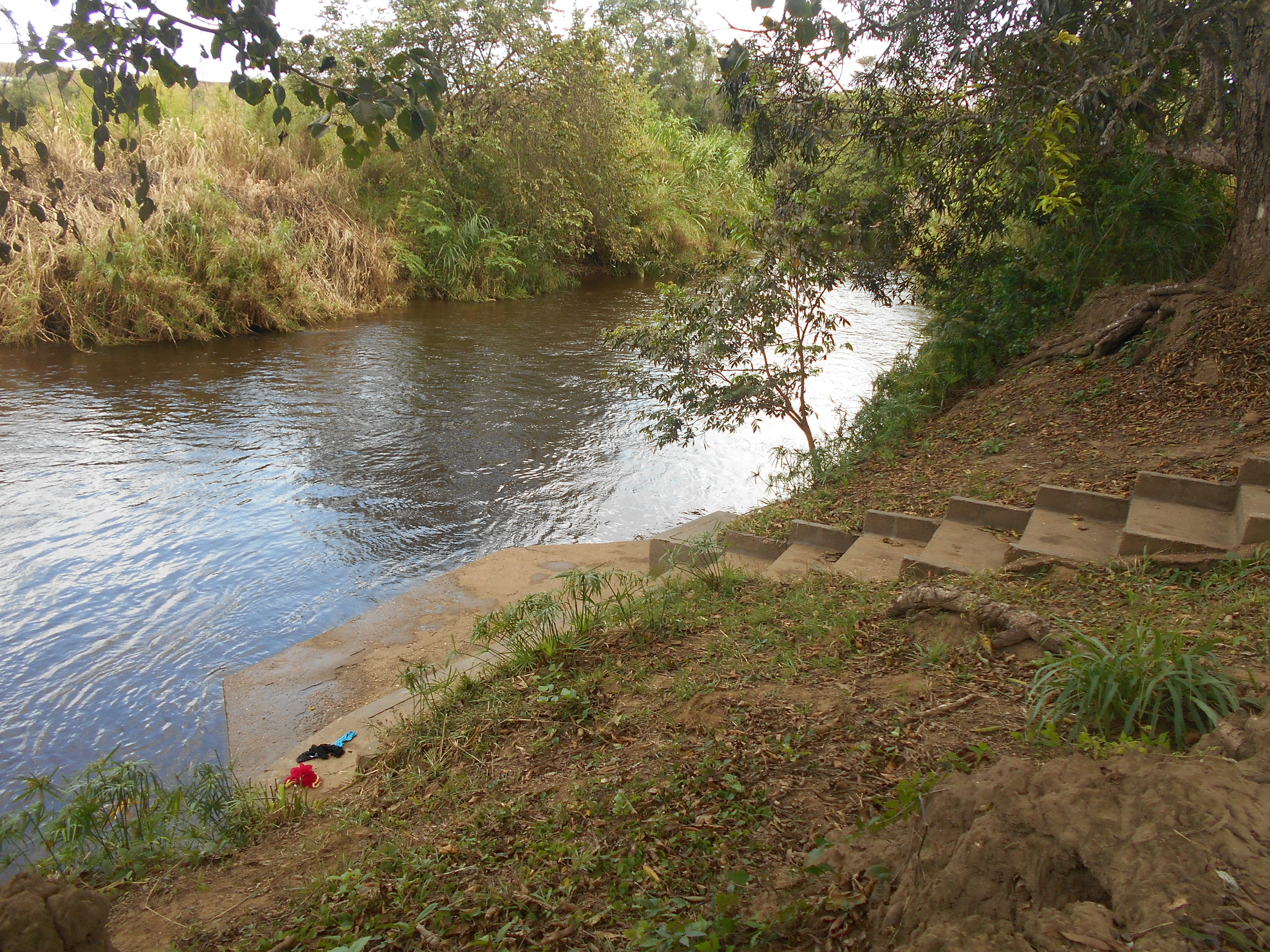

Location
- Country: Venezuela

Physical characteristics
- Source
  - location: Puertas de Miraflores, Turimiquire Range
- Mouth
  - location: Caño Francés

Guarapiche River is a river of north-eastern Venezuela. It flows into the San Juan River.

== Course ==
Its origin is in the canyon named Puertas de Miraflores in the Turimiquire Range. Together with it flows into a short body named Caño Francés whose mouth is in the San Juan River shortly before its mouth in the Gulf of Paria. In February 2012 there was an oil spill in the mangrove area at the mouth of the river.

== See also ==
- List of rivers of Venezuela
