= Acarigua River =

Location
- Country: Venezuela

Acarigua River is a river in Venezuela. It is part of the Orinoco River Delta.

== See also ==
- List of rivers of Venezuela
