= Cunucunuma River =

Coordinates: 3.1675°N 66.0311°W

- Location within Venezuela

Location
- Country: Venezuela

Cunucunuma River is a river of Venezuela. It is part of the Orinoco River basin.

== See also ==
- List of rivers of Venezuela
