= Caño Central =

Coordinates: 10°07′N 67°52′W

Location
- Country: Venezuela

The Caño Central is a river of Venezuela. It drains into Lake Valencia.

== See also ==
- List of rivers of Venezuela
