= Tucuro River =

Location
- Country: Venezuela

The Tucuro River is a river of Venezuela. It drains into Lake Maracaibo.

== See also ==
- List of rivers of Venezuela
