= Capayo River =

Location
- Country: Venezuela

Physical characteristics
- Mouth
  - location: Caribbean Sea

Capayo River is a river of northern Venezuela. It flows into the Caribbean Sea.

== See also ==
- List of rivers of Venezuela
