= Neverí River =

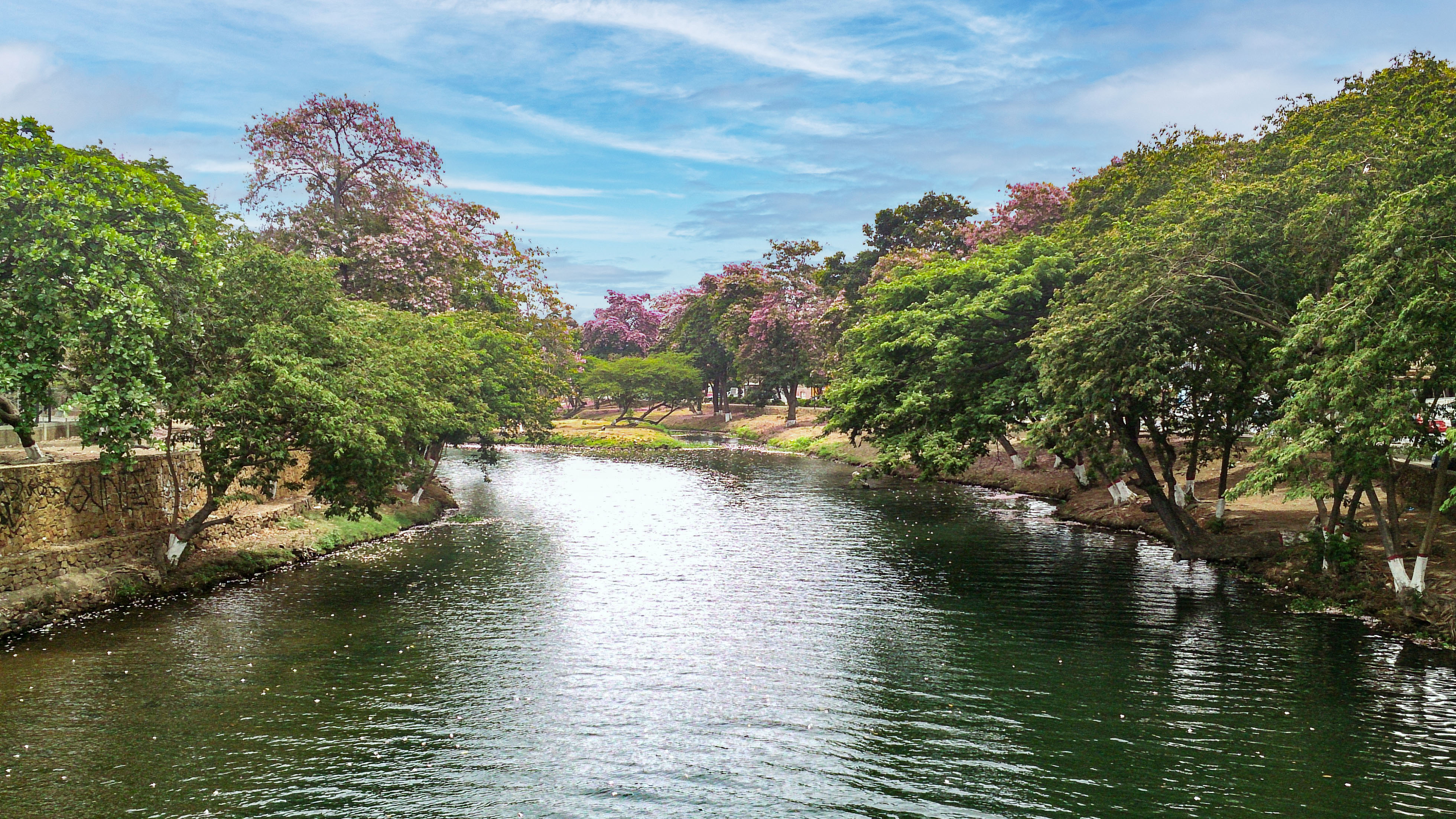

Location
- Country: Venezuela

Physical characteristics
- Mouth: Caribbean Sea
  - coordinates: 10°10′15″N 64°42′29″W

Neverí River (in Spanish, río Neverí) is a river of northern Venezuela, located next to Santa Fe in the state of Sucre. It flows into the Caribbean Sea.

The discharge of industrial and municipal waste, without any treatment, carried by runoff from the Unare and Neverí rivers resulted in the past in chromium concentrations far exceeding the maximum permitted value (47.50 µg·g⁻¹).

In mid-2009, the Venezuelan Ministry of the People’s Power for the Environment began a cleanup of the banks of the Neverí River. The project included the removal of the invasive aquatic plant known as “bora” (Eichhornia crassipes), which was to be cleared from a 1.5-kilometer stretch of the river channel between the Monagas and Iron bridges in the city of Barcelona, as well as the restoration and cleaning of an additional 5 kilometers of the Neverí riverbed.

== See also ==
- List of rivers of Venezuela
