= Cura River =

- The Chorros de Cura river, located in the town of Los Manires, Aragua State, Venezuela.

Location
- Country: Venezuela

The Cura River is a river of Venezuela. It drains into Lake Valencia.

== See also ==
- List of rivers of Venezuela
