= Cuao River =

Coordinates: 4.9639°N 67.7133°W

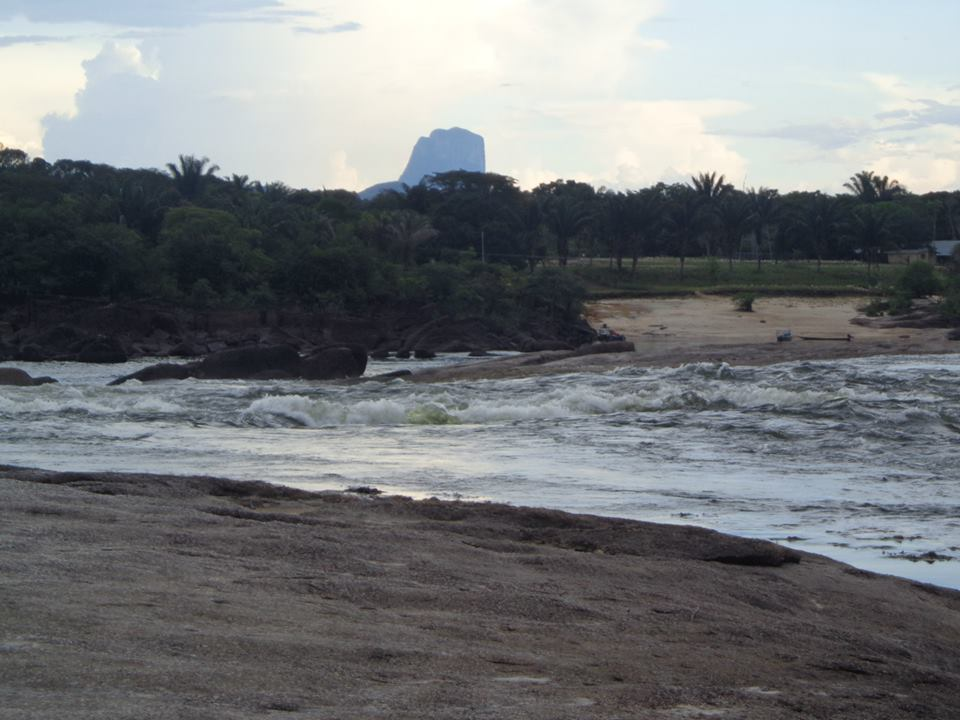

Location
- Country: Venezuela

Cuao River is a river of Venezuela. It is part of the Orinoco River basin.

== See also ==
- List of rivers of Venezuela
