= Aro River =

Coordinates: 7.9825°N 64.1656°W

Location
- Country: Venezuela

Aro River is a river of Venezuela. It is part of the Orinoco River basin.

== See also ==
- List of rivers of Venezuela
