= Mavaca River =

Coordinates: 2.5075°N 65.1567°W

Location
- Country: Venezuela

Mavaca River is a river of Venezuela. It is part of the Orinoco River basin.

== See also ==
- List of rivers of Venezuela
