= Ocamo River =

Coordinates: 2.7828°N 65.2208°W

Location
- Country: Venezuela

Ocamo River is a river of Venezuela. It is part of the Orinoco River basin.

== See also ==
- List of rivers of Venezuela
