= San Juan River (Venezuela) =

- Nautical chart of the Río San Juan, published in 1965

Location
- Country: Venezuela

Physical characteristics
- Mouth
  - location: Gulf of Paria

San Juan River (Río San Juan) is a river in Sucre and Monagas states, north-eastern Venezuela. Its eastern part forms the limit between both states before it flows into the Gulf of Paria. The Guarapiche River flows into a short body named Caño Francés that flows into the San Juan shortly before its mouth in the Gulf of Paria. In February 2012 there was an oil spill in the mangrove area at the mouth of the river.

== See also ==
- List of rivers of Venezuela
