= Supamo River =

River in Venezuela

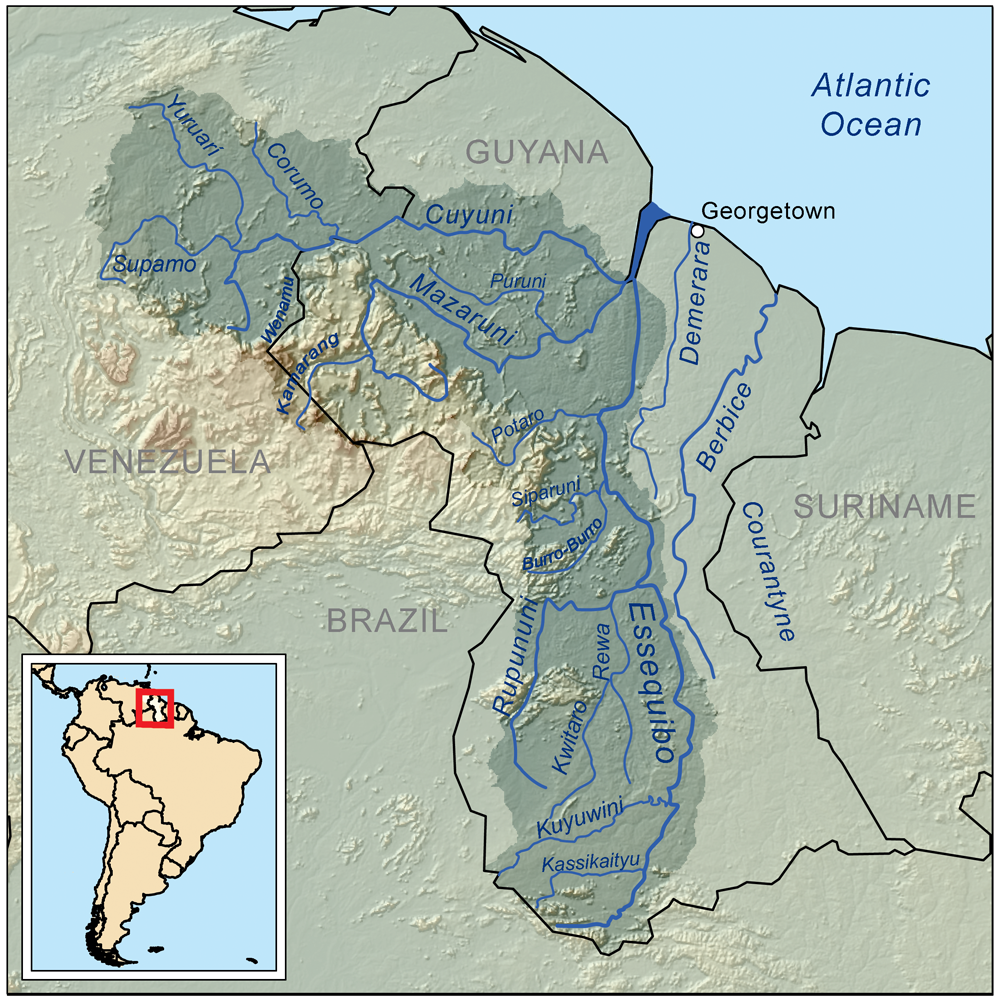
- Map of the Essequibo River Basin. The Supamo River is in the Venezuelan portion.

Location
- Country: Venezuela

Physical characteristics
- Mouth
  - location: Cuyuní

Basin features
- Progression: Cuyuní → Essequibo → Atlantic Ocean
- River system: Essequibo River Basin

Supamo River is a river of Venezuela. It is part of the Essequibo River basin and a tributary of the Cuyuní.

== See also ==
- List of rivers of Venezuela
