= Los Guayos River =

Coordinates: 10°11′20″N 67°56′0″W

Location
- Country: Venezuela

The Los Guayos River is a river of Venezuela. It drains into Lake Valencia.

== See also ==
- List of rivers of Venezuela
