= Sipapo River =

Coordinates: 5.0597°N 67.7956°W

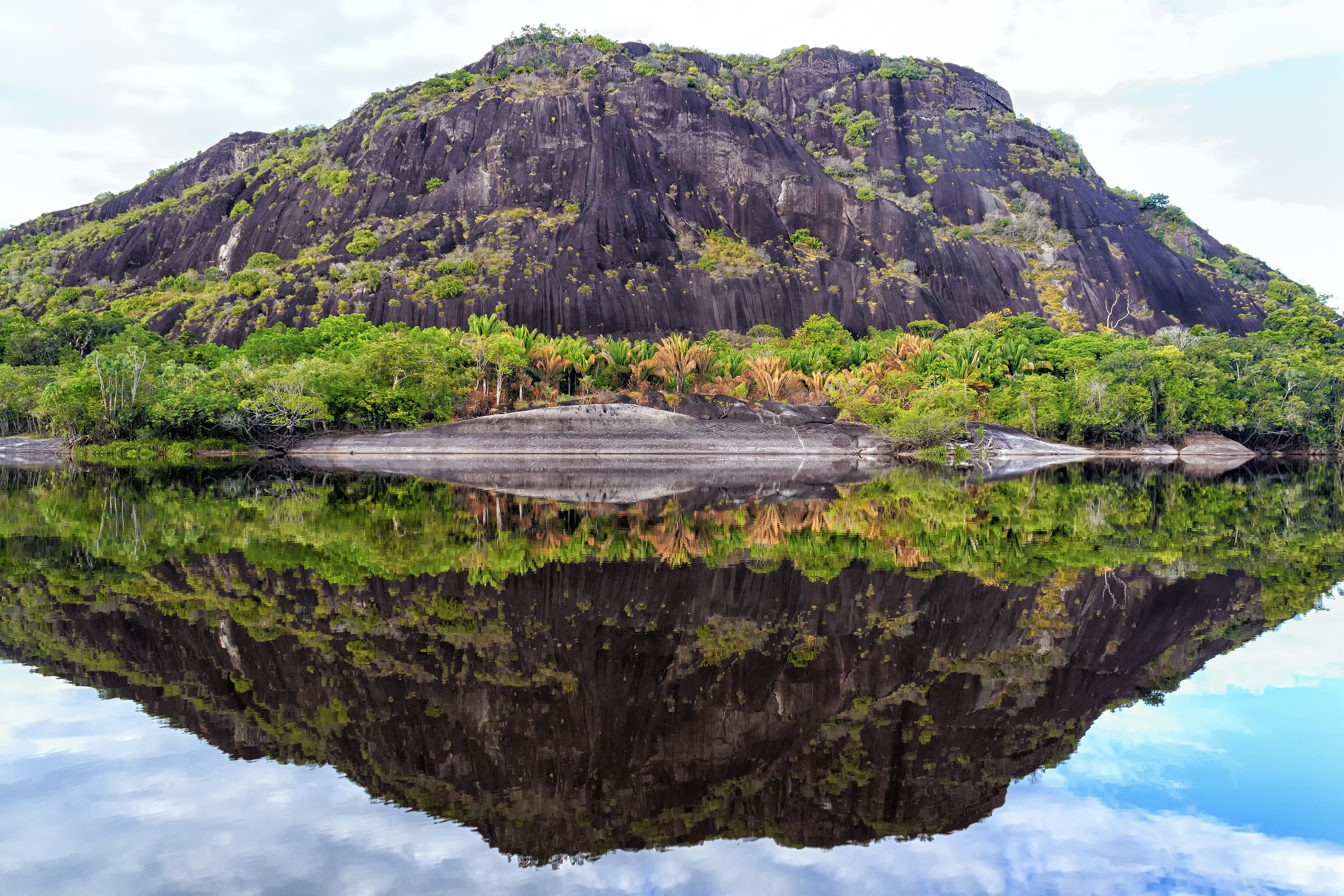

Location
- Country: Venezuela

Sipapo River is a river of Venezuela. It is part of the Orinoco River basin.

== See also ==
- List of rivers of Venezuela
