= Guanipa River =

- Location within Venezuela

Location
- Country: Venezuela

Physical characteristics
- Mouth
  - location: Gulf of Paria
  - coordinates: 10.04383°N 62.44754°W
- Length: 340 km (210 mi)
- Basin size: 1,100 mi^{2} (2,800 km^{2})
- Discharge
  - average: 600 cu ft/s (17 m^{3}/s)

Guanipa River is a river of north-eastern Venezuela. It flows into the Gulf of Paria.

== See also ==
- List of rivers of Venezuela

== Sources ==
- Rand McNally, The New International Atlas, 1993.
