= Orinoco =

River in Venezuela and Colombia

Orinoco River Río Orinoco
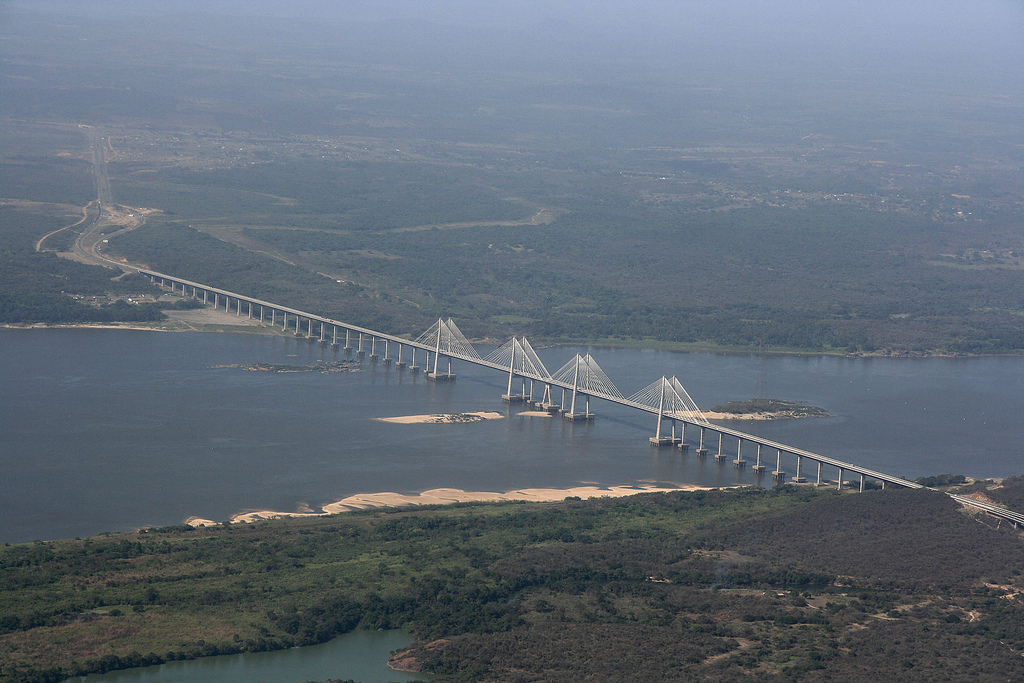
- Orinoquia Bridge near Ciudad Guayana, Venezuela

- The Orinoco drainage basin

- Mouth location in Venezuela
- Etymology: Warao for "a place to paddle"

Location
- Countries: Colombia; Venezuela
- Region: South America

Physical characteristics
- Source: Hydrological source (main stem)
  - location: Cerro Delgado-Chalbaud, Parima Mountains, Venezuela
  - coordinates: 2°19′05″N 63°21′42″W
  - elevation: 1,047 m (3,435 ft)
- 2nd source: Geographical source (Orinoco–Guaviare–Guayabero–Papamene–Sorrento: 3,010 km)
  - location: Cordillera Oriental, Colombia
  - coordinates: 3°31′36.5952″N 74°28′27.3684″W
  - elevation: 3,080 m (10,100 ft)
- Mouth: Delta Amacuro
  - location: Atlantic Ocean, Venezuela
  - coordinates: 8°37′N 62°15′W
  - elevation: 0 m (0 ft)
- Length: 2,140 km (1,330 mi)
- Basin size: 1,014,797 km^{2} (391,815 sq mi)
- Depth
  - maximum: 100 m (330 ft)
- Discharge
  - location: Orinoco Delta
  - average: (Period: 1983–2020) 39,000 m^{3}/s (1,400,000 cu ft/s)
  - minimum: 8,000 m^{3}/s (280,000 cu ft/s)
  - maximum: 85,000 m^{3}/s (3,000,000 cu ft/s)
- Discharge
  - location: Ciudad Guayana
  - average: (Period: 1926–2011) 37,740 m^{3}/s (1,333,000 cu ft/s)
- Discharge
  - location: Ciudad Bolívar
  - average: (Period: 1926–2011) 32,760 m^{3}/s (1,157,000 cu ft/s)
- Discharge
  - location: Puerto Carreño
  - average: (Period: 1971–2000) 18,363.7 m^{3}/s (648,510 cu ft/s)
- Discharge
  - location: Puerto Ayacucho
  - average: (Period: 1926–2011) 16,182 m^{3}/s (571,500 cu ft/s)

Basin features
- Progression: Atlantic Ocean
- River system: Orinoco River
- Tributaries
  - left: Casiquiare, Guaviare, Vichada, Tomo, Cinaruco, Capanaparo, Meta, Arauca, Apure, Guárico
  - right: Mavaca, Sipapo, Ocamo, Ventuari, Suapure, Parguaza, Caura, Cuchivero, Aro, Caroní

The Orinoco (Spanish pronunciation: [oɾiˈnoko]) is one of the longest rivers in South America at 2,140 km (1,330 mi). Its drainage basin, sometimes known as the Orinoquia, covers approximately 1,000,000 km^{2} (390,000 sq mi), with 65% of it in Venezuela and 35% in Colombia. It is the third largest river in the world by discharge volume of water (39,000 m^{3}/s or 1,400,000 cu ft/s at delta) due to the high precipitation throughout its catchment area (2,300 millimetres per are or 0.084 in/sq ft).

The river and its tributaries are the major transportation system for eastern and interior Venezuela and the Llanos plain of Colombia. The Guaviare River is the main tributary. The environment and wildlife in the Orinoco's basin are extremely diverse.

== Etymology ==
The river's name is derived from the Warao term for "a place to paddle", derived from the terms güiri (paddle) and noko (place) i.e. a navigable place.

== History ==
The mouth of the Orinoco River at the Atlantic Ocean was documented by Christopher Columbus on 1 August 1498, during his third voyage. The Orinoco as well as its tributaries in the eastern Llanos, such as the Apure and Meta, were explored in the 16th century by German expeditions under Ambrosius Ehinger and his successors. In 1531, starting at the principal outlet in the delta, the Boca de Navios, Diego de Ordaz sailed up the river to the Meta. Antonio de Berrio sailed down the Casanare to the Meta, and then down the Orinoco and back to Coro. In 1595, after capturing de Berrio to obtain information while conducting an expedition to find the fabled city of El Dorado, the Englishman Sir Walter Raleigh sailed down the river, reaching the savanna country.

From April to May 1800, the Prussian-born Alexander von Humboldt and his companion, Aime Bonpland, explored stretches of the Orinoco, supported by indigenous helpers and guided by his interest to prove that South America's waterways formed an interconnected system from the Andes to the Amazon. He reported on the pink river dolphins and later published extensively on the river's flora and fauna.

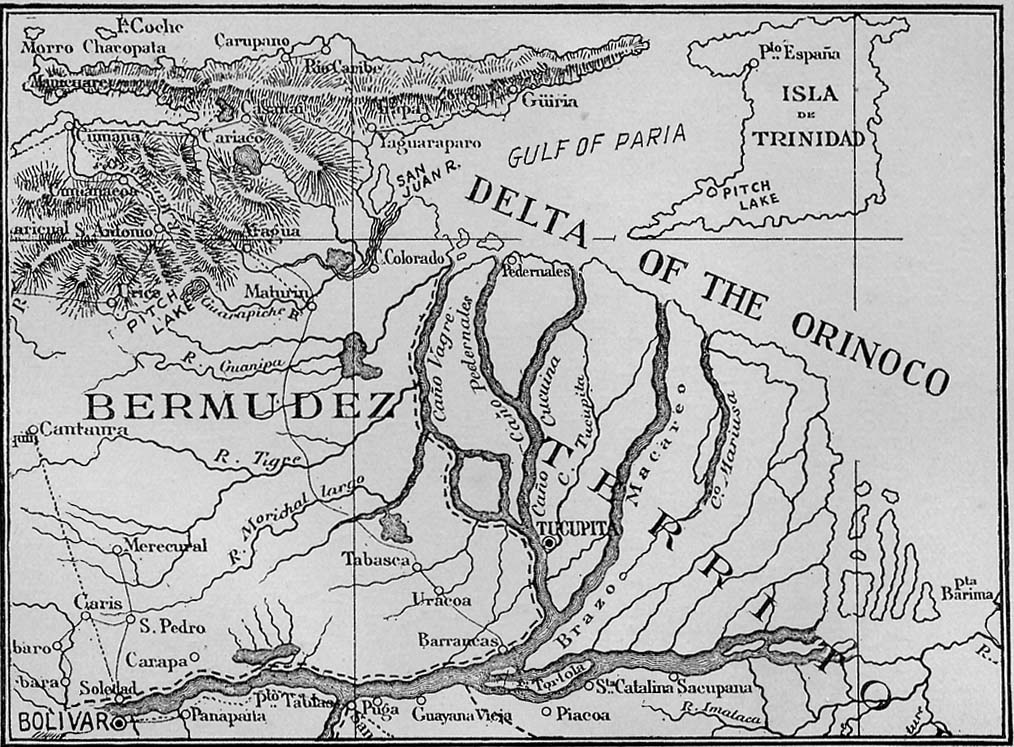
Map of the Lower Orinoco, 1897

The source of the Orinoco River, located at Cerro Delgado–Chalbaud (2º19’05” N, 63º21’42” W), at 1,047 m (3,435 ft) above sea level, was discovered in 1951 by a French-Venezuelan expedition that explored the upper Orinoco course to the Sierra Parima near the border with Brazil, headed by Venezuelan army officer Frank Risquez Iribarren.

In 1968, an expedition from The Geographical Journal set off from Manaus, Brazil aboard a SR.N6 hovercraft to follow the Rio Negro upstream to where it is joined by the Casiquiare canal, on the border between Colombia and Venezuela. After following the Casiquiare to the Orinoco River they hovered through perilous rapids of Maipures and Atures. The Orinoco was then traversed down to its mouths in the Gulf of Paria and then to the Port of Spain. The primary purpose of the expedition was filming for the BBC series The World About Us episode "The Last Great Journey on Earth from Amazon to Orinoco by Hovercraft", which aired in 1970 and demonstrated the abilities of a hovercraft, thereby promoting sales of the British invention.

The first bridge across the Orinoco River, the Angostura Bridge at Ciudad Bolívar, Venezuela, was completed in 1967. The first powerline crossing of the Orinoco River was completed in 1981 for an 800 kV TL single span of 1,200 m (3,900 ft) using two towers 110 m (360 ft) tall. In 1992, an overhead power line crossing for two 400 kV-circuits was completed west of Morocure (between Ciudad Bolívar and Ciudad Guayana). It had three towers, and the two spans measured 2,161 m (7,090 ft) and 2,537 m (8,323 ft), respectively. In 2006, the Orinoquia Bridge was completed near Ciudad Guayana.

== Geography ==
The course forms a wide ellipsoidal arc, surrounding the Guiana Shield; it is divided in four stretches of unequal length that very roughly correspond to the longitudinal zonation of a typical large river:

- Upper Orinoco – 286 km (178 mi) long, from its headwaters to the Raudales de Guaharibos rapids, flows through mountainous landscape in a northwesterly direction
- Middle Orinoco – 805 km (500 mi) long, divided into two sectors, the first of which ca. 515 km (320 mi) long has a general westward direction down to the confluence with the Atabapo and Guaviare rivers at San Fernando de Atabapo; the second flows northward, for about 290 km (180 mi), along the Colombia–Venezuela border, flanked on both sides by the westernmost granitic upwellings of the Guiana Shield which impede the development of a flood plain, to the Atures rapids near the confluence with the Meta River at Puerto Carreño
- Lower Orinoco – 959 km (596 mi) long with a well-developed alluvial plain, flows in a northeast direction, from Atures rapids down to Piacoa at Barrancas
- Delta Amacuro – 200 km (120 mi) long that empties into the Gulf of Paría and the Atlantic Ocean, a very large delta, some 22,500 km^{2} (8,700 sq mi) and 370 km (230 mi) at its widest.

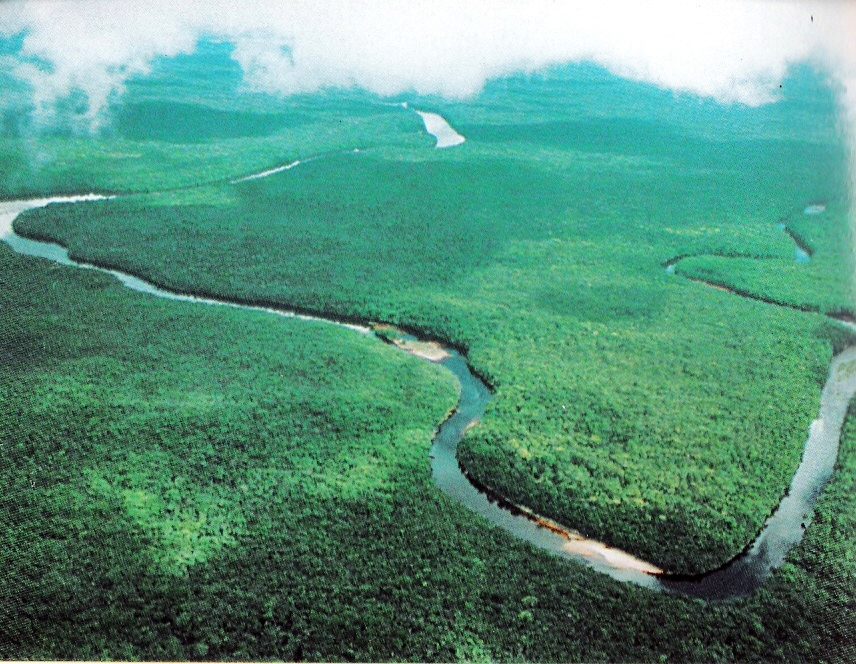
Orinoco in Mariusa National Park (Delta Amacuro)

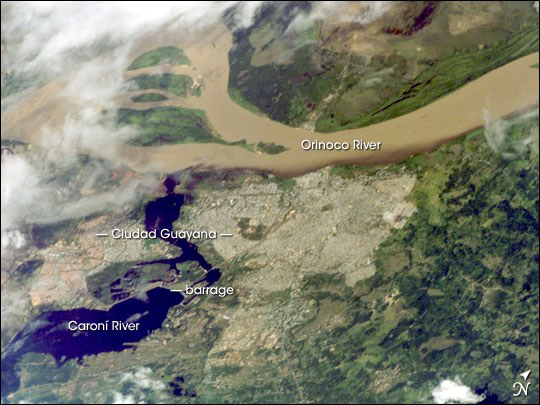
Orinoco at its confluence with the Caroní River (lower left)

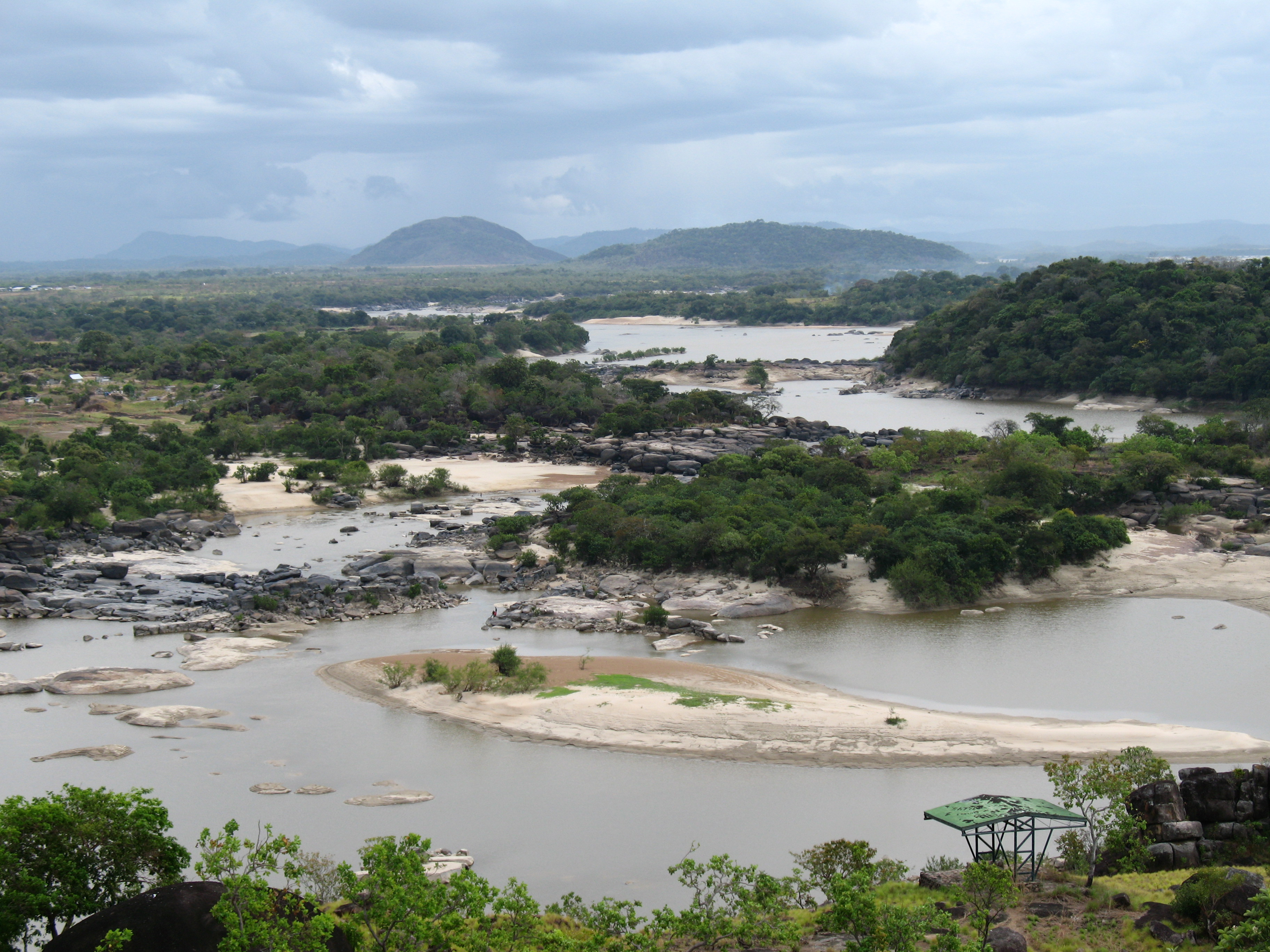
Rapids of the Orinoco, near Puerto Ayacucho airport, Venezuela

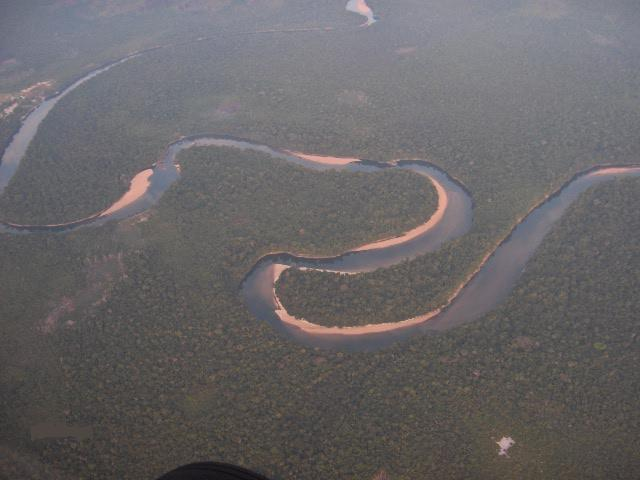
Orinoco in Amazonas State, Venezuela

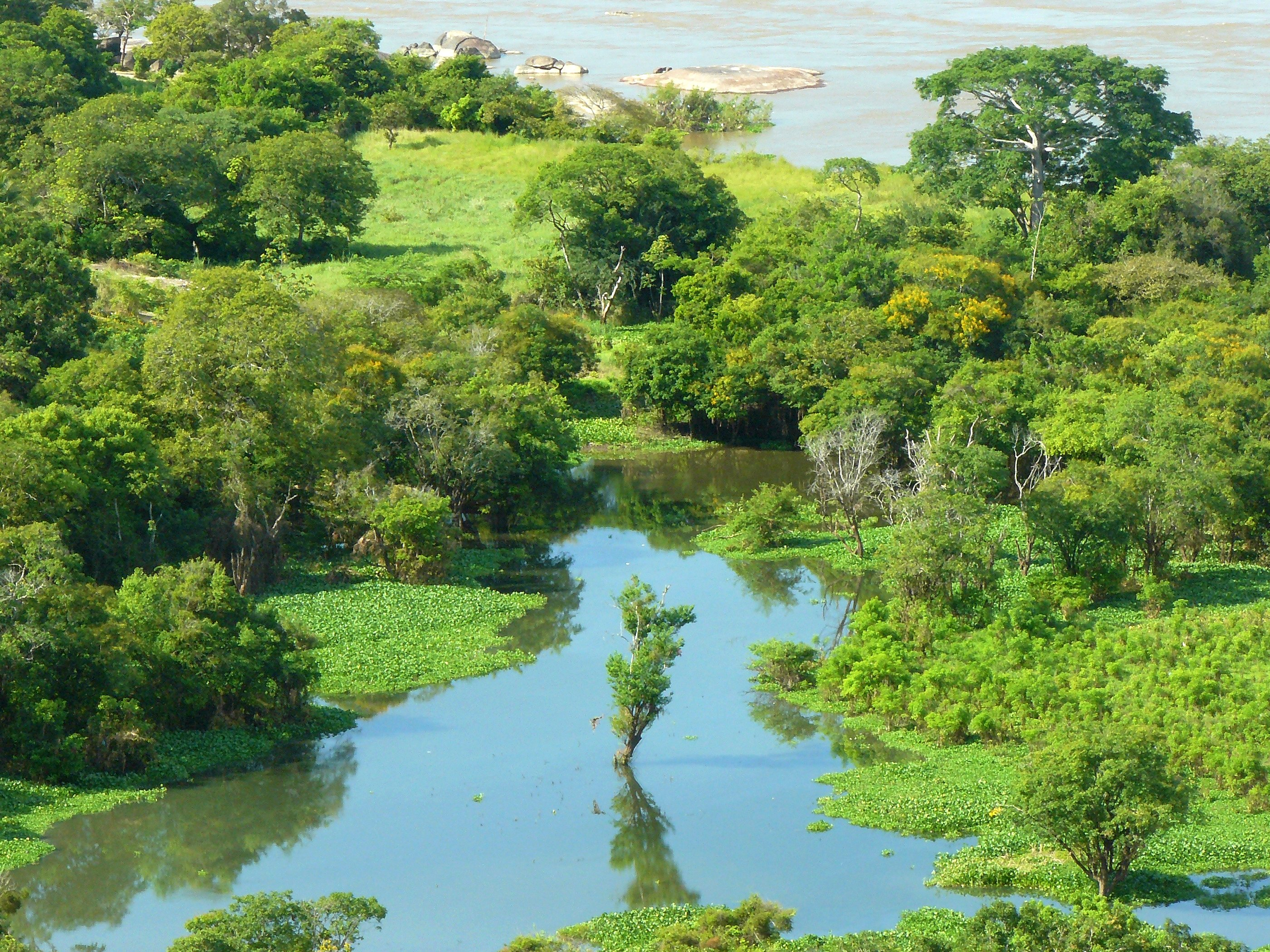
Orinoco in Amazonas State, Venezuela

At its mouth, the Orinoco River forms a wide delta that branches off into hundreds of rivers and waterways that flow through 41,000 km^{2} (16,000 sq mi) of swampy forests. In the rainy season, the Orinoco River can swell to a breadth of 22 km (14 mi) and a depth of 100 m (330 ft). The stream gradient of the entire river is 0.05% (1,047 m [3,435 ft] over 2,250 km [1,400 mi]). Downstream of Raudales de Guaharibos the gradient is 0.01% (183 m [600 ft] over 1,964 km [1,220 mi]), which is also the gradient from Ciudad Bolivar to the ocean (54 m [177 ft] over 435 km [270 mi]).

Encompassing the states of Anzoategui-Guarico and Monagas states, the Interior Range forms the northern boundary and the Guayana Shield the southern boundary. Maturin forms the eastern subbasin and Guarico forms the western subbasin. The El Furrial oil field was discovered in 1978, producing from late Oligocene shallow marine sandstones in an overthrusted foreland basin.

=== Tributaries ===
Most of the important Venezuelan rivers are tributaries of the Orinoco, the largest being the Caroní, which joins it at Puerto Ordaz, close to the Llovizna Falls. The Guaviare River, with a flow of 8,200 cubic meters, is the main tributary.

A peculiarity of the river system is the Casiquiare canal, which starts as an arm of the Orinoco, and finds its way to the Rio Negro, a tributary of the Amazon River, thus forming a distributary and 'natural canal' between the Orinoco and the Amazon.

- Apure
- Arauca
- Atabapo
- Caroní
- Casiquiare canal
- Caura
- Guaviare
- Inírida
- Meta
- Ventuari
- Vichada

== Discharge ==
=== Ciudad Guayana ===
Period: 1995–2024
Year	Average discharge (m^{3}/s)
2024	33,007
2023	36,380
2022	42,663
2021	42,786
2020	31,551
2019	34,620
2018	40,870
2017	39,057
2016	39,841
2015	33,747
2014	36,018
2013	36,484
2012	44,049
2011	40,189
2010	40,101
2009	30,919
2008	38,444
2007	40,936
2006	42,628
2005	37,972
2004	42,409
2003	41,235
2002	40,373
2001	30,510
2000	37,390
1999	39,080
1998	36,844
1997	33,094
1996	38,620
1995	32,853

Monthly average discharge (m^{3}/s, period 1996 to 1998)
Month	1996	1997	1998	1943–1998
January	17,627	24,386	10,919	16,661
February	14,486	17,144	7,583	10,108
March	15,334	15,767	8,906	7,702
April	12,514	12,615	12,411	10,609
May	23,670	25,152	32,751	26,317
June	45,781	43,142	49,062	45,179
July	61,177	55,597	63,659	58,412
August	67,639	61,275	67,756	64,975
September	65,933	53,825	66,416	63,244
October	57,912	38,742	54,189	53,201
November	45,267	28,372	38,345	40,805
December	36,094	21,116	30,130	29,229
Mean	38,620	33,094	36,844	35,537

=== Ciudad Bolívar ===
Minimum and maximum discharge (m^{3}/s, period 2000 to 2023)
Year	Min	Mean	Max	Year	Min	Mean	Max
2000	4,799	33,415	67,667	2012	7,805	38,685	77,909
2001	3,438	25,695	59,527	2013	5,581	32,041	65,850
2002	3,868	34,002	74,367	2014	4,364	31,632	71,214
2003	3,287	34,728	74,367	2015	5,725	29,476	71,136
2004	4,071	35,717	74,208	2016	3,514	35,474	78,398
2005	5,439	31,980	64,800	2017	7,520	34,302	77,315
2006	6,521	35,901	77,422	2018	4,693	36,467	82,611
2007	3,949	34,477	71,527	2019	4,846	32,017	72,203
2008	4,754	32,378	70,536	2020	4,570	28,915	63,638
2009	7,419	26,041	59,671	2021	7,279	39,378	74,873
2010	3,067	35,286	75,807	2022	6,463	39,094	75,912
2011	6,368	37,957	74,367	2023	8,377	32,523	68,742

Monthly average discharge (m^{3}/s, period 2018 to 2023)
Month	2018	2019	2020	2021	2022	2023	1926–2023
January	11,009	8,955	13,667	19,108	11,067	14,528	11,637
February	7,593	6,414	7,142	9,554	6,463	9,412	6,840
March	4,693	4,846	4,570	7,279	10,187	8,377	5,521
April	6,862	5,634	5,080	16,378	13,860	10,036	7,347
May	27,262	17,343	11,688	33,363	28,156	19,290	20,295
June	46,541	36,447	29,204	63,086	50,344	41,963	39,205
July	73,295	57,240	42,542	68,208	68,499	59,398	57,550
August	82,611	72,203	57,742	74,873	75,912	68,742	69,207
September	70,591	69,859	63,638	68,441	73,589	67,129	66,502
October	50,838	48,298	50,060	53,294	54,020	52,622	51,206
November	34,852	34,644	36,926	36,518	45,509	23,332	35,752
December	21,457	22,317	24,718	22,437	31,527	15,450	22,974
Mean	36,467	32,017	28,915	39,378	39,094	32,523	32,836

Average discharge (m^{3}/s, complete series from 1926 to 2023)
Year	m^{3}/s	Year	m^{3}/s	Year	m^{3}/s
1926	23,376	1959	30,333	1992	28,571
1927	37,476	1960	31,818	1993	35,204
1928	32,838	1961	27,830	1994	35,110
1929	32,653	1962	32,930	1995	29,360
1930	30,610	1963	32,560	1996	35,992
1931	33,766	1964	27,736	1997	28,757
1932	33,302	1965	27,643	1998	35,000
1933	32,792	1966	29,220	1999	34,925
1934	34,137	1967	34,323	2000	33,415
1935	31,168	1968	32,280	2001	25,695
1936	31,260	1969	32,606	2002	34,002
1937	29,962	1970	34,600	2003	34,728
1938	37,383	1971	33,673	2004	35,717
1939	28,292	1972	36,177	2005	31,980
1940	25,232	1973	27,597	2006	35,901
1941	28,200	1974	26,344	2007	34,477
1942	31,540	1975	29,313	2008	32,378
1943	38,403	1976	37,290	2009	26,041
1944	34,878	1977	30,705	2010	35,286
1945	33,395	1978	32,514	2011	37,957
1946	36,363	1979	32,885	2012	38,685
1947	30,426	1980	35,018	2013	32,041
1948	31,818	1981	38,080	2014	31,632
1949	32,745	1982	36,224	2015	29,476
1950	32,096	1983	36,130	2016	35,474
1951	38,220	1984	31,493	2017	34,302
1952	33,858	1985	30,380	2018	36,467
1953	36,177	1986	35,040	2019	32,017
1954	38,310	1987	34,090	2020	28,915
1955	31,076	1988	30,472	2021	39,378
1956	36,734	1989	29,638	2022	39,094
1957	29,128	1990	33,442	2023	32,523
1958	28,108	1991	31,770	2024	

== Ecology ==
The environment and wildlife in the Orinoco's basin are extremely diverse. The boto and the giant otter inhabit the river system. The Orinoco crocodile is one of the rarest reptiles in the world; its range in the wild is restricted to the middle and lower Orinoco River basin.

More than 1,000 fish species have been recorded in the river basin, and about 15% are endemic. By far the largest orders are Characiformes and Siluriformes, which together account for more than 80% of the fresh water species. Some of the more famous are the black spot piranha and the cardinal tetra. Because the Casiquiare canal includes both blackwater and clear- to whitewater sections, only relatively adaptable species are able to pass through it between the two river systems, such as the cardinal tetra.

== Economic activity ==
The river is navigable for most of its length, and dredging enables ocean ships to go as far as Ciudad Bolívar, at the confluence of the Caroní River, 435 km (270 mi) upstream. River steamers carry cargo as far as Puerto Ayacucho and the Atures Rapids.

In 1926, a Venezuelan mining inspector found one of the richest iron ore deposits near the Orinoco delta, south of the city of San Felix on a mountain named El Florero. Full-scale mining of the ore deposits began after World War II, by a conglomerate of Venezuelan firms and US steel companies. In the early 1950s, about 10,000 tons of ore-bearing soil was mined per day.

The river deposits contain extensive tar sands in the Orinoco oil belt, which may be a source of future oil production.

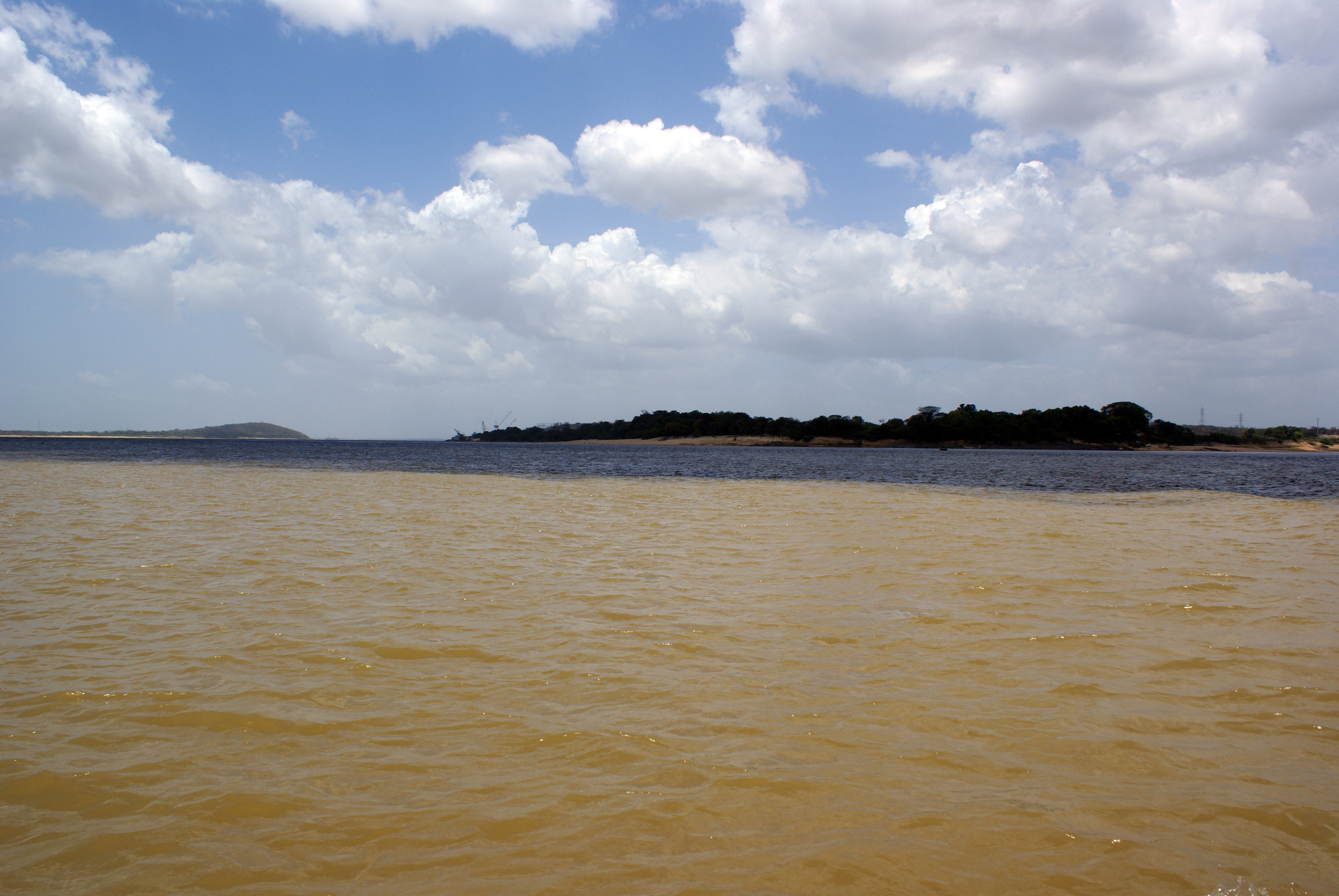
Union of the Orinoco with the Caroní River

== Recreation and sports ==
Since 1973, the Civil Association Nuestros Rios son Navegables organize the Internacional Rally Nuestros Rios son Navegables, a motonautical round trip of over 1,200 kilometers through the Orinoco, Meta and Apure Rivers. Starting out from Ciudad Bolívar or San Fernando de Apure, is the longest fluvial rally in the world with the participation of worldwide competitors, more than 30 support boats, logistics teams, thousands of tourists and fans travel. The boats had an average speed of 120 miles per hour.

Since 1988, the local government of Ciudad Guayana has conducted a swim race in the Orinoco and Caroní, with up to 1,000 competitors. Since 1991, the Paso a Nado Internacional de los Rios Orinoco–Caroní has been celebrated every year in April. Worldwide, this swim meet has grown in importance, and it has a large number of competitors.

== In culture ==
The Irish singer and songwriter Enya wrote and sang the song "Orinoco Flow", which she released in 1988 to popular acclaim in Europe and North America. Jules Verne's novel "Superbe Orénoque" has the river as its central theme.

== See also ==
- Adaheli, the Sun in the mythology of the Orinoco region
