= Jesús Enrique Lossada Municipality =

Jesús Enrique Lossada
- Municipality
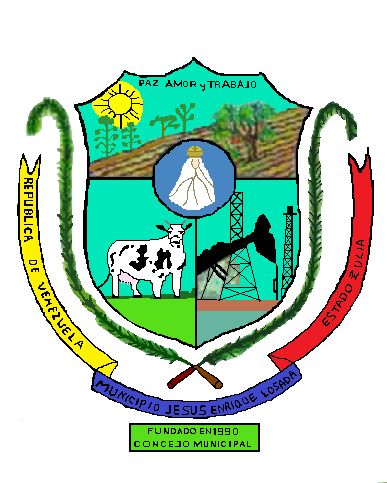
- Flag Coat of arms

- Location of Jesús Enrique Lossada in Zulia and Venezuela
- Coordinates: 10.6°N 72.3°W
- Country: Venezuela
- State: Zulia
- Created: 21 June 1989
- Capital: La Concepción

Government
  - Mayor: Carlos Colina Espeleta (PSUV)

Area
  - Total: 3,533 km^{2} (1,364 sq mi)

Population (2011)
  - Total: 118,756
  - Density: 33.61/km^{2} (87.06/sq mi)
- Time zone: UTC−4 (VET)
- Website: Official website

Jesús Enrique Lossada is a municipality in the metropolitan area of Maracaibo, Venezuela's second largest city. Jesús Enrique Lossada covers an area of 3,533 square kilometres (1,364 sq mi) and recorded a population of 118,756 in the 2011 Venezuelan census. It is named after Jesús Enrique Lossada (1892–1948), a distinguished lawyer, politician, professor, and writer from Maracaibo.

== Geography ==
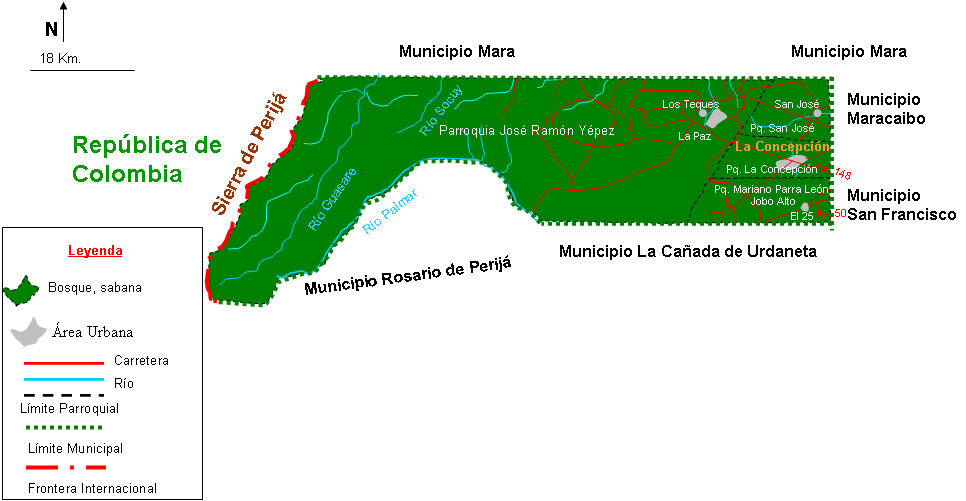
Map of the parroquias and major features in the municipality of Jesús Enrique Lossada.

Jesús Enrique Lossada lies northwest of Lake Maracaibo in the Maracaibo Basin. The municipality borders the municipalities of Mara to the north, Maracaibo and San Francisco to the east, La Cañada de Urdaneta to the southeast, and Rosario de Perijá to the southwest. To the west it borders the Colombian departments of Cesar and La Guajira.

The relief in the eastern part of the municipality is flat, while in the west it elevates to form the mountains of the Serranía del Perijá on the Colombia–Venezuela border. The western highlands are forested, while the eastern lowlands have been largely converted to agricultural land. The Guasare and Socuy rivers originate in the western highlands and flow northeastward into Mara Municipality, where they meet to form the Limón River. The Palmar River, on which the Tres Ríos Reservoir is located, forms the municipal border between Jesús Enrique Lossada and Rosario de Perijá.

The wet season in Jesús Enrique Lossada lasts from May to November. Rainfall increases from north to south and from east to west in the municipality, varying from 500 to 1,500 millimetres (20 to 59 in) annually. The average annual temperature is 26 °C (79 °F).

== History ==
Ranches were first established in the late eighteenth century in what is now the territory of Jesús Enrique Lossada. Shell struck oil at La Paz in 1922 and La Concepción in 1924, and operated the oilfields there until the 1960s. Jesús Enrique Lossada was part of the former Maracaibo District until 21 June 1989, when it and Maracaibo were separated, each becoming independent municipalities.

== Government ==
The following people have served as mayor (alcalde) of Jesús Enrique Lossada:

- Pedro Aldana, 1989–1995
- Mario Urdaneta, 1995–2008, 2013–2017
- Rosiris Orozco, 2008–2013
- Júnior Mujica, 2017–2021

=== Subdivisions ===
Jesús Enrique Lossada is divided into four parroquias, of which La Concepción serves as the capital of the municipality.

Parroquia	Population (2011 census)	Seat
La Concepción	69,284	La Concepción
José Ramón Yepes	25,372	La Paz
Mariano Parra León	9,522	Jobo Alto
San José	14,578	San José

== Economy ==
Jesús Enrique Lossada's economy is primarily based on agriculture. Major crops include corn, cassava, tomatoes, bananas, and other fruits. In particular it is one of the largest producers of grapes in Zulia. Livestock produced in the municipality include cattle, pigs, sheep, goats, and poultry.

== Infrastructure ==
Local roads connect Jesús Enrique Lossada with its neighbouring municipalities. Troncal 6 highway passes through the southeastern corner of the municipality as it runs between Villa del Rosario in the southwest and San Francisco in the east.

The Tres Ríos Reservoir is located at the confluence of the Palmar, Lajas and Caño Pescado rivers on the border between Jesús Enrique Lossada and Rosario de Perijá. Built in 2006, the dam has a capacity of 180 million cubic metres (6.4×10^{9} cu ft) and an effective height of 59 metres (194 ft). It supplies water for irrigation and household consumption. Jesús Enrique Lossada does not have an extensive water distribution system and water is delivered by truck to a majority of households. There is no sewer system in the municipality.

The two hospitals in the municipality are both located in La Concepción.
