= Guajira Municipality, Zulia =

Municipality in Zulia, Venezuela

Guajira Municipality Municipio Guajira Mmakalü Wajiira (Wayuu)
- Municipality
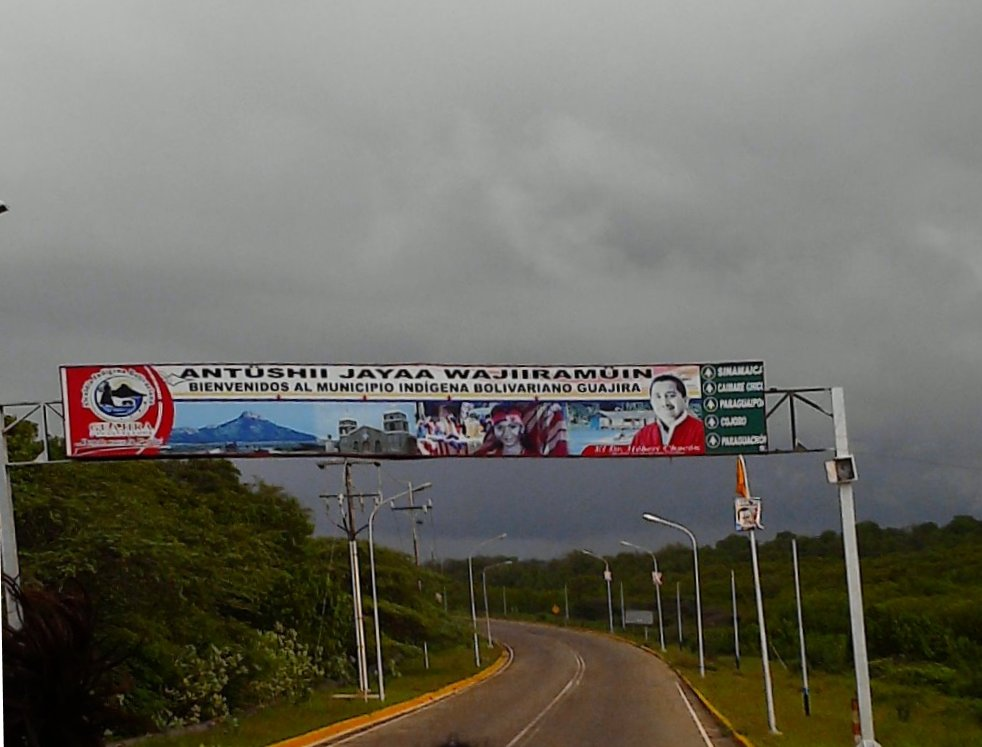

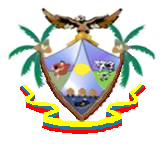
- Flag Seal

- Location in Zulia

- Location in Venezuela
- Country: Venezuela
- State: Zulia
- Founded: 1989
- Municipal seat: Sinamaica

Government
  - Mayor: María Beltrán Castillo (PSUV)

Area
  - Total: 2,190.8 km^{2} (845.9 sq mi)

Population (2023)
  - Total: 88,020
  - Density: 40.18/km^{2} (104.1/sq mi)
- Time zone: UTC−4 (VET)

The Guajira Municipality (Wayuu: Mmakat Wajiira is located in Zulia, Venezuela. It was founded in 1989. The municipality has a total surface of 2370 km^{2} and it has some 88,020 inhabitant (2023 census). Its capital is Sinamaica.
