= Zulia =

- State
- Zulia State; Estado Zulia (Spanish)
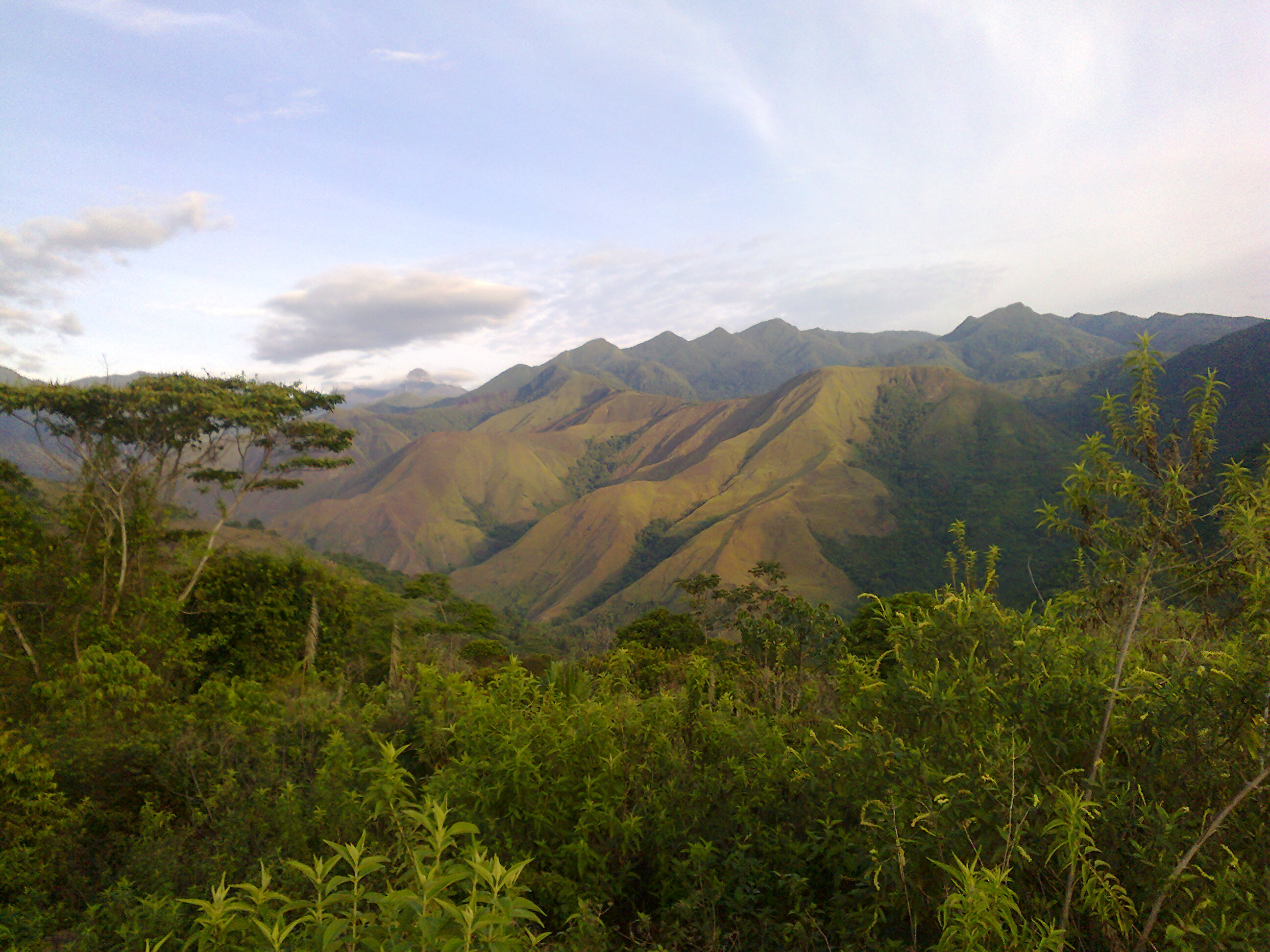
- Mountains in Machiques de Perijá

- Flag Coat of arms
- Anthem: Sobre Palmas
- Location within Venezuela
- Coordinates: 9.84°N 72.25°W
- Country: Venezuela
- Created: 1864
- Capital: Maracaibo

Government
  - Body: Legislative Council
  - Governor: Luis Caldera (2025–2029)

Area
  - Total: 50,230 km^{2} (19,390 sq mi)
  - Rank: 5th
- 6.92% of Venezuela

Population (2017 estimate)
  - Total: 5,125,579
  - Rank: 1st
  - Density: 102.0/km^{2} (264.3/sq mi)
- 18.29% of Venezuela
- Demonym: zuliano
- Time zone: UTC−4 (VET)
- ISO 3166 code: VE-V
- Emblematic tree: Coconut (Cocos nucifera)
- 0.697 medium · 13th of 24: HDI (2019)
- Website: web.archive.org/web/20080612071201/http://www.gobernaciondelzulia.gov.ve:80/

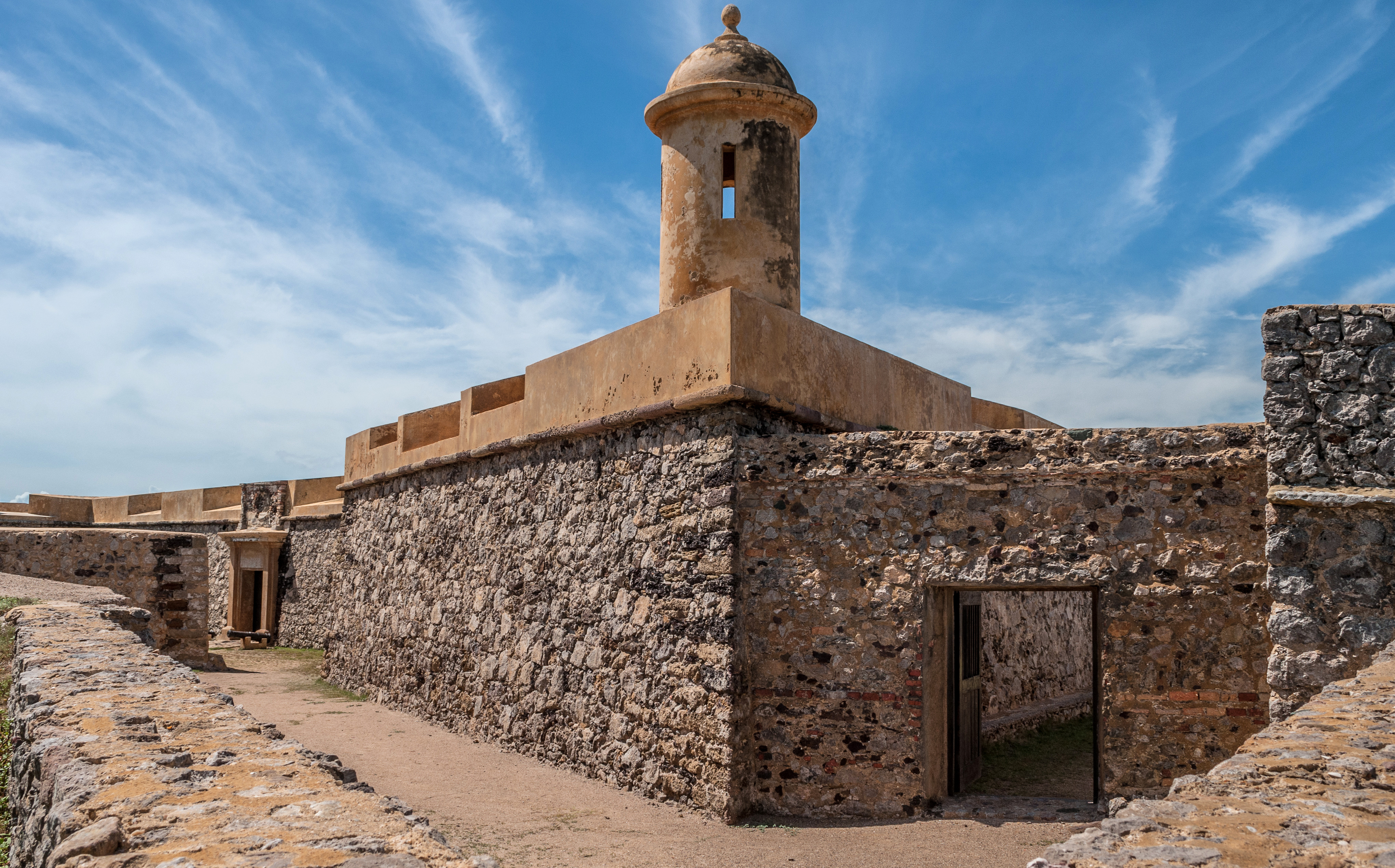
San Carlos de la Barra Castle was built in the 17th century by the Spanish to protect Maracaibo from pirate attacks

Zulia State (Spanish: Estado Zulia, IPA: [esˈtaðo ˈsulja]) is one of the 23 states of Venezuela. The state capital is Maracaibo. As of the 2011 census, it had a population of 3,704,404, making it the most populous state in the country. Zulia is also notable for being one of the few states in Venezuela where voseo—the use of vos as the second-person singular pronoun—is widespread. The state is coterminous with the eponymous region of Zulia.

Zulia is located in northwestern Venezuela, bordering Lake Maracaibo, the largest body of its kind in Latin America. The lake's basin holds some of the largest oil and gas reserves in the Western Hemisphere.

Zulia is economically significant due to its oil and mineral exploitation, but it is also one of Venezuela's major agricultural regions. The state contributes notably in livestock, bananas, fruits, meat, and milk.

== Toponymy ==
There are several competing theories about the origin of the state's name. One holds that Guaimaral, son of the cacique Mara, was on pilgrimage in the Pamplona region, where he fell in love with a woman named Zulia. She was killed in a battle against the Spanish conquerors. Gaimaral returned in sorrow to his father's territory and named rivers, towns and regions in her memory. While there is little historical evidence to support the story, it remains the most widespread version.

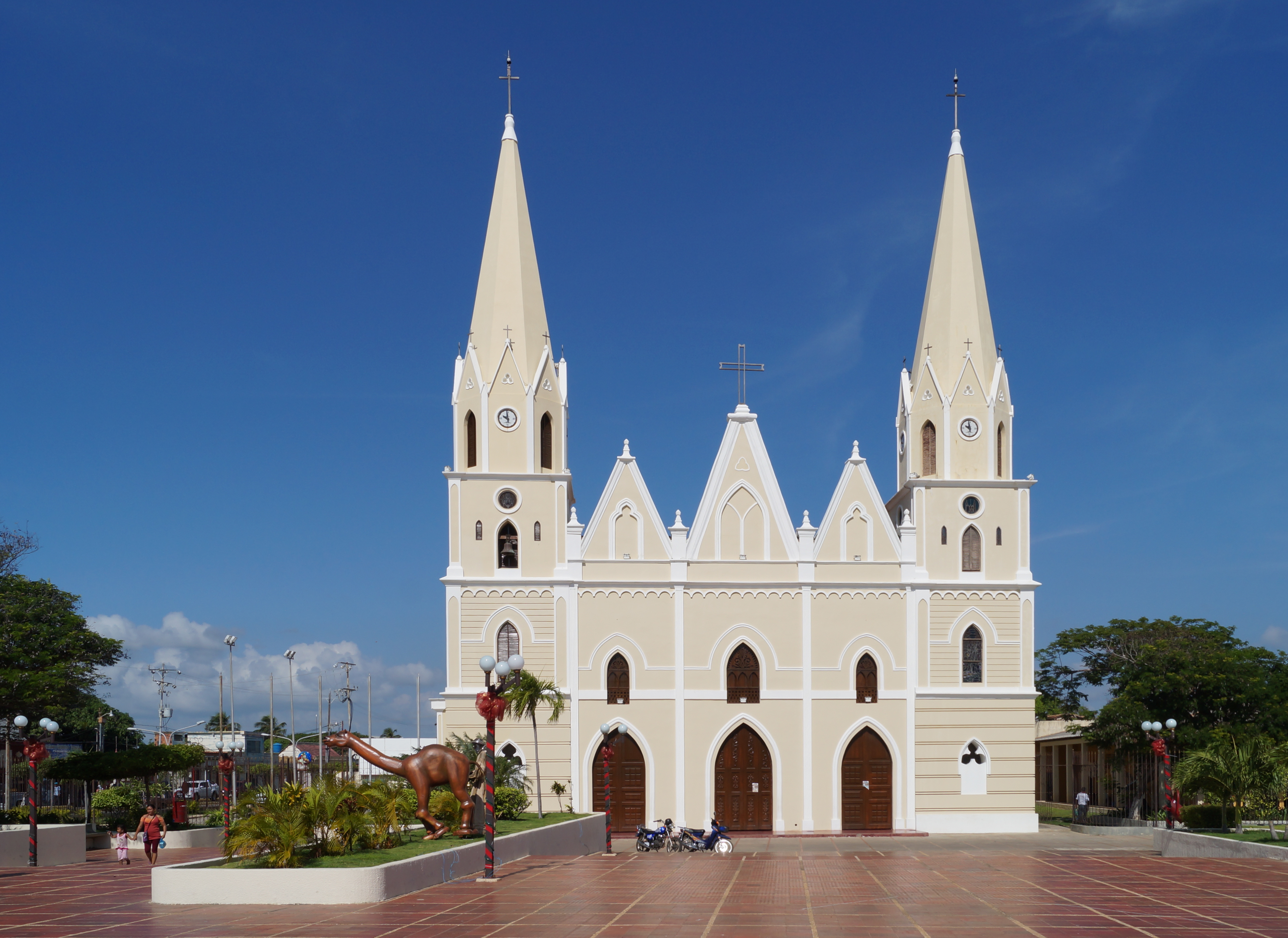
San Rafael Arcangel Church, established in 1843, in San Rafael de El Moján, Zulia

In Wayuu, the state is called Mma’ipakat Suuria, or Suuria for short.

== History ==
=== Before Colonization ===
Indigenous peoples have lived in the region for a long time, including the Yukpa, Barí, Arawakos (Western), Timotes and Cuica, Caquetío, Wayúu, and Añú peoples.

=== Spanish Colonization ===
The area now known as Zulia was first seen by Europeans in 1499 during an expedition led by Alonso de Ojeda. In 1527, the Spanish Crown transferred the governorship and lands of the Venezuela Province to the Welser banking family of Augsburg, Germany. Ambrosio Dalfinger, a representative of the Welsers, became the first governor and conqueror of the region.

Dalfinger led expeditions from Coro to Maracaibo between 1528 and 1529, and later along the eastern shore of Lake Maracaibo to the mouth of the Motatán River. These were the first sustained contacts between Europeans and the Indigenous peoples of the lake region after its initial discovery. These daring ventures, which required considerable courage and effort, inspired the chronicler Juan de Castellanos, who included them in his epic poem Elegies of Illustrious Men of the Indies, completed around 1590.

During the Spanish colonial period, the territory was part of the Venezuela Province until 1676, when it was merged into the Province of Mérida del Espiritu Santo de la Grita, forming the Maracaibo Province (Espiritu Santo de Maracaibo).

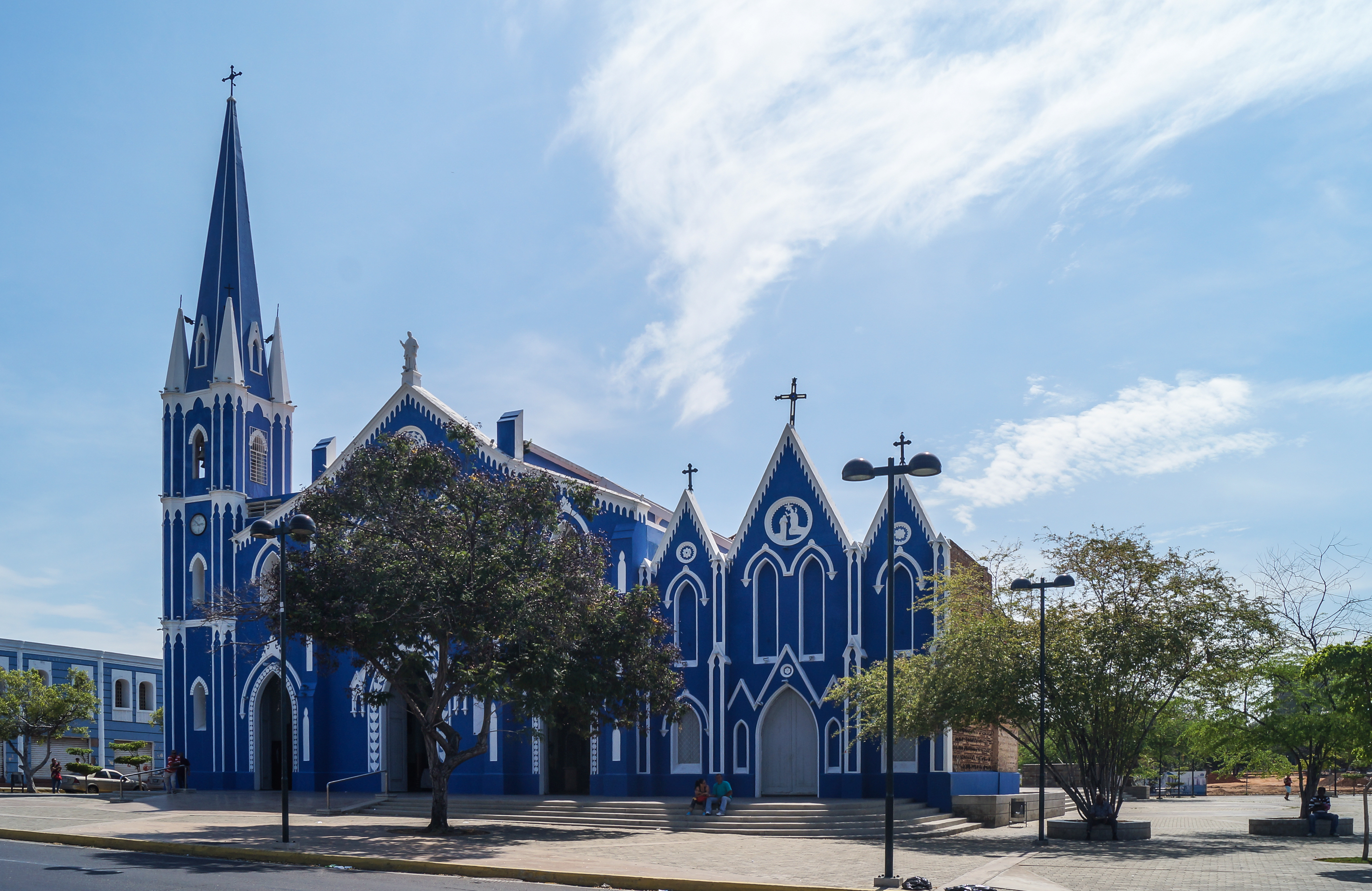
Santa Barbara Church was completed in 1888

The territory that now forms the State of Zulia was established as the Province of Maracaibo in 1678 and, along with Mérida, became part of the Viceroyalty of the New Kingdom of Granada. The region was governed by the President of Royal Audiencia, whose official seat was in Santa Fé de Bogotá. Its jurisdiction extended — often in an inconsistent and impractical manner — over the provinces of Guayana, Cumaná, Maracaibo, and the islands of Margarita and Trinidad.

The administrative challenges posed by this scattered and diverse territory led the Court of Madrid to reorganize the structure. By Royal Decree on September 8, 1777, the Provinces of Maracaibo, Cumaná, Guayana and the Islands of Margarita and Trinidad were incorporated into the newly established Captaincy General of Venezuela (Caracas).

By Royal Decree on February 15, 1785, the city of Barinas and its dependencies, which had belonged to the Province of Maracaibo, were separated to form a new province. In exchange, the city of Trujillo, previously part of the Province of Caracas, was incorporated into the Province of Maracaibo. By 1789, the province encompassed the territory of the present-day Venezuelan states of Zulia, Apure, Barinas, Táchira, Mérida, and Trujillo.

In 1810, Mérida and Trujillo were separated as new provinces. At the beginning of the 19th century, the Province of Maracaibo included, in addition to its capital, the cities of Mérida, Trujillo, San Cristóbal, El Rosario de Perijá, and San Bartolomé de Sinamaica, along with their respective dependencies. After Mérida declared its independence, it was formally separated as its own province, while Maracaibo remained under Spanish control until January 18, 1821, when it joined Gran Colombia, proclaiming its independence from the Government of Madrid.

=== Republican period ===
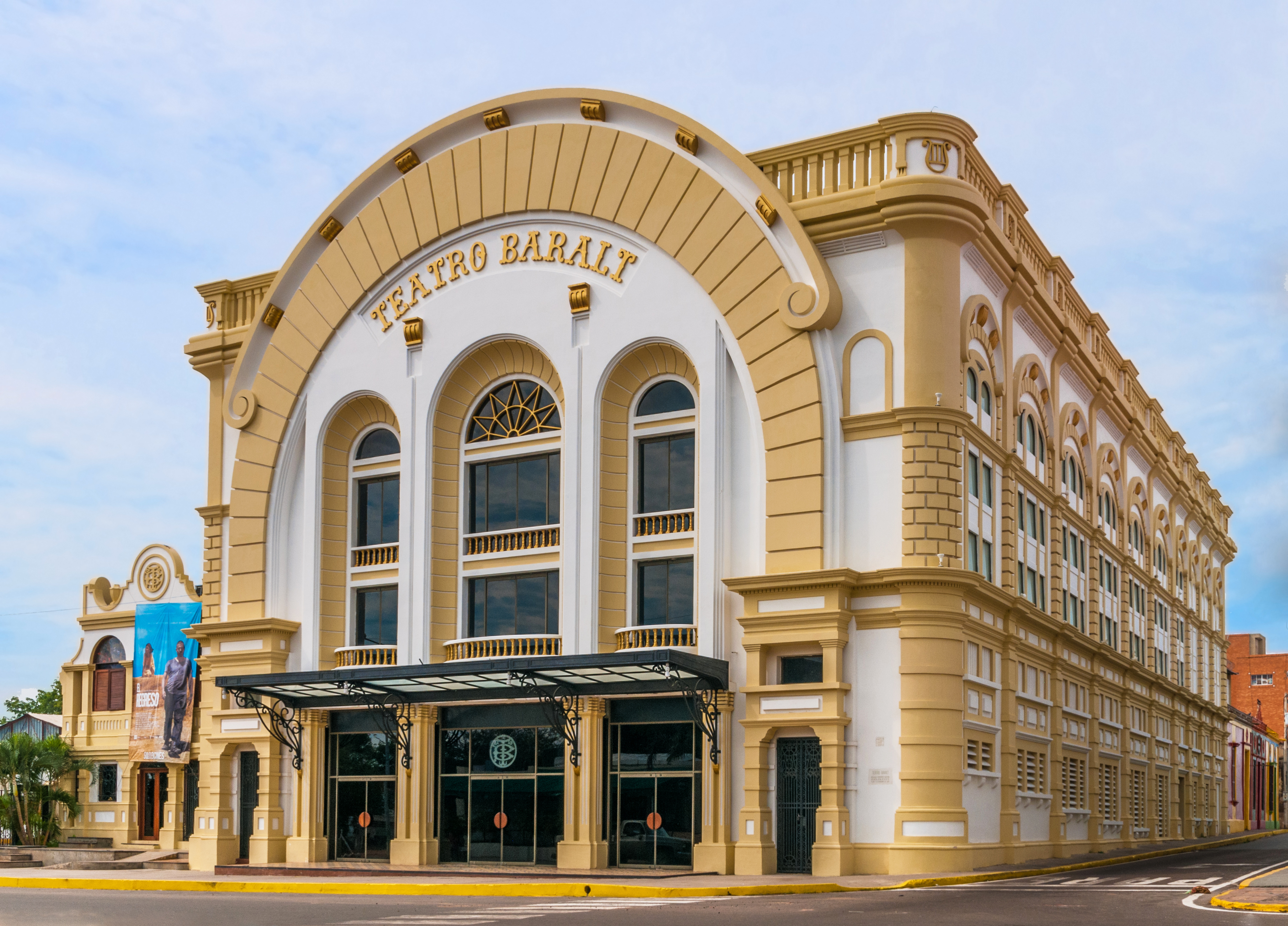
The Baralt Theatre was opened in 1883

The Zulia Province declared independence from Spain on January 28, 1821. During the Gran Colombia period, in 1824, it was renamed the "Zulia Department" in honor of the Zulia River. The Constituent Congress of 1824 divided the territory of Colombia into four departments, one of which was Zulia, composed of the provinces of Coro, Mérida, and Maracaibo.

When Gran Colombia was dissolved in 1830, Maracaibo became a province composed of its own territory and that of Trujillo. One year later, the Trujillo Section was elevated to the status of a separate province, definitively separating from Maracaibo. With the dissolution of Gran Colombia in 1830, the region was officially named Maracaibo Province and became one of the 11 original provinces of Venezuela.

In 1835, the territory of Maracaibo Province was divided into five cantons: Maracaibo, Perijá, Zulia, Gibraltar, and Altagracia. By decree on April 9, 1850, the parishes of La Ceiba and La Ceibita, previously belonging to Maracaibo, were transferred to the Province of Trujillo, giving the Andean province access to Lake Maracaibo.

The Venezuelan federal constitution of April 22, 1864, changed the designation of "province" to "state", creating the "State of Maracaibo" on the same territory previously held by the province. At the end of that same year, the state's legislature decided to rename it the "Sovereign State of Zulia", although this name lasted only a few months.

In 1874, the name was officially changed again to "Zulia State". By federal government order in 1881, the state was merged with Falcón to form the combined Falcón-Zulia State. Its autonomous status was restored on April 1, 1890, when Congress passed legislation separating it from Falcón. The state underwent further territorial changes toward the end of the 19th century, until its current delimitation was finalized in 1899. Since then, it has been officially known as "Estado Zulia".

== Geography ==
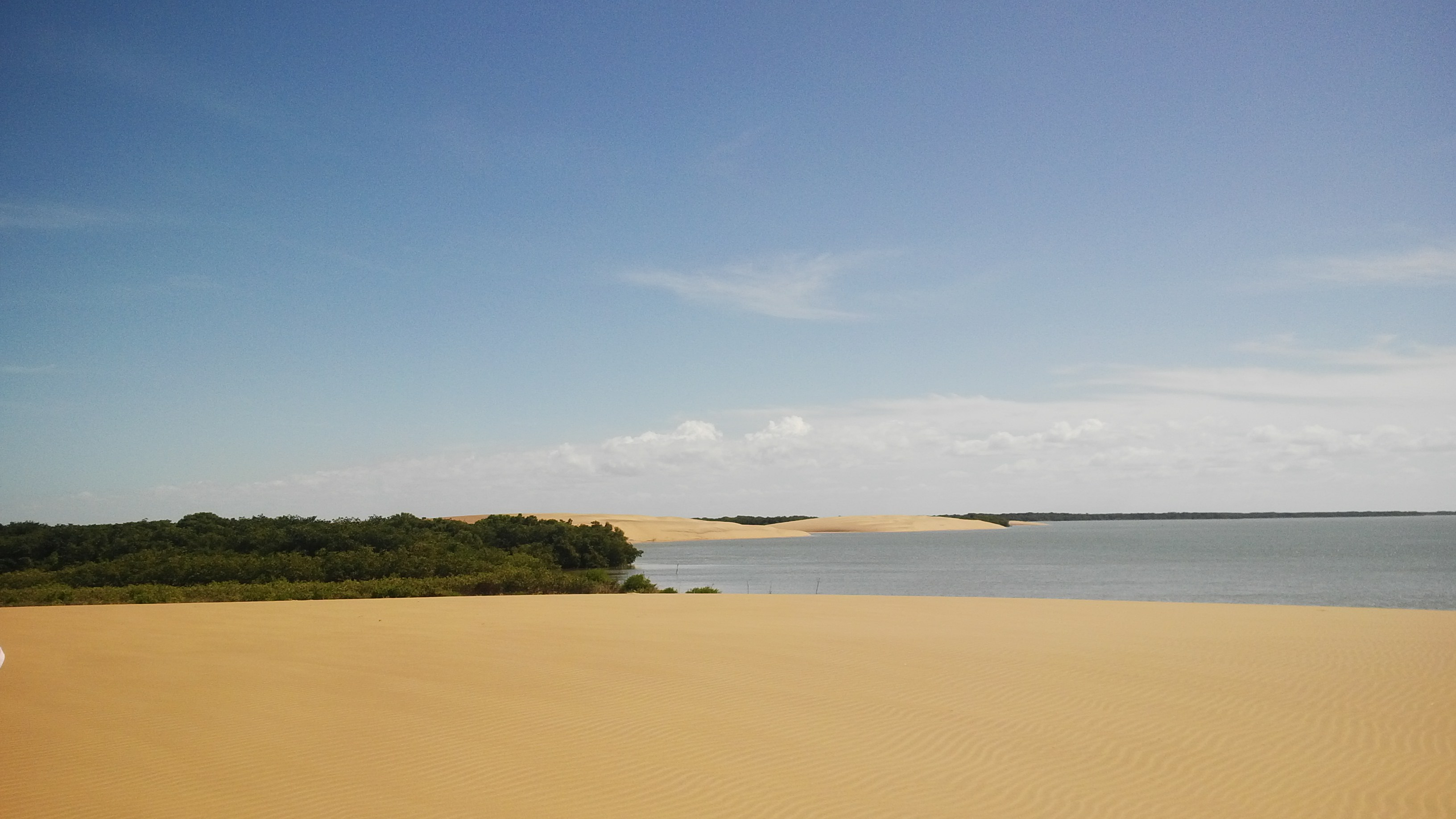
Médanos de Zapara (Zapara Dunes), desert landscape on the island of San Carlos, Zulia State

Zulia encompasses a wide range of geographical features. It includes plains, mountains, and Lake Maracaibo, which receives water and sediment from approximately 135 rivers.

The region also contains lagoons, swamps, and marshes in its lower-lying areas, particularly near the mouths of rivers and in wetland zones such as the Ciénagas del Catatumbo National Park. Zulia features both arid zones and areas of high humidity, reflecting its complex topography and climatic variation. It includes densely populated urban centers, such as Maracaibo, with over 10,000 inhabitants per square kilometer, and vast semi-populated territories like the Perijá mountains and the swamps of Juan Manuel, where population density drops below 10 inhabitants per square kilometer. Some parts of the state are economically prosperous, while others experience significant poverty and underdevelopment, due in part to uneven regional development.

The Lake Maracaibo Basin covers much of the northern and western parts of the state, from the Guajira Peninsula to the Perijá Mountains. The Venezuelan Andean states of Táchira, Mérida and Trujillo border Zulia at the southern end of Lake Maracaibo.

The name Venezuela is believed to have originated from Lake Maracaibo. When Spanish conquistadors sailed into the area, they encountered indigenous communities living in stilt-supported huts along the lake's shore. Reminded of Venice, they named the region "Little Venice" or Venezuela. The lake contains several islands, some of which are inhabited.

Near the mouth of the Catatumbo River, where it flows into Lake Maracaibo, occurs the famous Catatumbo lightning (Relámpago del Catatumbo), which is represented on Zulia's flag and coat of arms by lightning bolts.

Due to its geographical location, Zulia possesses significant geostrategic and geopolitical advantages. The region's diverse geography, geology and hydrography offer a wide range of natural resources, supporting agriculture, livestock, forestry, mining, fishing and tourism. Its infrastructure, particularly lake and marine routes, facilitates international trade, making Zulia an important economic hub in western Venezuela.

Geomorphologically, Zulia can be described as a depression centered around the Lake Maracaibo basin, surrounded by mountains and coastal lowlands. Its geological evolution is linked to the collision of the South American Plate with the Caribbean Plate and remnants of the Nazca Plate. Tectonic activity during the Upper Eocene and Miocene–Pliocene periods shaped the Andes and Perijá Mountains and defined the current landscape of the Maracaibo basin and surrounding plains.

These orogenic processes caused the Perijá Mountains to rise less dramatically than the Andes, resulting in more moderate topography. To the southeast, the Sierra de Ziruma extends as a pre-mountain range composed mainly of Tertiary rocks. According to the most recent classifications, Zulia comprises three primary physical-natural regions: the Perijá Mountain Range, the Corian Sierras, and the Maracaibo basin with its adjoining coastal plains near the Gulf of Venezuela.

=== Perijá mountain range ===
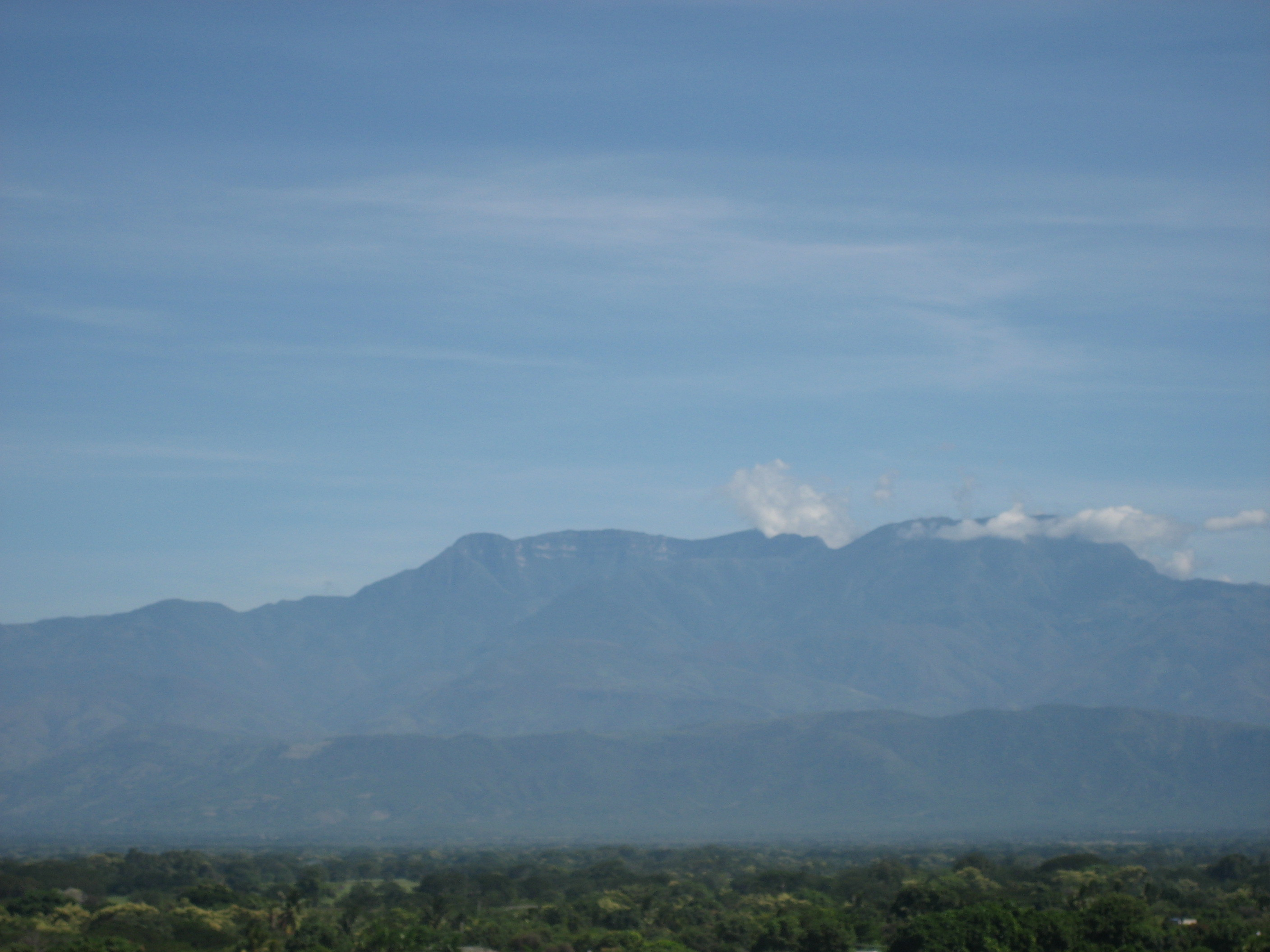
Sierra de Perijá National Park.

The natural region of the Cordillera de Perijá, also known as the western Andean mountain range, is located in the western part of Zulia. This region occupies an area of 4,170.55 km^{2}, representing 12.92% of the state's total area. Portions of Machiques de Perijá, Rosario de Perijá, Jesús Enrique Lossada, Mara, and Guajira fall within this natural region.

The Perijá mountain range is considered a tectonic horst, beginning in the valley of the Intermedio River, extending and narrowing in a south–north direction until it reaches the Montes de Oca, beyond which lie the lowlands of the Guajira isthmus. The range comprises five major landscape units: the Sierra de Motilones, Sierra de Perijá, Sierra de Valledupar, Montes de Oca, and the surrounding foothills and valleys.

=== Valleys ===
Between the Perijá mountain range and Lake Maracaibo lies a broad, flat plain. Due to variations in topography, drainage, soil (edaphic) characteristics, and vegetation, the region can be divided into two distinct zones.

The northwestern area has slightly uneven terrain, with hills in some sectors, a sparse hydrographic network, sandy soils, and low organic matter content.

In contrast, the southern zone, located between the Palmar River and the Catatumbo River, consists of extremely flat, low-lying land. Areas closest to Lake Maracaibo are prone to flooding during the rainy season or when rivers overflow, resulting in the formation of alluvial sandy-clay soils.

=== Lake Maracaibo Depression ===
This natural region includes the 21 municipalities that make up the state of Zulia, occupying an area of 24,377.81 km^{2}, which represents 75.51% of the state's territory. At the center of the depression lies a deeply engraved tectonic basin filled by the waters of the Lake Maracaibo system, where more than 10,000 m^{3} of sediments has accumulated. These sediments, dating from the Cretaceous (Mesozoic) to the Recent Cenozoic, are of both marine and terrestrial origin.

These geological deposits contain a significant accumulation of hydrocarbons, making the Maracaibo Basin one of the richest petroleum regions in South America.

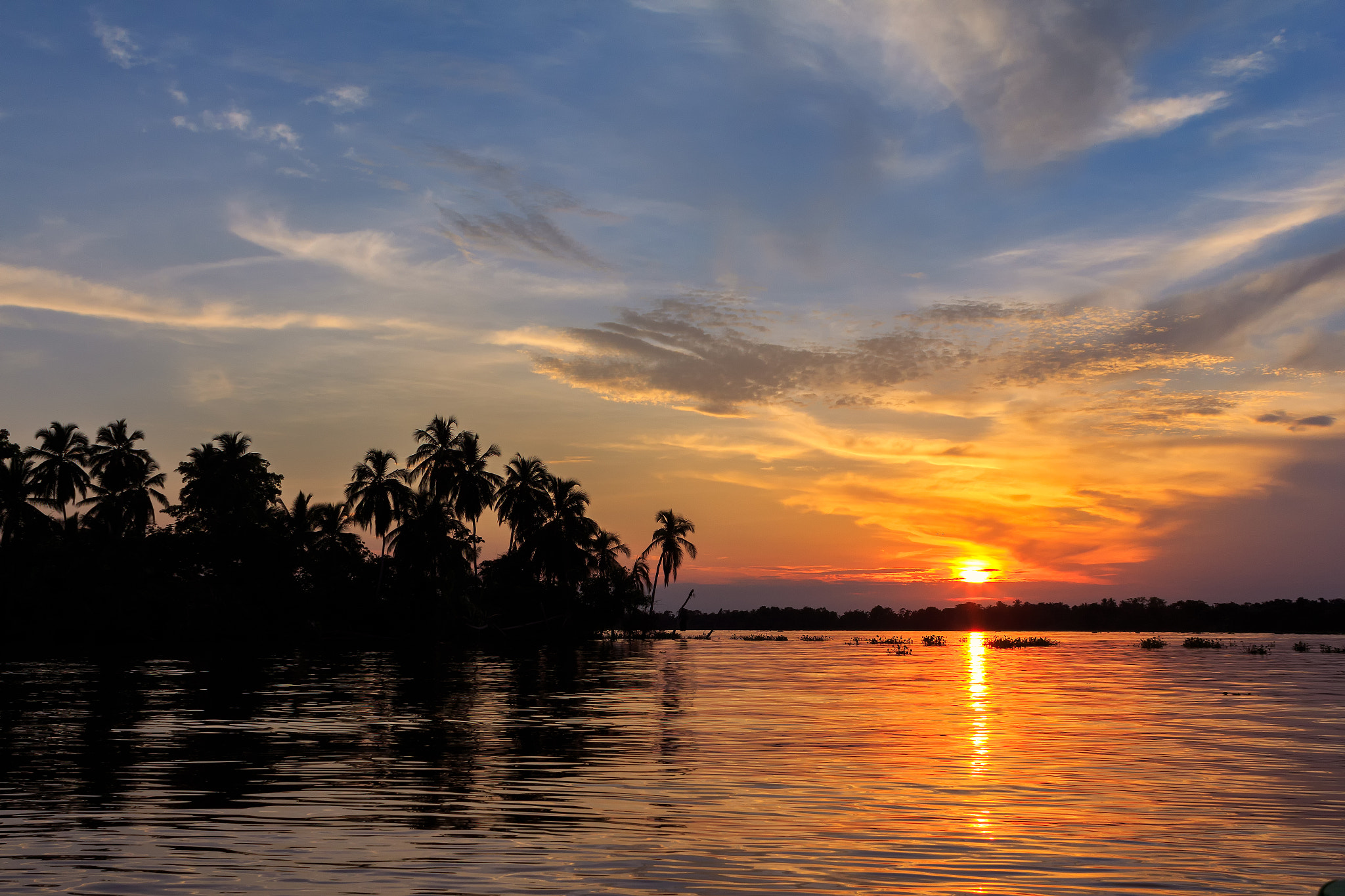
Sunset At Congo Mirador, Maracaibo Lake

The tectonic fossa is a result of orogenesis directly related to the uplift of the Perijá and Andean mountain ranges during the Tertiary period (late Eocene and Oligo-Miocene), as well as the uplift of the Falcón mountain ranges (Oligo-Miocene). This basin occupies approximately 12,870 km^{2} of surface area.

=== Alluvial plains ===
This type of landscape is formed by the deposition of sediments from rivers along the western and eastern margins of the state of Zulia, specifically in the lower courses of the Limón, Guasare, Cachirí, and Socuy rivers (municipalities of Mara Jesús Enrique Lossada) and the Palmar, San Juan, and Apón rivers (municipalities of Rosario de Perijá, Machiques de Perijá, and La Cañada de Urdaneta) in the western alluvial plains.

In the eastern alluvial plains (municipalities of Miranda, Cabimas, Santa Rita, and Lagunillas), the plains are formed by sediments from the Araure, Mene, Ulé, Tamare, Pueblo Viejo, Machango, and Misoa rivers.

These plains are flat, of recent geological origin, and low in elevation, generally ranging from 50 to 100 meters above sea level.

=== Swamps of Southern Lake Maracaibo ===
The swampy landscape of Zulia corresponds to the southern lands of Lake Maracaibo. They occupy an area of 1,766.53 km^{2}, which represents 5% of the state. In this plain, the Santa Ana River system converges, formed on its left bank by the Lora and Aricuaisá Rivers, and by the Tucuro and Río Negro Rivers in their lower course, forming highly floodable lands with numerous river branches, lagoons, and lakes. Among these features, the Ciénagas de Juan Manuel National Park stands out.

To the southeast of the Santa Ana, towards the southern area of the lake, the Catatumbo river system, to which the Socuavó, Tarra, and Zulia rivers drain, also provides significant volumes of water and sediments to the marshes. Toward the southeast of the lake, in the sector located between the Pocó and Escalante rivers, there is close contact with the northwestern Andean slope, and there is a reduced relief of excrement cones, terraces and torrential lava flows that sometimes manifest themselves in low, rounded hills.

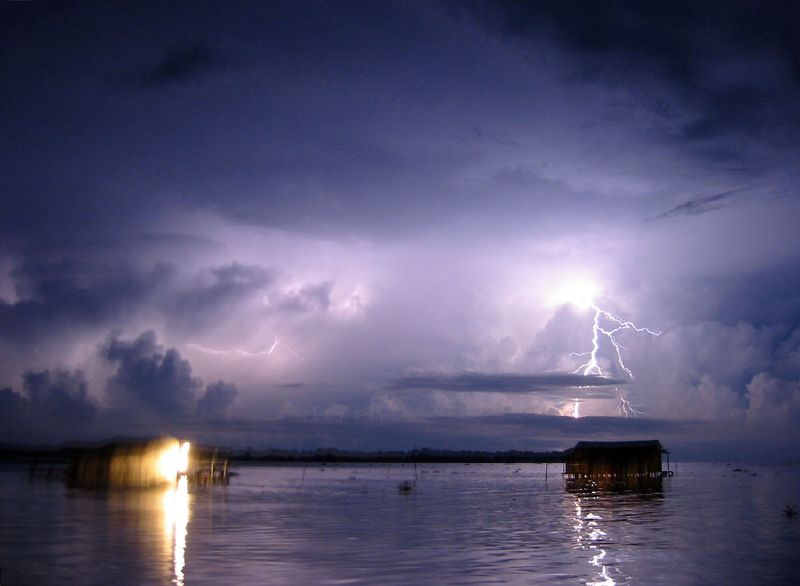
Catatumbo lightning.

=== Climate ===
In the northern sector, a semi-arid climate prevails, with an irregular precipitation regime. The annual mean precipitation registered in Maracaibo ranges between 358 and 665.99 mm (14.094 and 26.220 in), with a median temperature of 28 °C (82 °F). Precipitation increases in the western and eastern regions of Lake Maracaibo, forming a wet tropical savanna climate, with average annual temperatures ranging from 27 °C to 28 °C, and rainfall exceeding 1,000 mm (39 in), as recorded in Mene Grande. In the southern lake region, increased rainfall conforms to a tropical rainforest climate with an average annual precipitation of 2,556 mm, surpassing 3,500 mm per year in the highlands of the Serrania de Perija.

The geographical location and the diversity of natural landscapes present in Zulia, along with the presence of Lake Maracaibo, contribute to the wide variety of climates in the state. According to Köppen climate classification, these include desert climates (Bwhi), semi-and tropical climates (BSh), tropical savannah and sub-humid forest climates (Aw), tropical rainforest and savannah (Aw), tropical monsoon (Am), tropical rainforest (Af), very humid tropical temperate (Cfa), humid tropical temperate (Cwa), and undefined mountain climates.

Lake Maracaibo and its basin work together to produce high levels of rainfall. However, in the northern part of the state, the wind combined with flat terrain causes arid conditions, with average annual precipitation ranging between 200 mm and 600 mm and annual evaporation surpassing precipitation. For example, Maracaibo recorded an average annual evaporation of 2,339 mm during the 1993-2003 period.

Precipitation distribution in Zulia is influenced by latitude, showing an increase from north to south in the average annual precipitation of the Maracaibo (488 mm), Cabimas (528.9 mm) and Santa Bárbara (1,366.5 mm) stations. This trend follows a latitudinal gradient, except for the El Tucuco station (2,032.9 mm), where elevated rainfall is explained by its altitude (205 meters above sea level), with orography enhancing precipitation.

=== Hydrography ===
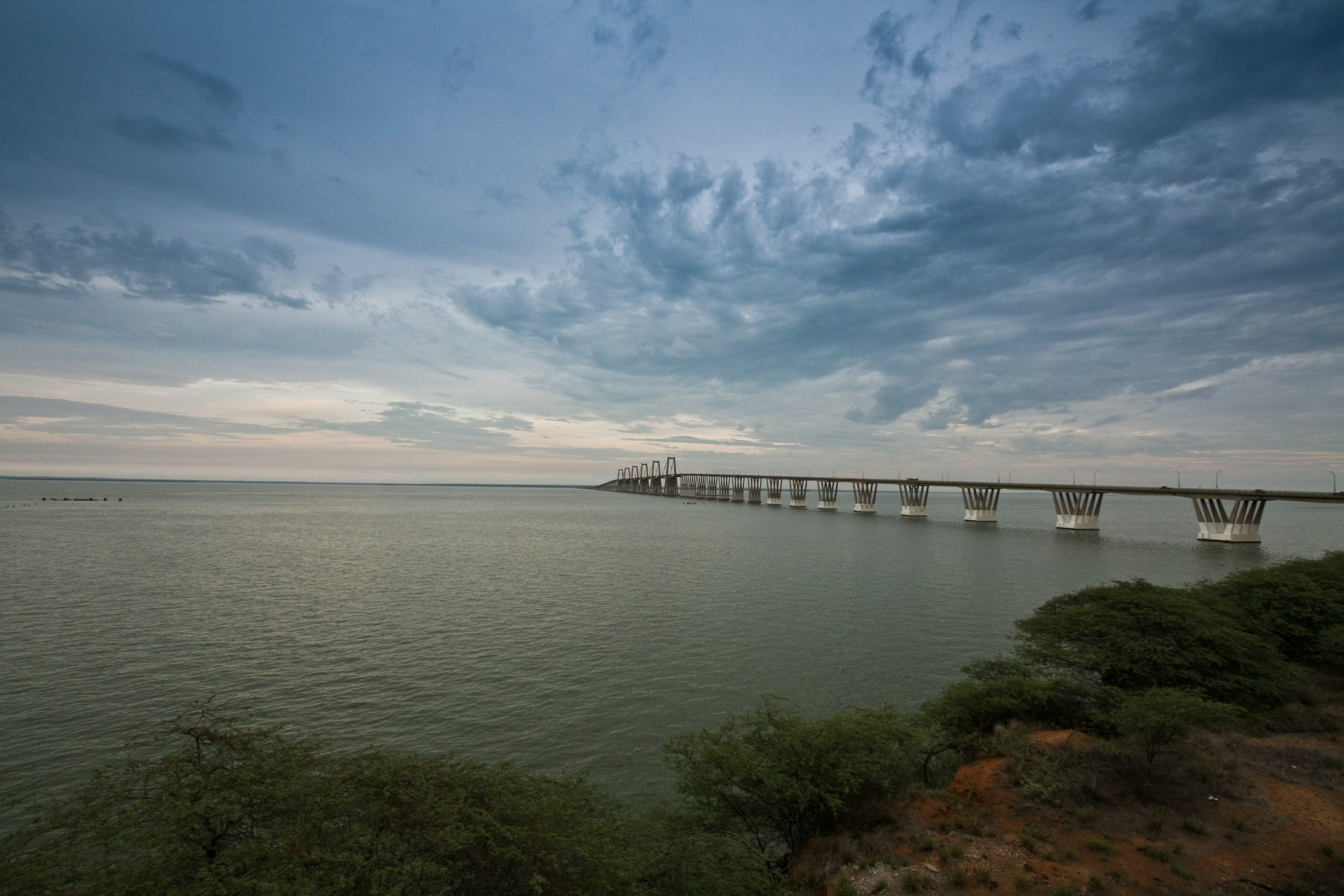
Maracaibo Lake

The geomorphological structure of Zulia is a semicircular depression that defines a hydrographic pattern classified as radial drainage—in which water from surrounding divides flows toward a common outlet: Lake Maracaibo. This characteristic pattern is shaped by the state's topography.

Zulia's hydrographic network comprises numerous river basins and sub-basins covering parts of Zulia, Lara, Táchira, Mérida, Trujillo, and parts of Colombia, primarily drained by the Catatumbo River and its tributaries. All of these rivers flow into the interconnected system of Lake Maracaibo, the strait of Maracaibo, and El Tablazo Bay.

Some sources classify the Maracaibo system as consisting of four closely related water bodies: the Gulf of Venezuela, El Tablazo Bay, the Maracaibo Strait, and Lake Maracaibo. Although the estuarine zone is primarily made up of the strait and bay, the estuarine biota cannot be fully understood without considering all adjacent waters.

The Gulf of Venezuela plays a key role in the oceanic dynamics of the region, due to the depth, movement and chemical composition of its waters. These physical and chemical features influence the gulf's capacity to absorb and dilute pollutants. Located north of the Maracaibo depression, the Gulf of Venezuela spans approximately 17,840 km^{2}, excluding El Tablazo Bay. It has a roughly rectangular shape, with a major axis oriented northeast–southwest. Its outer boundary with the Caribbean Sea is defined by a line stretching from Punta Espada to Punta Macolla, measuring 111.12 km.

The gulf experiences a variety of water movements, including tides, sea currents, and mass water inversions, which contribute to its oxygenation and pollutant dilution capacity. Due to the arid climate of the surrounding continental territory, few rivers flow directly into the gulf. The main hydrological contributions come from the mountainous regions of Falcón State.

Within the Lake Maracaibo basin, 21 major sub-basins have been identified, some extending beyond the political boundaries of Zulia. The most significant is the Catatumbo River Basin, covering 25,708.36 km^{2}-representing more than a quarter (32.60%) of the total Maracaibo basin area.

=== Soils ===
The soils of Zulia, situated within the Lake Maracaibo depression, result from the interaction of various factors, including relief, climate, parent material, vegetation, and soil formation processes.

Zulia's edaphic diversity reflects the state's physiography and climatic conditions. To differentiate the existing soil types, the territory is typically divided into sectors. Although these areas may not be spatially continuous, they share similarities in soil characteristics.

=== Vegetation ===
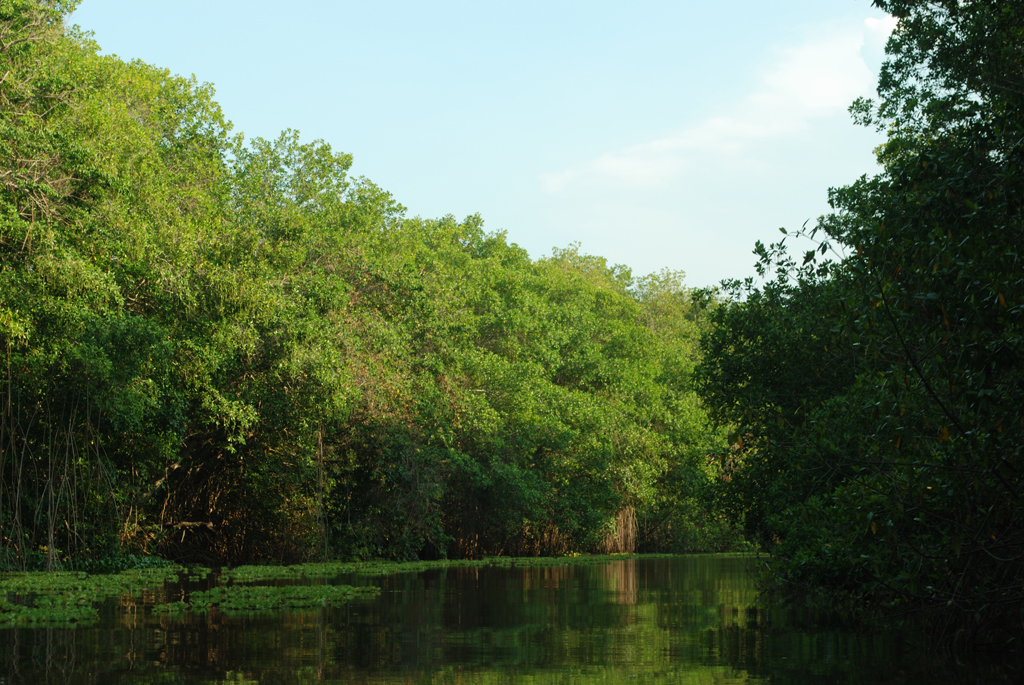
Mangroves in the Sinamaica Lagoon

Zulia, due to its large territorial extension and the significant variability in landscape, climate, and soil, supports a great diversity of plant ecosystems. According to Huber's classification, these can be grouped into tree, shrub, and herbaceous formations. Tree formations include coastal mangroves, dry to semi-deciduous lowland forests, lowland evergreen forests, and mountain forests.

It is estimated that the total area of mangroves in Zulia occupies 116.3 km^{2} (44.9 mi^{2}), located in the Cocinetas, Peonias, Sinamaica and Los Olivitos lagoons, as well as the mouth of the Limón River. The coastal wetlands of the entire Maracaibo system are estimated to cover 5,683 km^{2} (2,194 mi^{2}), with notable areas in the southern lake region including the swamps of Juan Manuel de Aguas Claras and Aguas Negras. Mangrove vegetation is generally dense and composed of predominant species such as red mangrove (Rhizophora mangle), black and pink mangrove (Avicennia germinans), white mangrove (Laguncularia racemosa), and the buttonwood mangrove (Conocarpus erectus).

The dry semi-deciduous lowland forest category occupies the largest area in the region, approximately 18,872.7 km^{2} (7,286.8 mi^{2}). These plant formations are found along the western coast in the municipalities of Páez, Mara, Maracaibo, Jesús Enrique Lossada, San Francisco, La Cañada de Urdaneta, Rosario de Perijá, Machiques de Perijá, and parts of Catatumbo and Jesús María Semprúm.

On the eastern coast, they are distributed in the municipalities of Miranda, Santa Rita, Cabimas, Simón Bolívar, Lagunillas, and parts of Valmore Rodríguez. In the municipality of Páez, these formations occur in dry climates with an annual average temperature of 28 °C (82.4 °F), average annual rainfall of 125 mm to 250 mm (5 inches to 10 inches), and on Aridisol and Entisol soils. Vegetation varies in size, density, and species composition from the coastal zone to the foothills of the Oca mountains.

=== Fauna ===
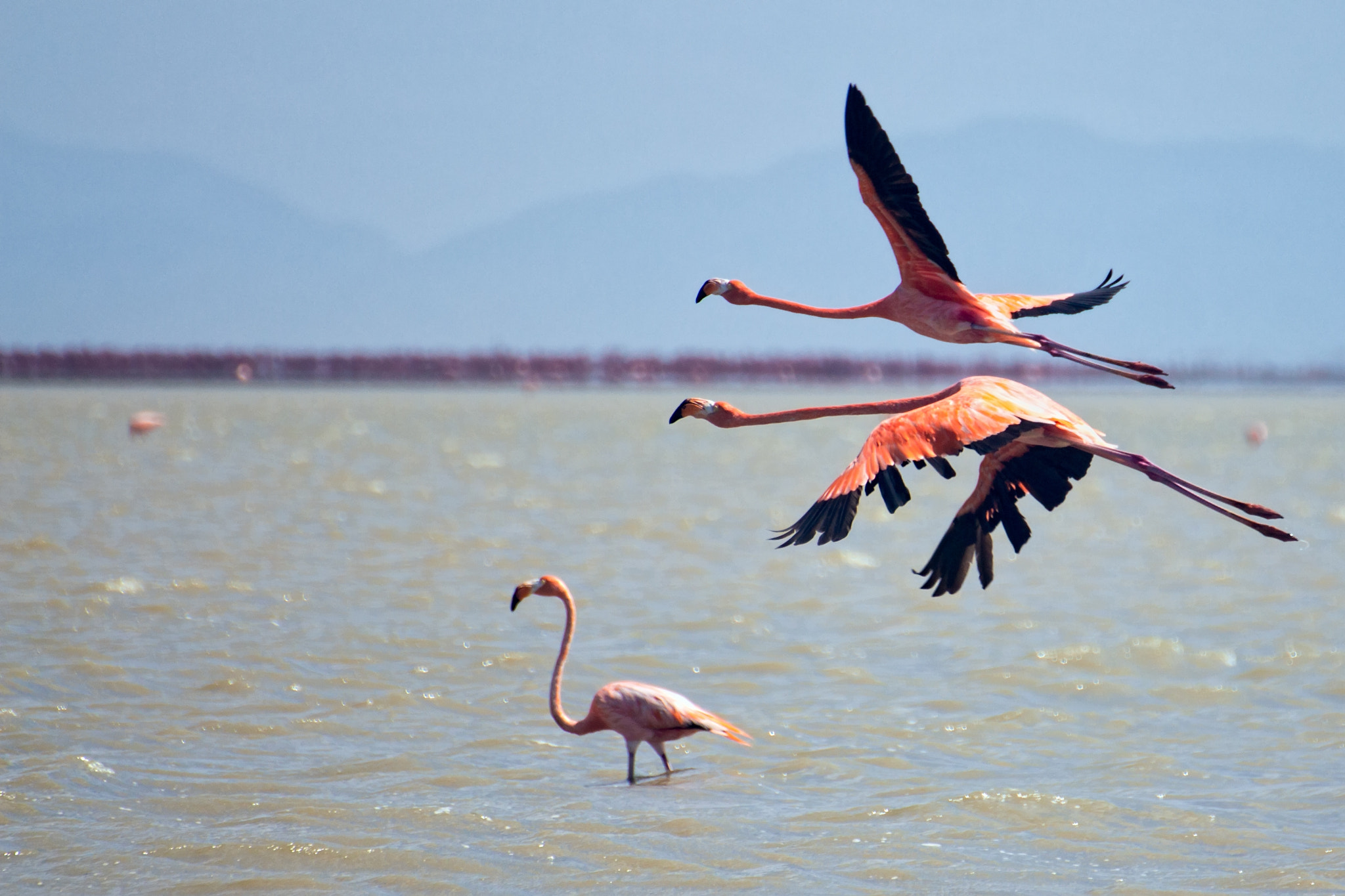
Flamingos in the Ciénaga de Los Olivitos, a Wildlife Refuge and Fishing Reserve in the Municipality of Miranda

The fauna of Zulia is distributed according to its terrestrial or aquatic habitats, including both freshwater and marine environments, as well as lentic, lotic, and ecotone ecosystems. The dry subregion comprises the municipalities of Páez, Mara, Maracaibo, Miranda, Jesús Enrique Lossada, Cabinas, La Cañada de Urdaneta, and Lagunillas. This area is home to vulnerable animal populations at high risk of extinction in the medium term.

Among the mammals, the giant anteater (Myrmecophaga tridactyla), found especially in the northeast of the Lake Maracaibo basin, is threatened by poaching and often found dead on roadways. The ocelot (Leopardus pardalis) inhabits thorn forests, scrublands, and even mangrove forests. Though once more common, it is now threatened by indiscriminate hunting and habitat destruction, despite being under a permanent hunting ban.

Other mammals of lower concern include the endemic brownish-gray matacán deer (Mazama gouazoubira), found in arid areas and hunted for its highly valued meat, and the white-tailed deer (Odocoileus virginianus gymnotis), which has declined by nearly 50% in Zulia's arid zones due to unregulated hunting. The desert yellow bat (Rhogeessa minutilla), found in the northeast and northwest, has seen habitat loss due to livestock expansion.

Among birds, the most threatened is the red siskin (Carduelis cucullata), prized for its bright plumage and used historically as hat decorations. Other notable species include the American flamingo (Phoenicopterus ruber), found in the Los Olivitos lagoon (Miranda Municipality) and Gran Eneal lagoon (Páez Municipality). While not endangered, flamingos face habitat degradation, prompting conservation efforts.

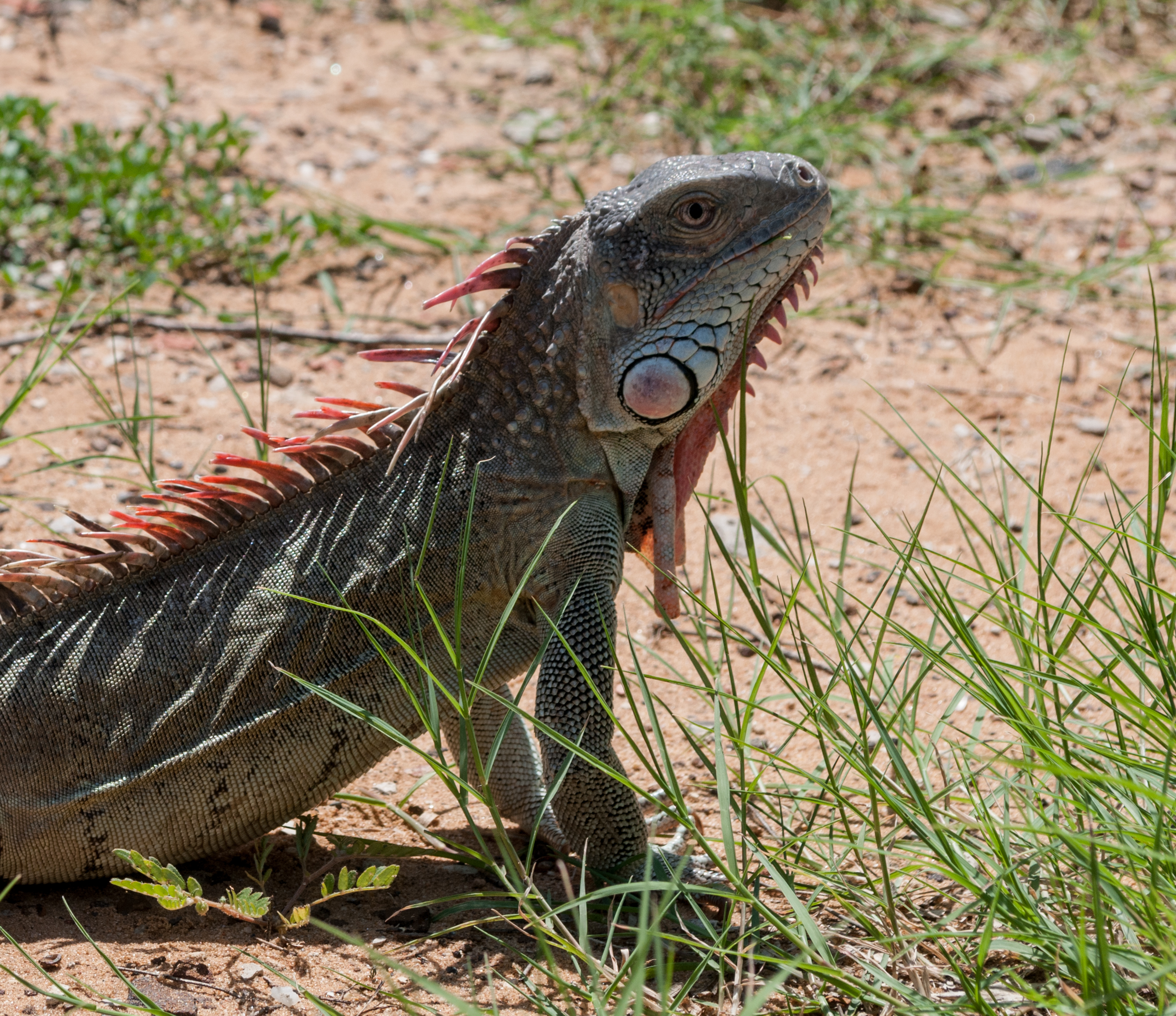
Iguana on the Vereda del Lago

Reptiles include the American crocodile (Crocodylus acutus), now largely restricted to the Pueblo Viejo reservoir (Lagunillas), where it is endangered due to poaching for its skin. Also present is the red-footed tortoise (Geochelone carbonaria), found in dry forests and illegally collected. Two species named in honor of the region are the turtle Mesoclemmys zuliae and the lizard Maracaiba zuliae.

In the humid and sub-humid subregions—southeast, south, and southwest of Lake Maracaibo—animal populations overlap with those in dry areas, especially birds. However, additional species appear, such as the white-bellied spider monkey (Ateles belzebuth hybridus), native to humid forests of the Lake Maracaibo Basin, including those in the Perijá Mountains.

The Perijá subregion, a mountainous area, supports diverse ecosystems with mammals, birds, reptiles, amphibians, and fish. Notably, the spectacled bear (Tremarctos ornatus) is critically endangered due to illegal hunting, despite being found in protected zones under Venezuelan law.

== Government and politics ==
=== State Constitution ===
Since the creation of the Sovereign State of Zulia on February 17, 1864, with the approval of its first state constitution, the document has regulated the structure and function of Zulia's government. Like all Venezuelan state constitutions, it is subject to national judicial review, and any provision may be annulled if it conflicts with national law or the Constitution of the Bolivarian Republic of Venezuela.

The current Constitution of the State of Zulia was promulgated on August 13, 2003, and partially amended in 2011. It repealed the 1989 constitution and its partial amendments from 1993 and 2001.

=== Executive Power ===
The executive power is represented by the Governor of Zulia. The governor is elected through direct and secret universal suffrage by all Venezuelan citizens residing in Zulia and registered in the state's electoral roll.

To hold the office of governor, a person must be a Venezuelan citizen by birth with no other nationality, in full enjoyment of civil rights, over 25 years of age, and must have resided in the state for at least four years prior to the election (according to Article 69 of the Zulian constitution. Religious ministers and individuals holding national, state, or municipal office must step down from their positions before running.

The governor serves a four-year term and may be re-elected an unlimited number of times.

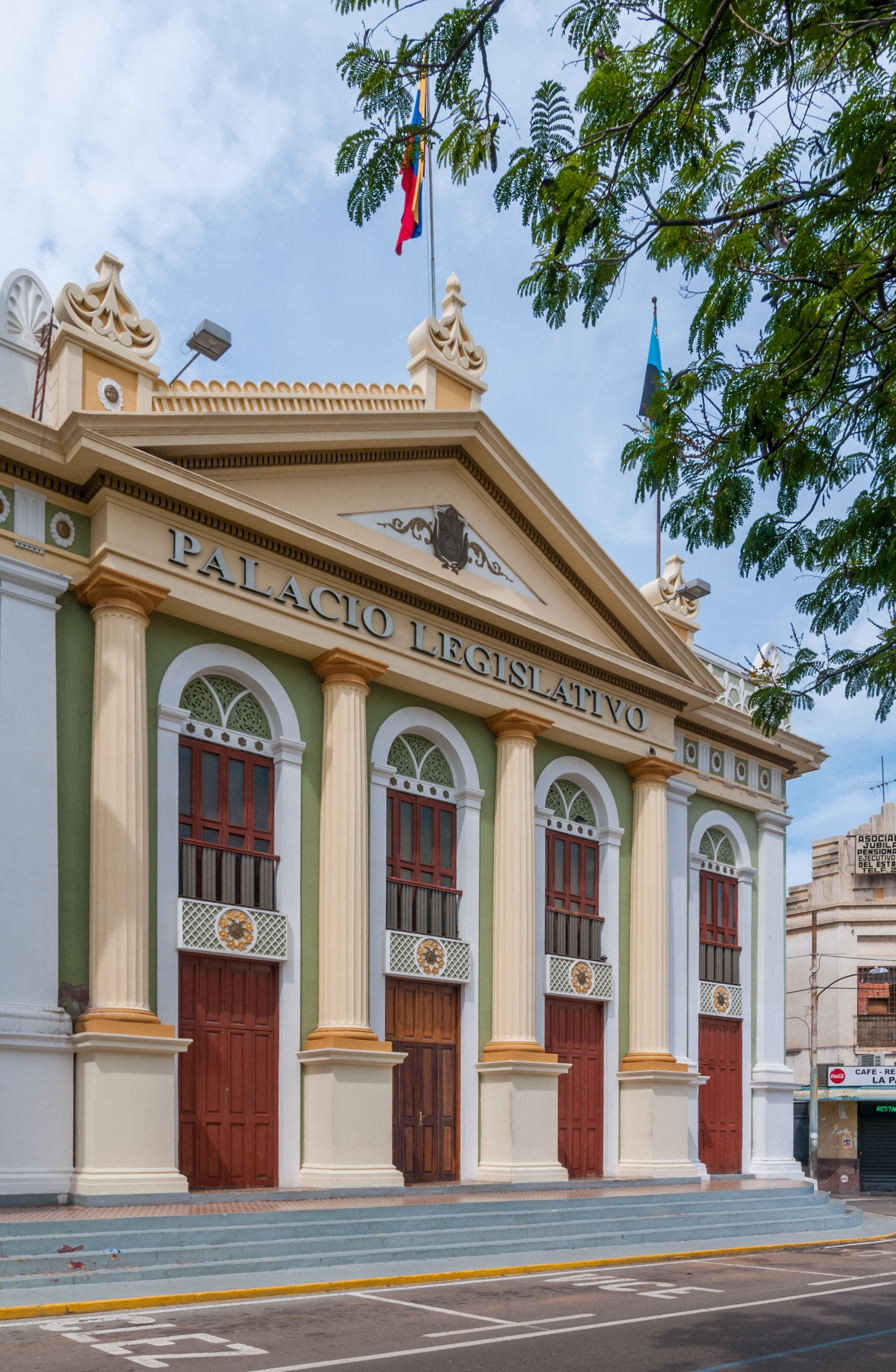
Maracaibo Legislative Palace, seat of the regional parliament since 1880

According to the state constitution, the governor is supported by a Council of Secretaries, including the General Secretariat of Government, and secretariats for Education, Infrastructure, Administration, Citizen Security and Defense, Culture, Higher Education Promotion, Health, Environment, Lands, and Territorial Planning, among others.

=== Legislative Power ===
The regional parliament is represented by the Legislative Council of Zulia, a unicameral body. It has the power to discuss and enact the Zulian constitution, pass laws within its jurisdiction, reform existing laws, or repeal those deemed obsolete. The council is also responsible for approving the regional budget and overseeing the actions of the executive branch.

The Legislative Council consists of 15 members known as "Legislators." In the most recent election, the state was divided into 11 electoral districts. Voters in each district elect a number of legislators proportional to the population of their respective municipalities, according to the official census by the National Institute of Statistics (INE). Legislators serve renewable four-year terms and are elected by popular vote in accordance with the Zulian and national constitutions.

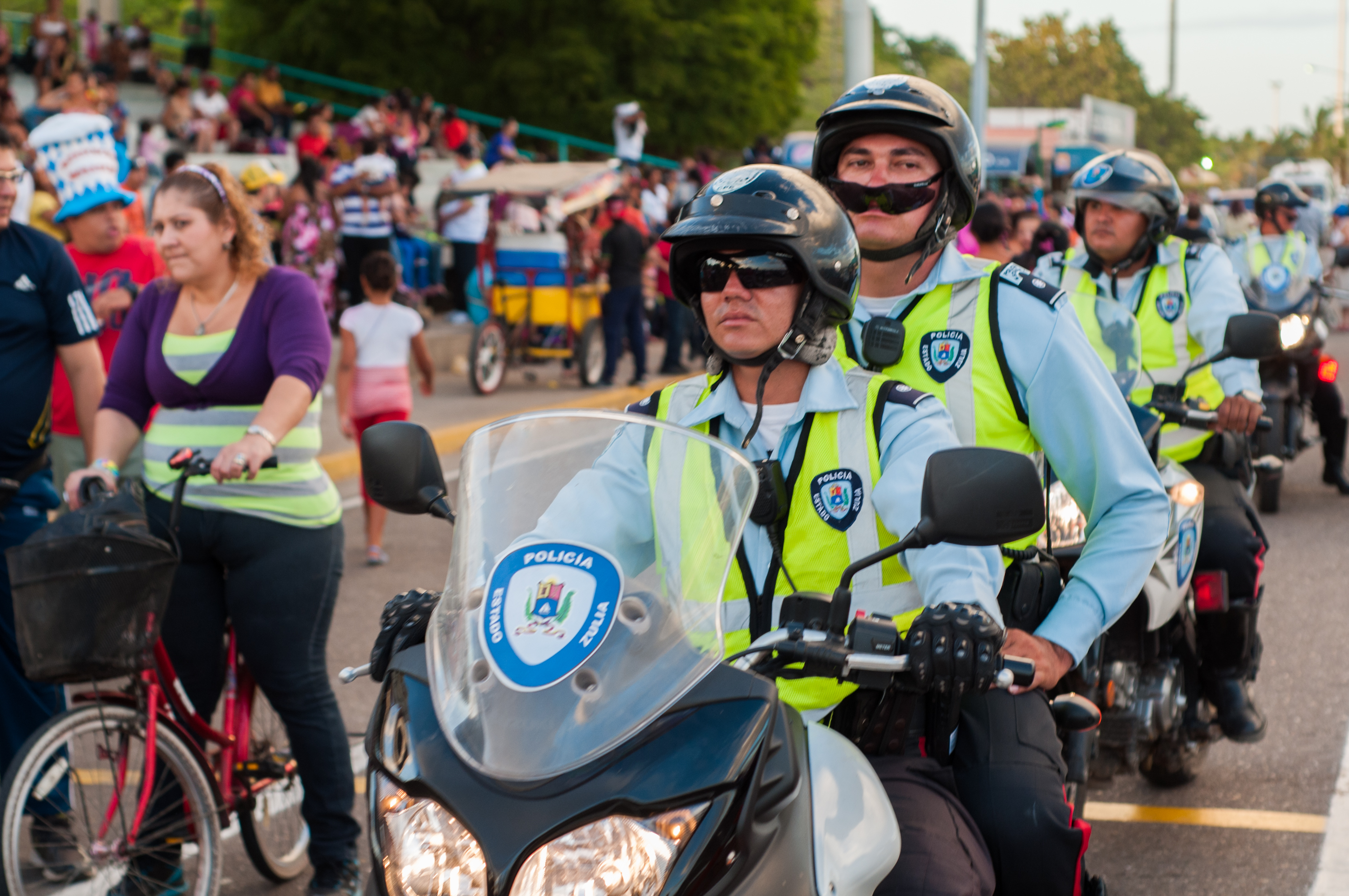
Regional Police of the State of Zulia

=== Security ===
Security and public order in the state are the responsibility of the Regional Police of Zulia, officially known as the Corps of Police of the State of Zulia, which operates under the authority of the state government. At the municipal level, most local governments maintain their own police forces, established through decentralization and based on the provisions of Article 164 of the Constitution of Venezuela (1999) and Article 25 of the Constitution of the State of Zulia (2003).

Like the other 23 federal entities of Venezuela, Zulia maintains its own police force, which is supported and complemented by the Bolivarian National Police and the Bolivarian National Guard of Venezuela.

== Municipalities and municipal seats ==
Zulia covers an area of 63,100 km^{2}, which represents 5.50% of Venezuela's national territory. This area includes continental, insular, lacustrine, and maritime zones. The continental territory is divided into 21 municipalities (municipios), with the largest by area being Machiques de Perijá (18.90%), Jesús María Semprún (11.95%), Catatumbo (10.40%), Rosario de Perijá (7.79%) and Colón (6.71%), which together account for more than 50% of the state's total area.

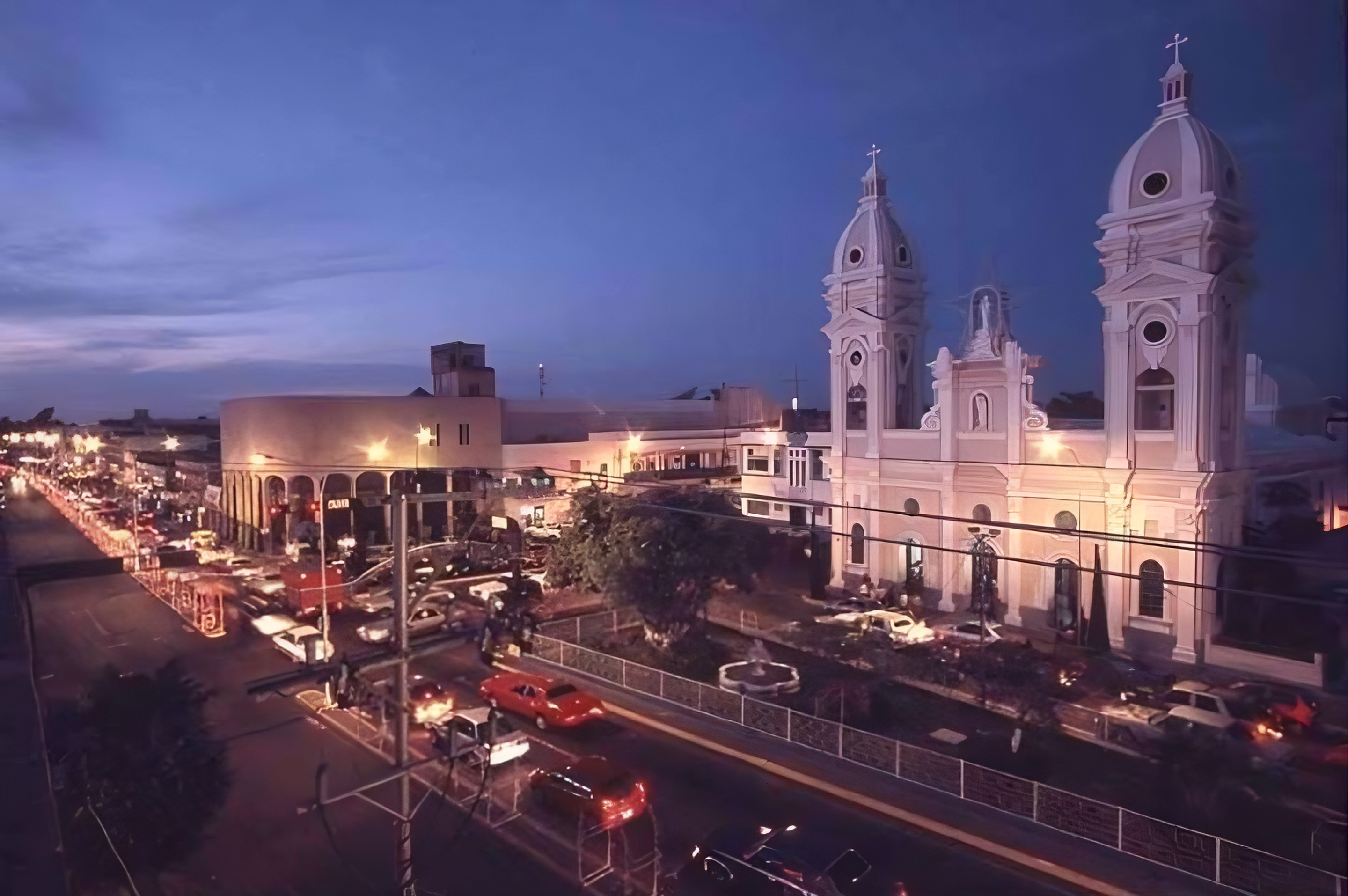
Our Lady of the Rosary Cathedral in Cabimas

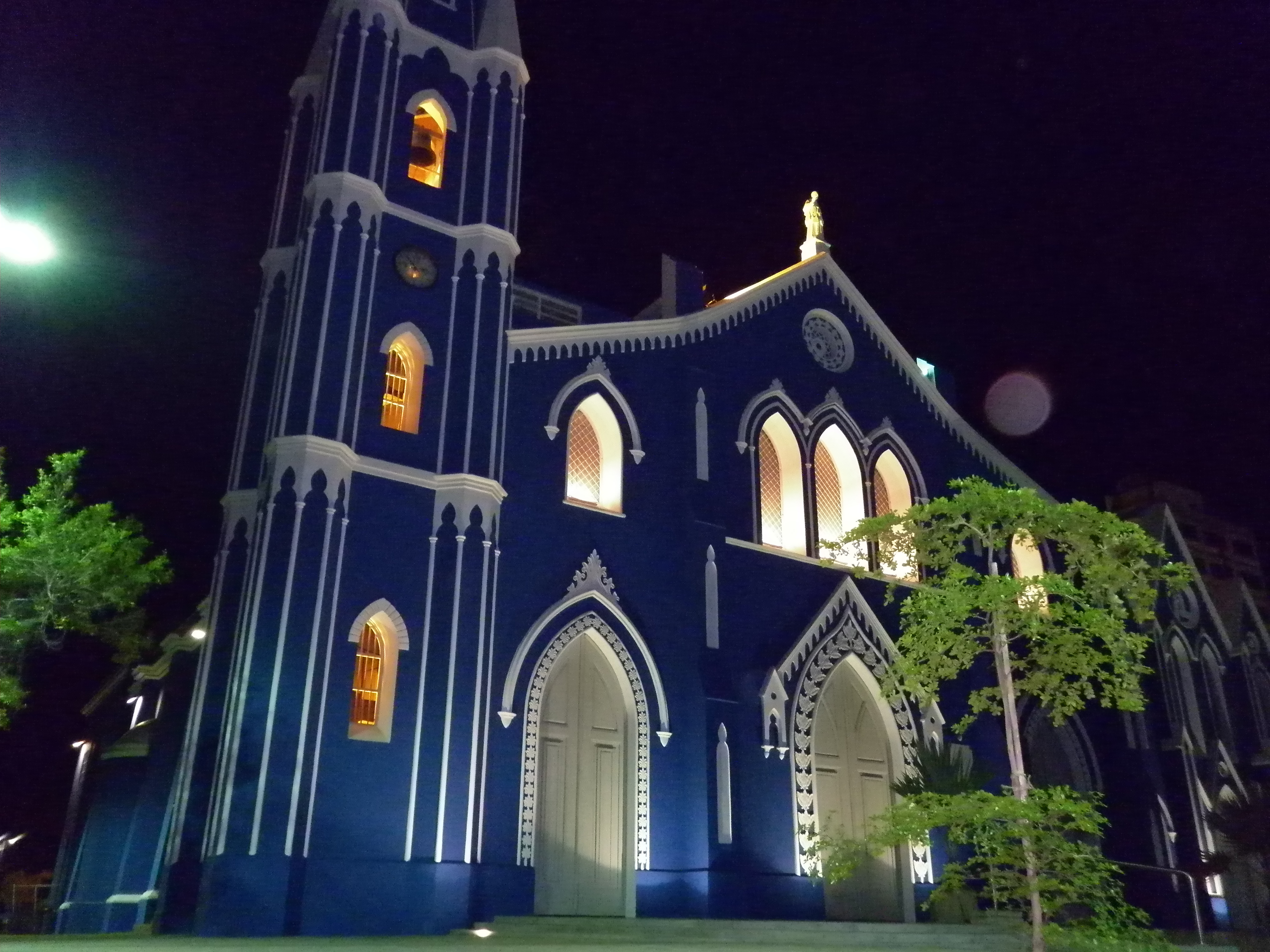
Santa Barbara church

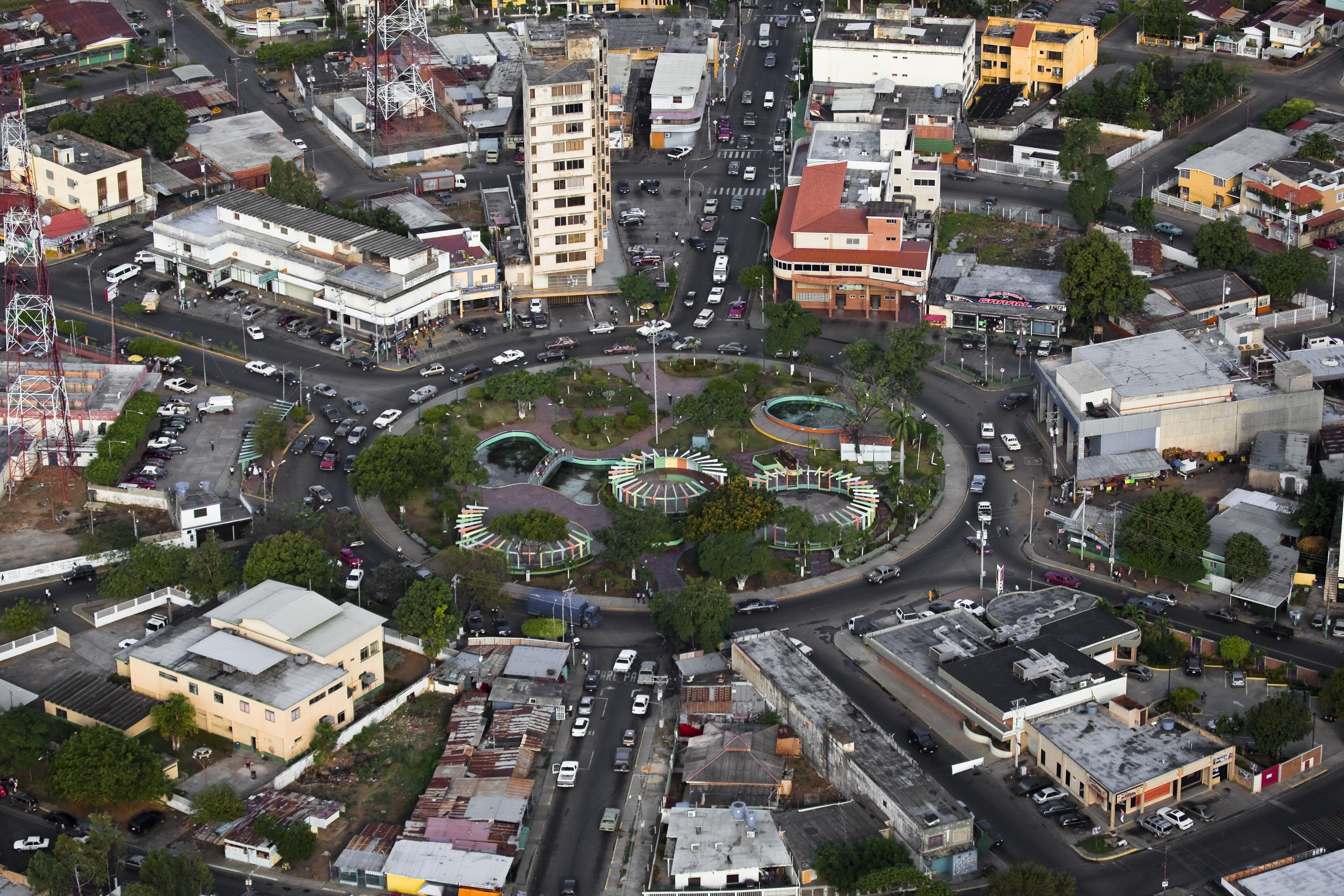
Ciudad Ojeda city centre

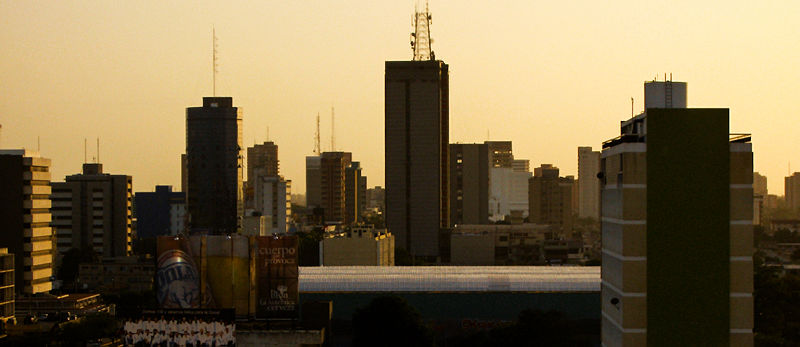
Maracaibo's 5 de Julio area

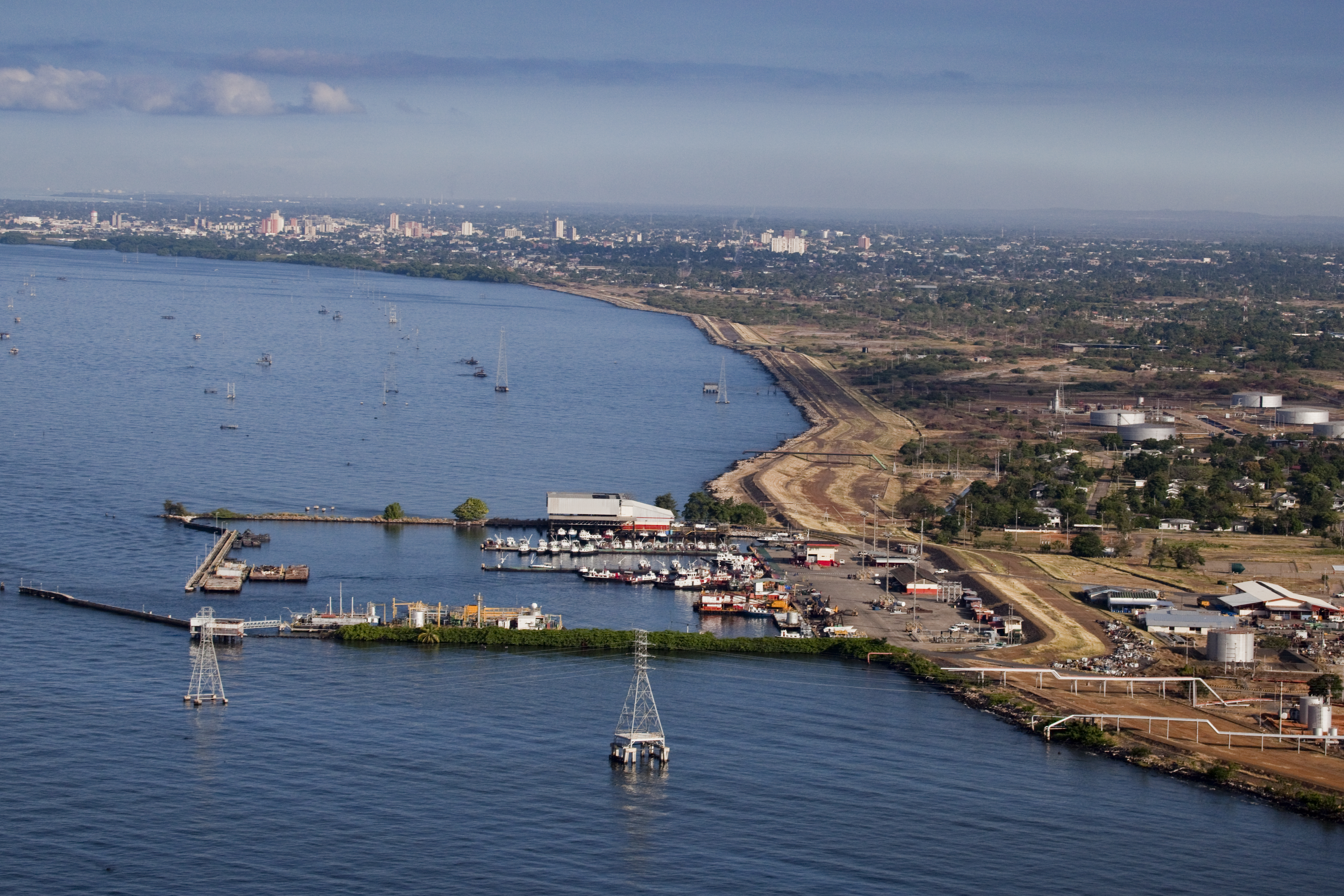
Lagunillas and Ciudad Ojeda in the background

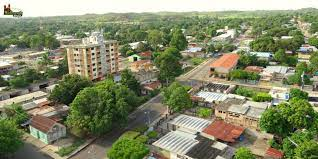
View of Machiques

	Municipality	Area in km^{2}	Population (2011 census, preliminary)	Seat
1.	Almirante Padilla	151	11,929	El Toro
2.	Baralt	2,211	89,847	San Timoteo, Venezuela
3.	Cabimas	655	263,056	Cabimas
4.	Catatumbo	5,225	40,702	Encontrados
5.	Colón	3,368	128,729	San Carlos del Zulia
6.	Francisco Javier Pulgar	800	33,942	Pueblo Nuevo El Chivo
7.	Guajira	2,370	65,545	Sinamaica
8.	Jesús Enrique Lossada	3,533	118,756	La Concepción
9.	Jesús María Semprún	6,003	30,484	Casigua-El Cubo
10.	La Cañada de Urdaneta	2,073	82,210	Concepción
11.	Lagunillas	1,024	203,435	Ciudad Ojeda
12.	Machiques de Perijá	9,493	122,734	Machiques
13.	Mara	3,588	207,221	San Rafael del Moján
14.	Maracaibo	419	1,459,448	Maracaibo
15.	Miranda	2,255	97,463	Los Puertos de Altagracia
16.	Rosario de Perijá	3,914	85,006	La Villa del Rosario
17.	San Francisco	185	446,757	San Francisco
18.	Santa Rita	578	59,866	Santa Rita
19.	Simón Bolívar	219	43,831	Tía Juana
20.	Sucre	874	60,819	Bobures
21.	Valmore Rodríguez	1,292	52,624	Bachaquero

Zulia by municipality

== Economy ==
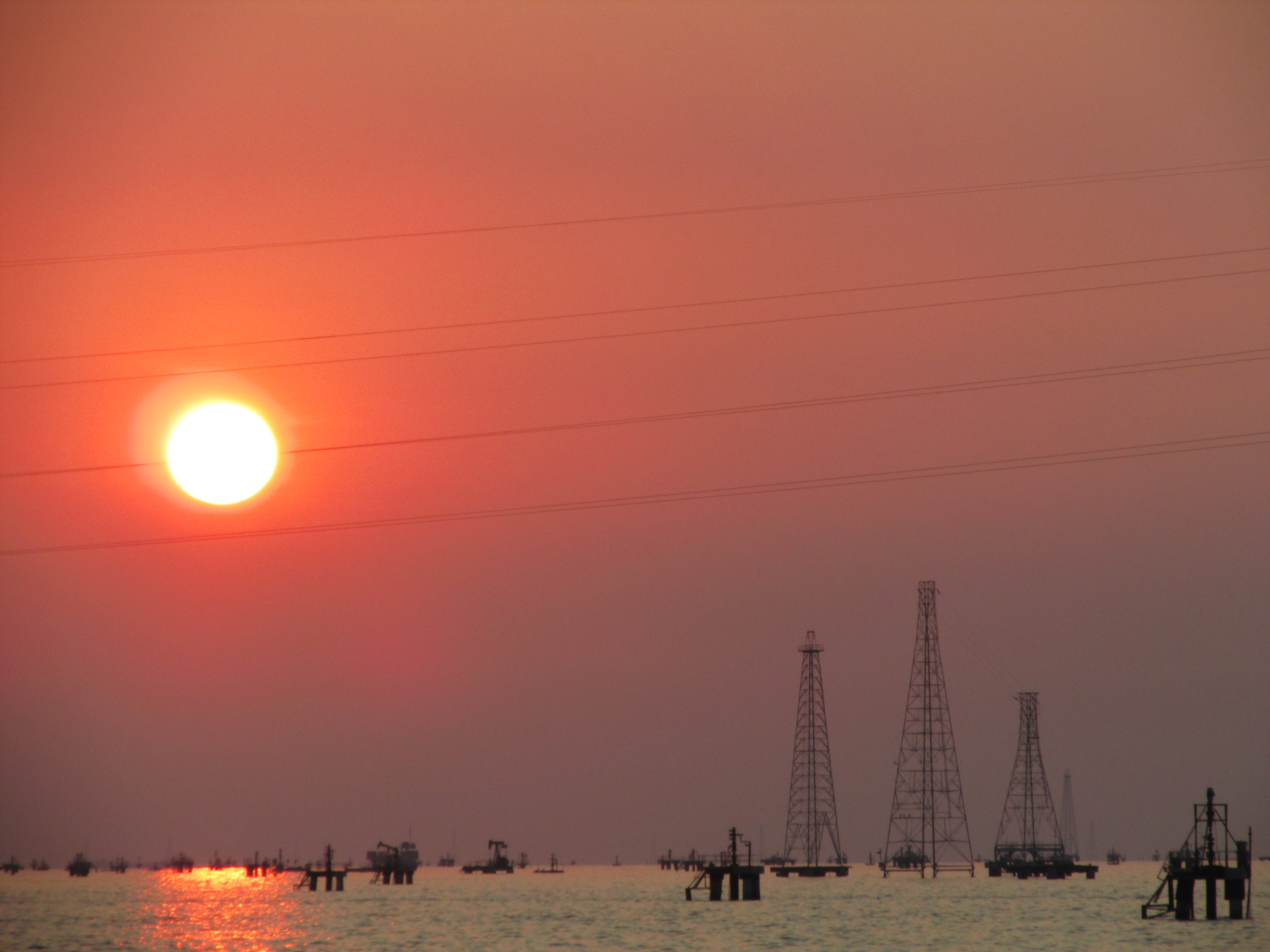
Oil structures on the Costa Oriental del Lago Region

The region possesses significant economic resources, including livestock, petroleum, mining, agriculture, and cheese production. Its economy is primarily based on oil and natural gas. Oil activity has been conducted intensively since 1912, both on land and in Lake Maracaibo, generating income that extends beyond the regional scope, as it serves as a major pillar of the national economy. Zulia contributes a large share of the country's oil and hydrocarbon production. Additionally, the coal mines of El Guasare are among the most important in Venezuela.

The high potential of the soils in the southern region of Lake Maracaibo supports significant agricultural and livestock development. Zulia ranks first nationally in the production of several agricultural and livestock products: oil palm, grapes, milk, cheese, cattle, sheep, and poultry; second in eggs; and third in bananas, plantains (cambur), and goats. Other crops include sugarcane, coconut, cassava (yucca), cotton, beans, melon, and sorghum. Forest production is also notable.

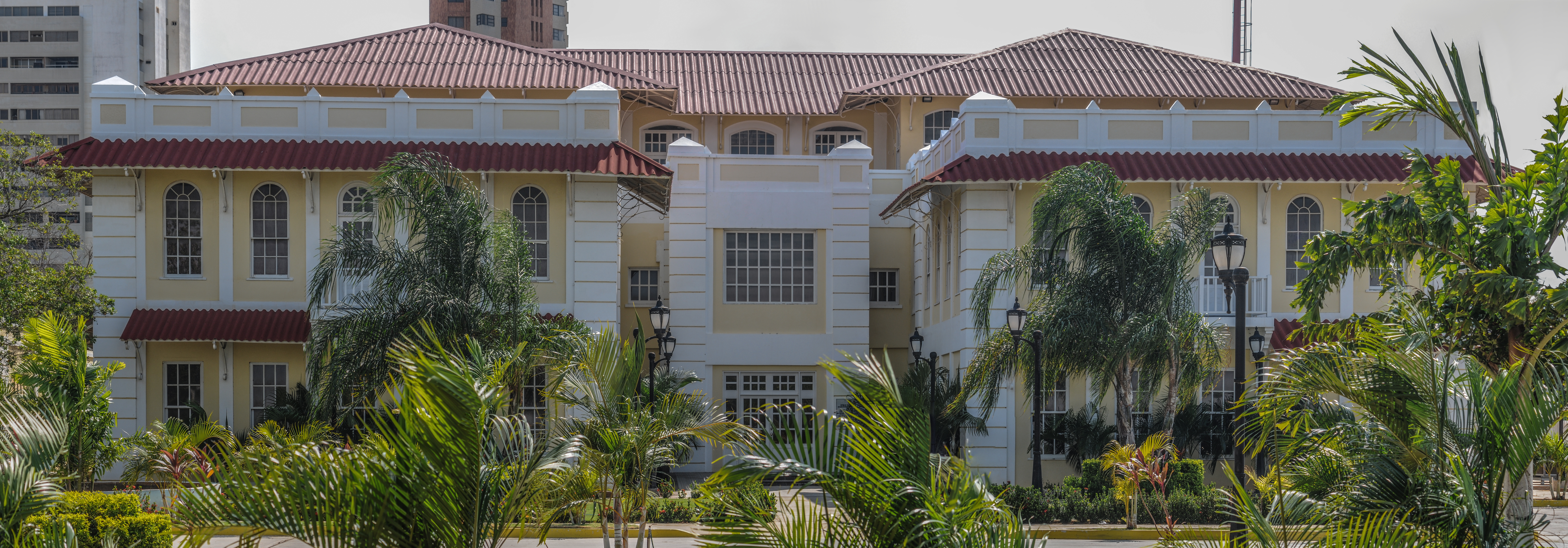
Former headquarters of the Mene Grande Oil Company

Maritime resources make Zulia the second-largest supplier of fish in Venezuela. In Lake Maracaibo, the main species caught include bass, horse mackerel, mackerel, blue crab, smallmouth bass, mojarra (morning), and seabass. In the Gulf of Venezuela, the catch includes dogfish, horse mackerel, grouper, and snapper. Shrimp was once abundant prior to the 1970s, but overfishing led to a marked decline in their population.

== Demographics ==
Historical population
Year	Pop.	±% p.a.
1873	59,235	—
1881	72,509	+2.56%
1891	85,456	+1.66%
1920	119,458	+1.16%
1926	204,075	+9.34%
1936	275,421	+3.04%
1941	345,667	+4.65%
1950	560,336	+5.51%
1961	919,863	+4.61%
1971	1,299,030	+3.51%
1981	1,674,252	+2.57%
1990	2,235,305	+3.26%
2001	2,983,679	+2.66%
2011	3,704,404	+2.19%

There is significant ethnic and racial diversity in Zulia. The migration of Venezuelans from other regions and immigrants from neighboring countries, combined with the presence of indigenous communities, has contributed to the state's rich and unique cultural identity.

=== Race and ethnicity ===
The demonym for the people of the Zulia is Zulians. According to the 2011 census, the racial composition of the population was as follows:

Racial composition	Population	%
Mestizo	1,863,315	50.3
White	1,715,139	46.3
Black	103,723	2.8
Other races	22,227	0.6

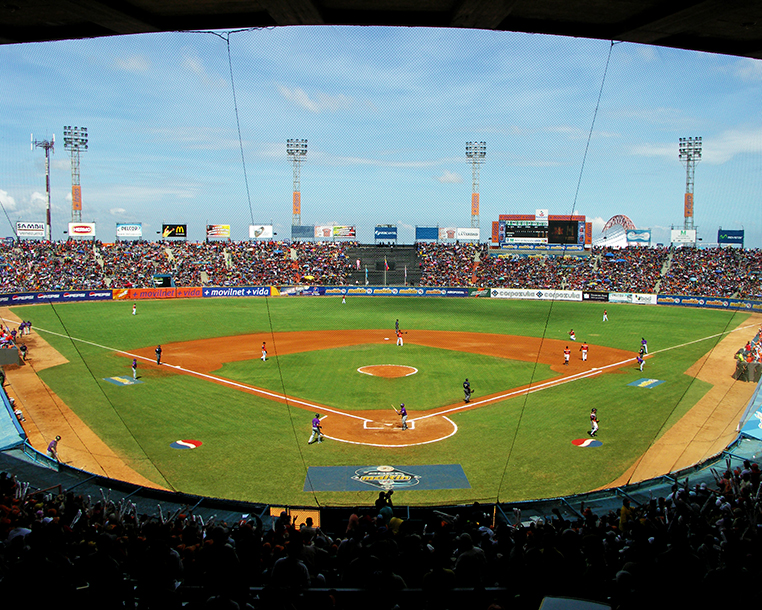
Luis Aparicio El Grande Stadium, Maracaibo, Zulia State

== Notable people ==
- Luis Aparicio (born 1934) – Baseball Hall of Fame MLB shortstop, 1956 AL Rookie of the Year; 13-time All-Star, 9-time Gold Glove winner.
- Rafael Urdaneta (1788–1845) – Hero of the Spanish American Wars of Independence and close ally of Simón Bolívar.
- Ricardo Montaner (born 1957) – Internationally successful Venezuelan-Argentinian singer-songwriter.
- Humberto Fernández Morán (1924–1999) – Renowned scientist, founder of IVIC; inventor of the diamond knife used in electron microscopy.
- Rafael María Baralt (1810–1860) – Diplomat, writer, philologist, and the first Latin American to become a member of the Royal Spanish Academy.
- L. Rafael Reif (born 1950) – Former President of MIT (2012–2022); Venezuelan-American engineer.
- Felipe Pirela (1941–1972) – Iconic bolero singer known as “El Bolerista de América.”
- Betulio González (born 1949) – Three-time world boxing champion in the flyweight category.
- Daniel Sarcos (born 1967) – Popular television host in Venezuela and internationally on Telemundo.
- Patricia Velásquez (born 1971) – International fashion model and actress (appeared in The Mummy films).
- Monica Spear (1984–2014) – Miss Venezuela 2004, Miss Universe 2005 4th runner-up, actress. Tragically killed in a robbery in 2014.
- Ulises Hadjis (born 1982) – Latin Grammy-nominated indie singer-songwriter.
- Javier Castellano (born 1977) – U.S.-based jockey, Eclipse Award winner four times in a row (2013–2016), Hall of Fame inductee.
- Luis Matos (born 2002), Major League Baseball outfielder for the San Francisco Giants.
- Juan Rincón (born 1979), former MLB relief pitcher, later served as a professional baseball coach.
- Ignacio Rodríguez Iturbe (1942–2022), hydrologist and professor, co-founder of ecohydrology and recipient of the Stockholm Water Prize in 2002.
- Gustavo Valderrama (born 1977), former Venezuelan volleyball player who represented Venezuela in international competitions, including the 2008 Beijing Olympics.

== Sports ==
=== Baseball ===
Zulia is home to the Águilas del Zulia, a team in the Venezuelan Professional Baseball League. They play at Luis Aparicio El Grande Stadium in Maracaibo and have held exhibition games at Víctor Davalillo Stadium in Cabimas since 2011. The Águilas are one of Venezuela's most popular and successful baseball teams.

=== Football (Soccer) ===
Football has grown in popularity in recent decades. Zulia Fútbol Club, active from 2005 to 2022, played in the Primera División and was based at Estadio José Encarnación "Pachencho" Romero. In 2022, the club merged with Deportivo Rayo Zuliano, which now represents the state in the top division. Other teams include Deportivo JBL del Zulia ( Segunda División), and historically Titanes F.C. and Zulia FC B.

=== Basketball ===
The state's top basketball team is Gaiteros del Zulia, four-time champions of the Venezuelan professional league (1984, 1985, 1996, 2001). They play at the Gimnasio Pedro Elías Belisario Aponte in Maracaibo.

== Transportation ==
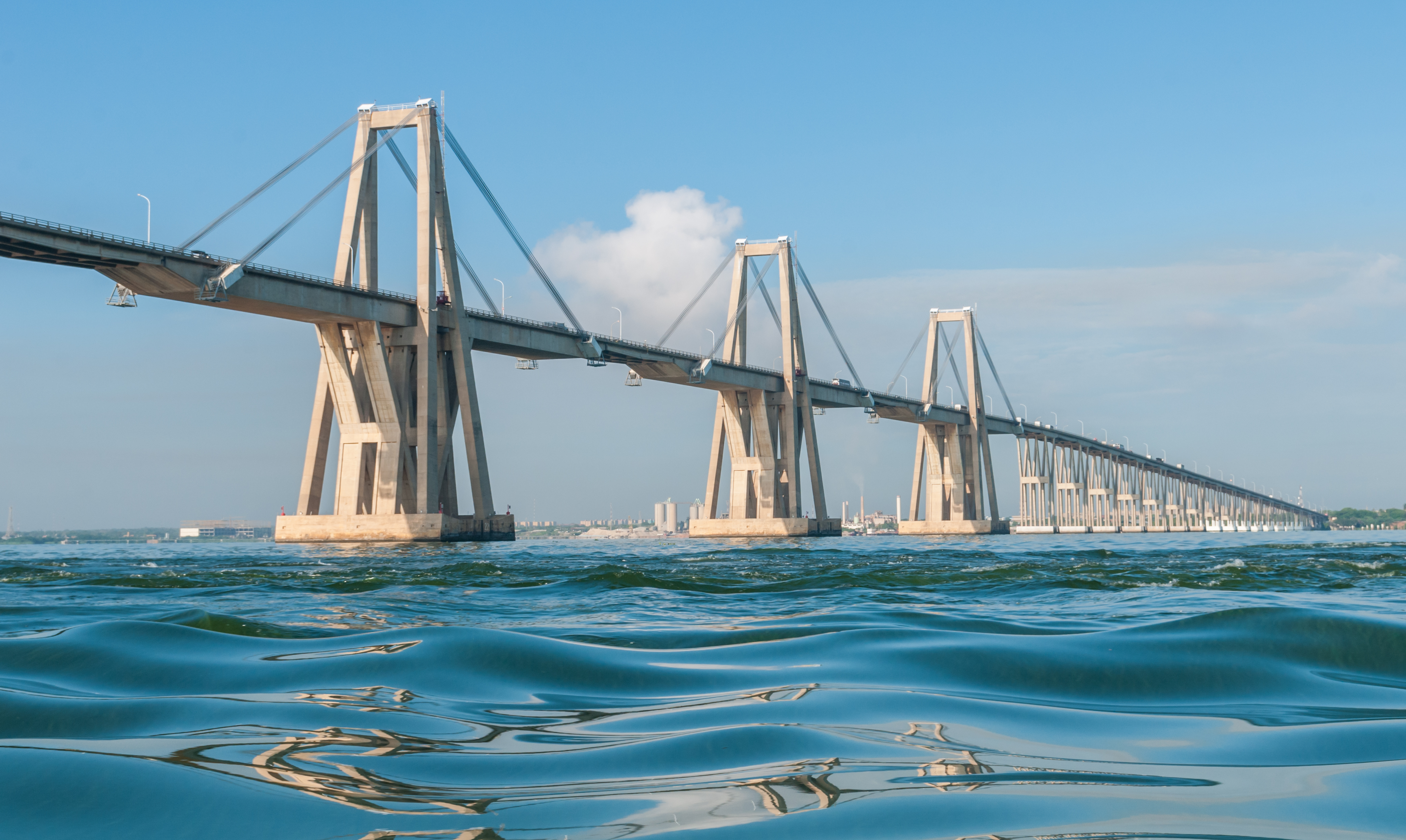
View of the General Rafael Urdaneta Bridge.

=== Roads and highways ===
Zulia has one of Venezuela's most extensive road networks, befitting its location in the country's west.

The main highways include:

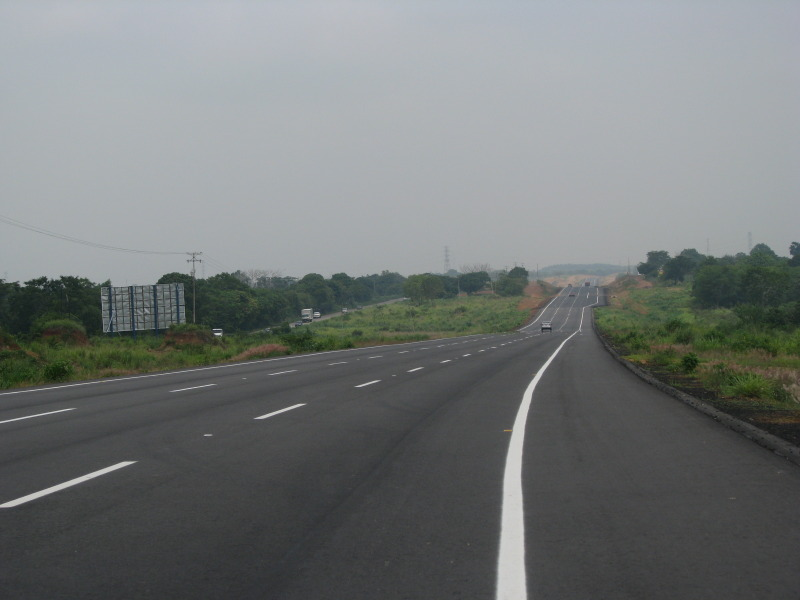
Lara Zulia Highway

- C1 (Highway 1)—Begins at the Distribuidor Las Delicias in Maracaibo and leads to the western head of the Rafael Urdaneta Bridge.
- Trunk 6—Runs from Castilletes through Maracaibo to the border with Táchira, serving the entire western region of the state.
- Trunk 17 (Lara-Zulia Highway)— Connects the eastern head of the Rafael Urdaneta Bridge with the state of Lara and the central-west of Venezuela.
- Trunk 3 (Falcon-Zulia Highway)—Links Zulia with Falcón and further into central Venezuela.
- Trunk 1 (Pan-American Highway)—Integrates the southern areas of Zulia with Mérida and Trujillo.
- Intercommunal Trunk—Serves the communities along the eastern shore of Lake Maracaibo.

=== Air transportation ===
The region's primary airport is La Chinita International Airport, located in San Francisco, part of Greater Maracaibo. It’s Venezuela's third-busiest airport, with over 1.5 million annual boardings. Domestic flights connect to Caracas, Valencia, Barquisimeto, Maturín, Ciudad Guayana, San Cristóbal, Porlamar, Mérida, and Puerto La Cruz. It also offers international routes across the Caribbean and to North, Central, and South America.

Other airports include Oro Negro Airport in Cabimas (Costa Oriental del Lago) and Miguel Urdaneta Fernández Airport in Santa Bárbara del Zulia (southern Lake region).

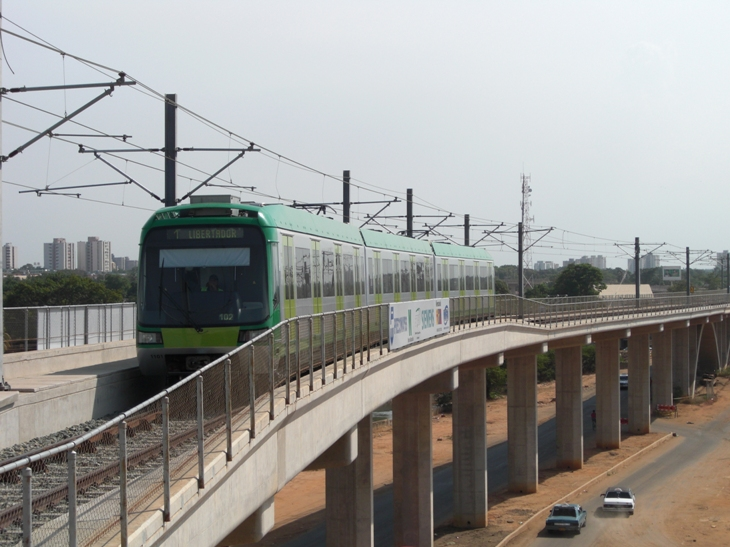
Metro de Maracaibo (Maracaibo subway)

=== Metro ===
The Maracaibo Metro is a multi-modal urban transit system combining surface, aerial, and underground lines. It opened for free pre-operational service on November 25, 2006, and began commercial operations on June 9, 2009. Network expansion is currently underway.

=== Aquatic transportation ===
Maracaibo hosts one of Venezuela's most important ports—a key colonial and modern hub. Zulia has 83 docking ports, including the major La Salina oil terminal and the El Tablazo petrochemical terminal.

== Media ==
The most important newspapers produced in the region are La Verdad and Panorama, both based in Maracaibo, with Panorama being one of the three main newspapers of national circulation. El Regional del Zulia, based in Ciudad Ojeda, is also among the most read in the state.

Zulia also has several local open signal television stations, including NCTV (Niños Cantores Televisión), Channel 11 VHF. Other stations include Televiza (Channel 7 VHF), Telecolor (Channel 41 UHF), Global TV (Channel 65 UHF), and Catatumbo Televisión (Channel 31 UHF). Cable stations include ATEL (Americana de Televisión) and Coquivacoa Televisión, all based in Maracaibo.

On the Eastern Coast of the Lake, there are stations such as Zuliana de Televisión (Channels 28 and 30 UHF), and cable channels like TV COL (Televisora de la Costa Oriental del Lago) and Ciudad TV. In the western zone of the Perijá region, there are several radio stations and cable operators, including Ganadera 88.1, Sierra 99.1, Momentos 107.3, Selecta 102.7, Oye 90.9, Fe y Alegría 105.5, Rosario 95.5, Multivisión (cable operator), and Imagen TV (cable channel).

== Culture ==
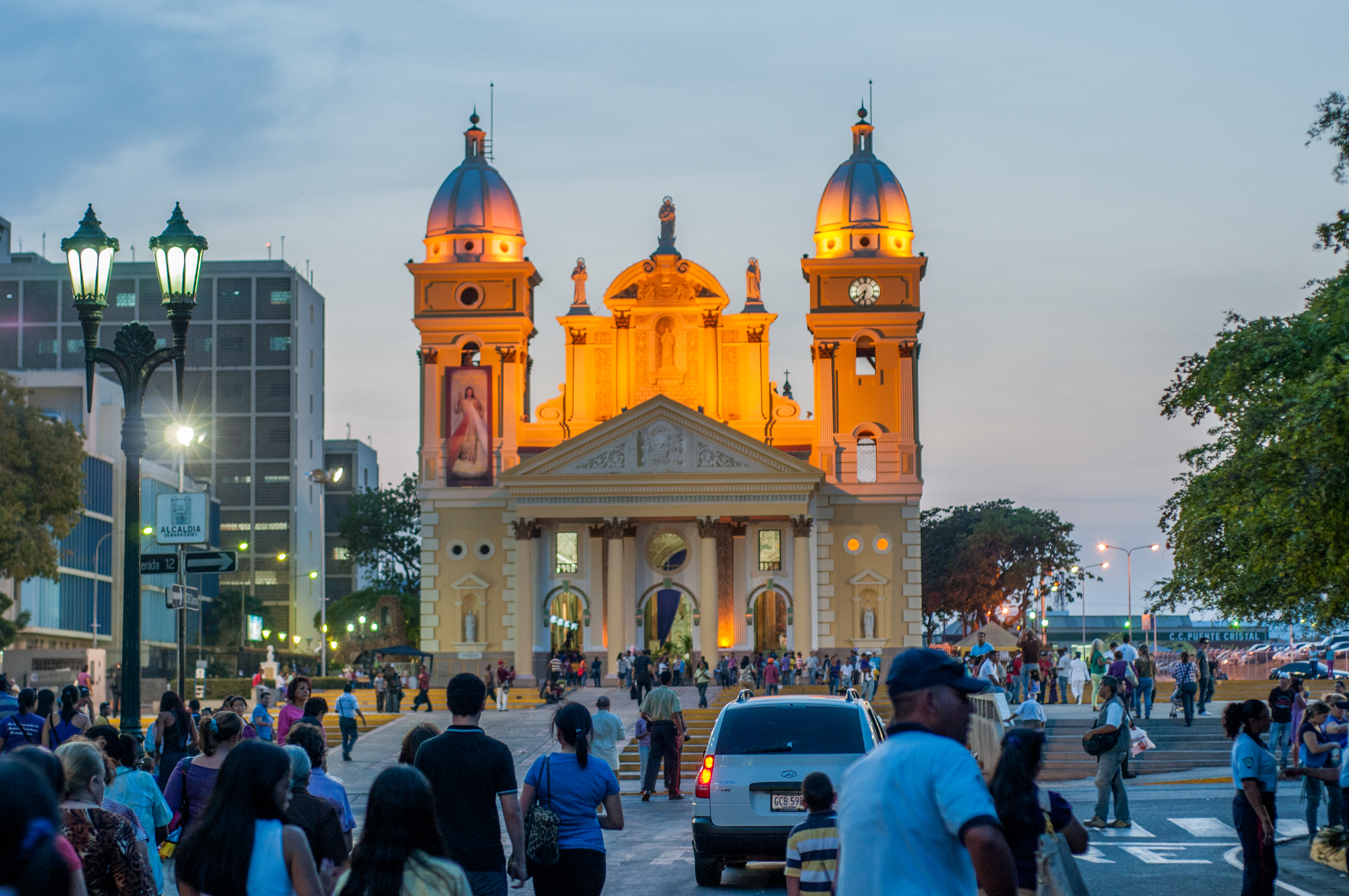
Minor Basilica of Our Lady of the Rosary of Chiquinquirá (La Chinita), Maracaibo

=== Religion ===
The majority of the population is Christian, a legacy of Spanish colonization). The largest church is the Catholic Church, with special devotion to the Virgin Mary under her title Our Lady of Chiquinquirá, whose annual feast is a major element of Zulian culture. The state's constitution guarantees freedom of worship, and multiple Protestant and other religious communities are present.

=== Languages ===
Spanish—particularly the local Marabino dialect—is the primary language. Indigenous languages persist, especially Wayuu language (the largest indigenous language in Zulia), mainly on the Guajira Peninsula.

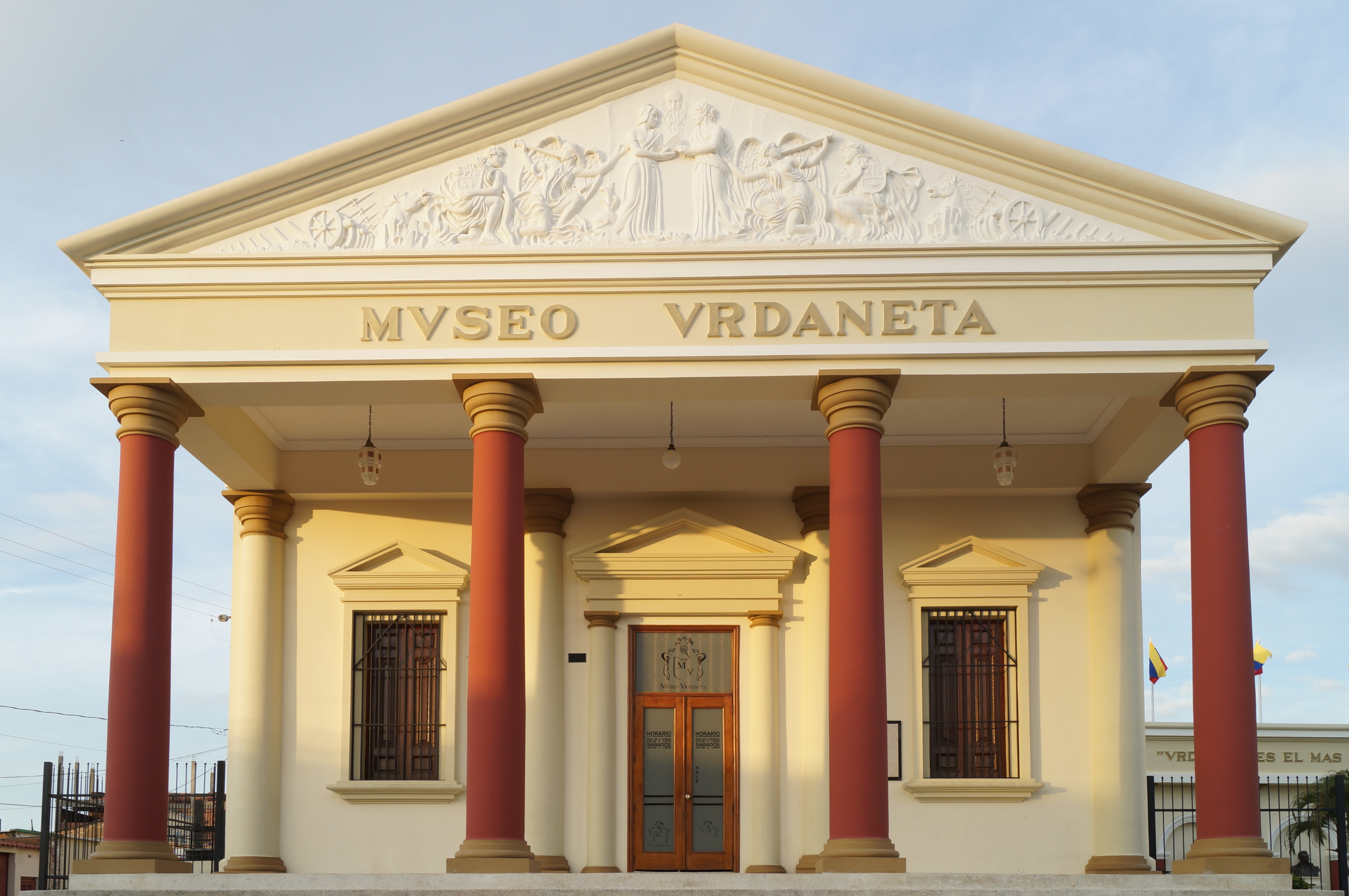
Urdaneta Museum

Other indigenous languages include Yukpa (~7,500 speakers), Bari (~8,000), and Japreria (~95), each endangered. Zulia is the only Venezuelan state where Voseo (use of "vos") is widespread. Both Spanish and indigenous languages are recognized by the state government, but Spanish predominates in official and public spheres.

=== Regional symbols ===
Zulia's symbols—its state hymn (1909), coat of arms (1917), and flag (1991)—are enshrined in the constitution, reinforcing the state's political and cultural identity.

=== Natural symbols ===
Nature symbols include:

- Coconut tree (Cocos nucifera)
- Chinese rose (Hibiscus rosa‑sinensis)
- Brown pelican (Pelecanus occidentalis), a local emblematic bird

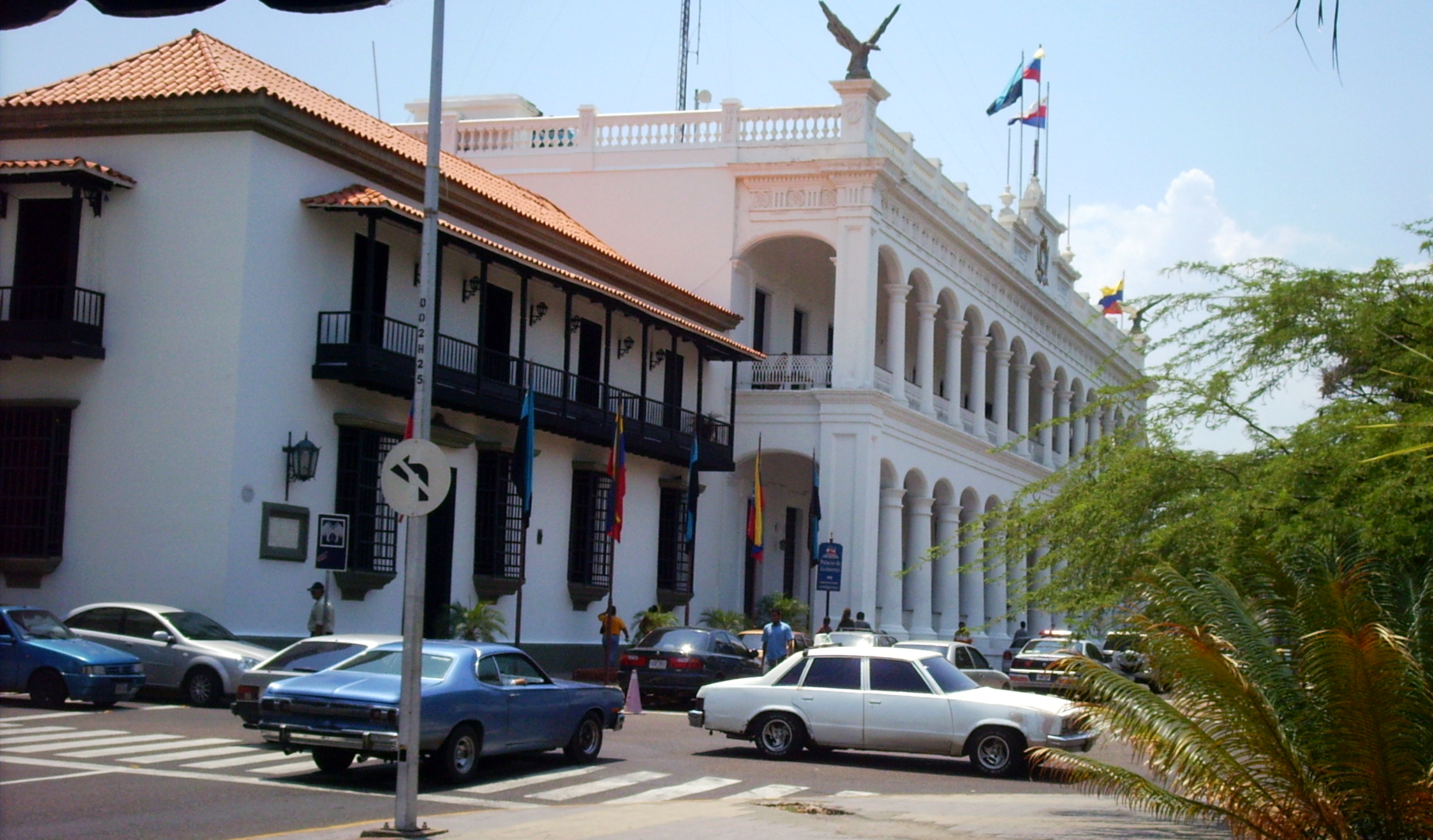
Palace of the Condors (Palacio de los Cóndores). Seat of the Executive Power of Zulia State since 1868
