= Sinamaica =

- Parish
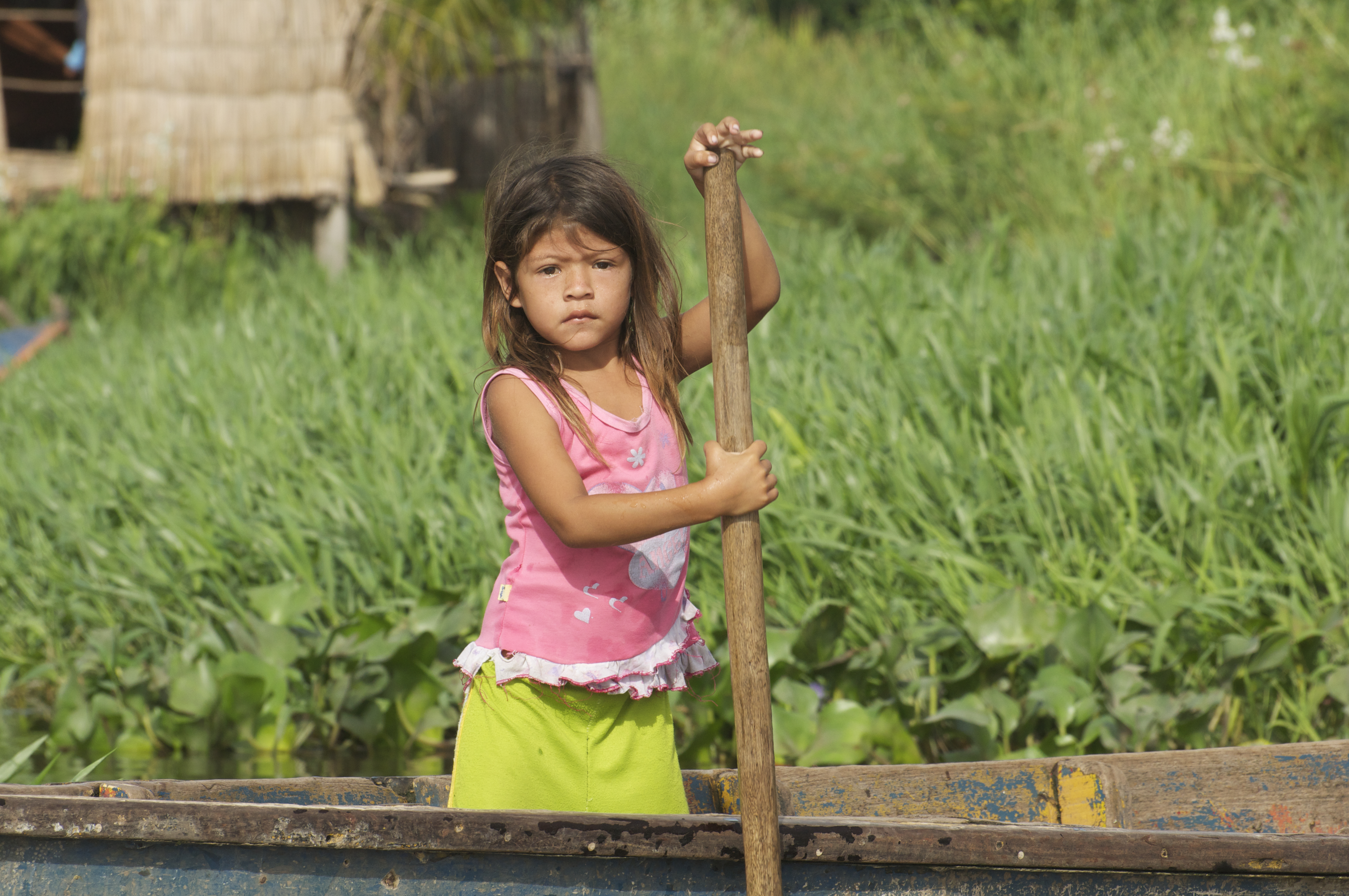
- Río Limón

- Location of the parish
- Coordinates: 11.0865°N 71.8544°W
- Country: Venezuela
- State: Zulia
- Municipality: Guajira

Area
  - Total: 311 km^{2} (120 sq mi)

Population (2023)
  - Total: 16,426
- Time zone: UTC−4 (VET)

Sinamaica is the seat of Guajira Municipality in Zulia State, Venezuela. It is a village of about 2,000 people.
