= Rosario de Perijá Municipality =

Rosario de Perijá Municipality Municipio Rosario de Perijá
- Municipality
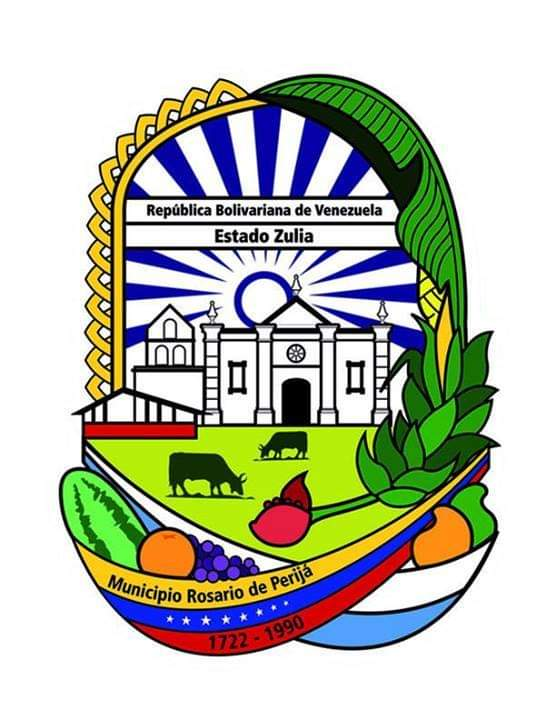
- Flag Coat of arms

- Location in Zulia

- Location in Venezuela
- Coordinates: 10°14′31″N 72°17′39″W
- Country: Venezuela
- State: Zulia
- Created: 1989
- Municipal seat: Villa del Rosario

Government
  - Mayor: Ely Ramón Atencio (AD)

Area
  - Total: 3,543 km^{2} (1,368 sq mi)

Population (2011 census)
  - Total: 85,006
  - Density: 23.99/km^{2} (62.14/sq mi)
- Time zone: UTC−4 (VET)

Rosario de Perijá Municipality (Spanish: Municipio Rosario de Perijá) is one of the 21 municipalities of Zulia, Venezuela, located west of Lake Maracaibo. It was created in 1989 and covers about 3,543 square kilometres (1,368 sq mi). At the 2011 census it had 85,006 inhabitants. Its seat is Villa del Rosario, whose founding dates to 1722, when the Spanish crown licensed Juan de Chourio to establish a town.

The municipality has three parishes: Donaldo García, El Rosario and Sixto Zambrano.

== Economy ==
The local economy is based mainly on cattle ranching, and the municipality is one of Venezuela's major livestock centers. Agriculture is also significant, and limestone has long been quarried for cement production.

== Population ==
Most of the population is of mixed descent. Indigenous Yukpa and Wayuu communities live in the western and northern parts of the municipality, along with a small Japrería community. For several decades there has been conflict between Indigenous communities and cattle ranchers over land use.

== Geography ==
=== Climate ===
Minimum monthly temperatures vary with elevation between 6.9 and 23.4 °C (44.4 and 74.1 °F), and maximum temperatures between 17.9 and 33.4 °C (64.2 and 92.1 °F). Annual precipitation ranges from 1,228 to 2,151 millimetres (48.3 to 84.7 in). Most rain falls between September and November, and the driest quarter runs from January to March.

=== Fauna and flora ===
The municipality lies in the Cordillera Oriental montane forests ecoregion, and its main natural habitat type is tropical and subtropical moist broadleaf forests.

Common birds include the great egret (Ardea alba), mealy amazon (Amazona farinosa), bicolored wren (Campylorhynchus griseus), brown-throated parakeet (Eupsittula pertinax), tropical kingbird (Tyrannus melancholicus) and Carib grackle (Quiscalus lugubris). Systematic surveys have recorded at least 28 species of dung beetles, including Canthon mutabilis, Canthidium lebasi, Onthophagus marginicollis, Dichotomius agenor, Coprophanaeus gamezi and Canthon lituratus.

== History ==
During the 2010 Colombia–Venezuela diplomatic crisis, the Colombian government presented evidence in July 2010 that FARC commander Iván Márquez ran a clandestine camp in the Sorotama area of Villa del Rosario, in the Serranía del Perijá. Venezuela responded by recalling its ambassador from Bogotá and accused Colombian President Álvaro Uribe of trying to sabotage relations between the two countries.

== Government ==
The current mayor is Ely Ramón Atencio, who was re-elected in July 2025 for the 2025–2029 term. He ran for Democratic Action and allied parties and won 59.90% of the vote.
