= Villa del Rosario, Venezuela =

Villa del Rosario
- Location within Venezuela
- Coordinates: 10°19′N 72°19′W
- Country: Venezuela
- State: Zulia
- Municipality: Rosario de Perijá Municipality

Population (2011)
  - Total: 65,907
- Time zone: UTC−4 (VET)

Rosario (Spanish pronunciation: [la ˈβiʝa ðel roˈsaɾjo]), or Villa del Rosario, is a town of Venezuela in the Zulia State. It is located about sixty miles southwest of Maracaibo, the State Capital. La Villa del Rosario is the capital of Rosario de Perijá Municipality. It has about 120.000 inhabitants (2007). Its economy is based on cattle-raising, agriculture and milk production. It is said that this municipality is the first milk producer in Venezuela.
