= Hydrography of Norte de Santander =

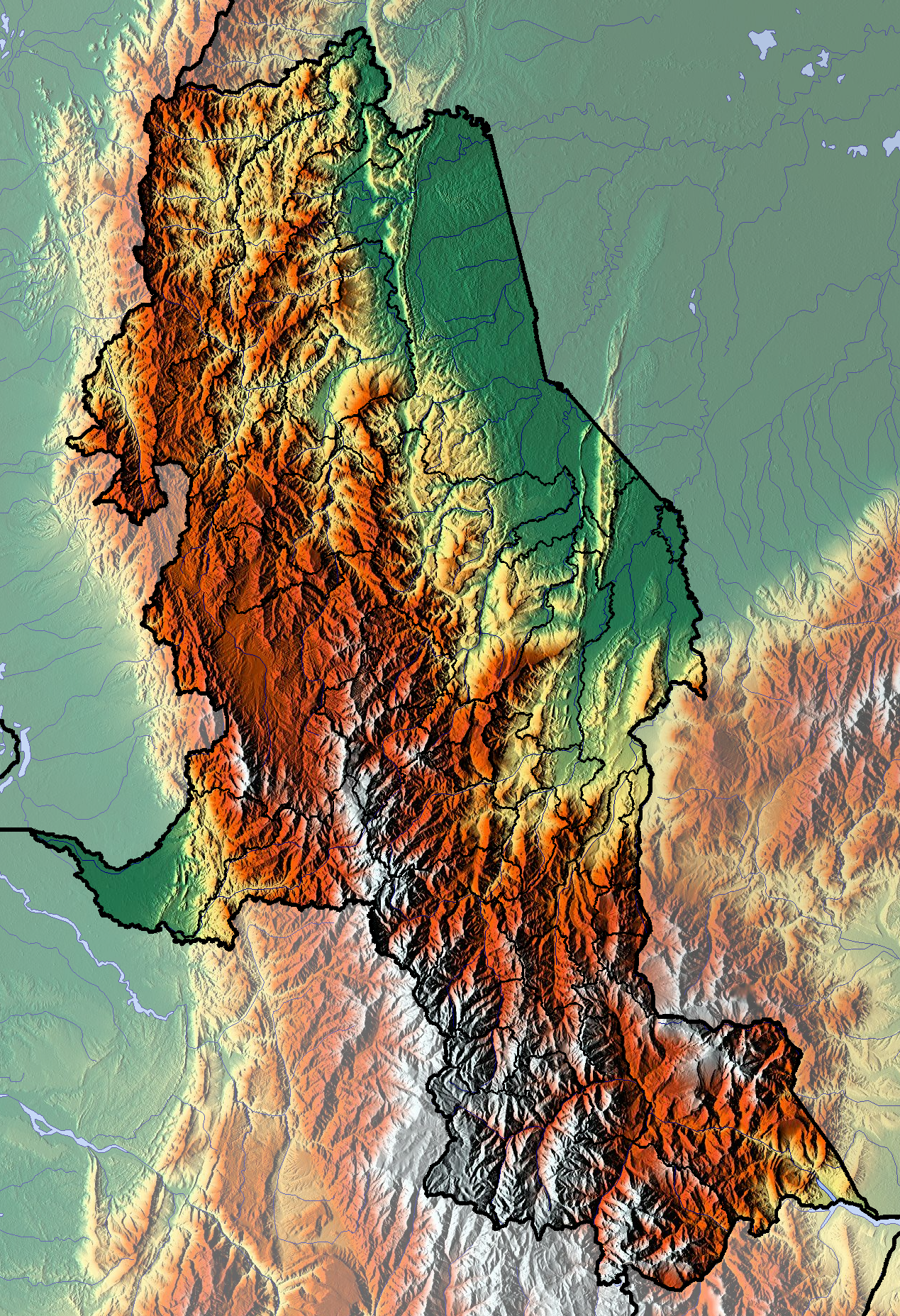
Topography of Norte de Santander

The hydrography of most of Norte de Santander is part of the Maracaibo Lake basin

The department of Norte de Santander in northwestern Colombia, and its capital, Cúcuta, contains several rivers. The rivers are mostly part of the Maracaibo Lake basin, with the southeastern section located in the Magdalena River basin. Important fluvial elements are the Zulia, Catatumbo and Pamplonita Rivers. The entity in charge of taking care of these hydrology of Norte de Santander is Corponor.

== Topography ==
The department of Norte de Santander is for the most part situated in the Eastern Ranges of the Colombian Andes. The northeastern majority of the department is part of the Maracaibo Lake drainage basin, while the southwestern tip of Norte de Santander forms part of the Magdalena River basin. The southeasternmost part of the department is located in the Orinoco River basin. The department, reaching to an altitude of 3,329 metres (10,922 ft) in the Tamá Páramo, has a total surface area of 22,367 square kilometres (8,636 sq mi).

== Hydrography ==
=== Catatumbo River ===
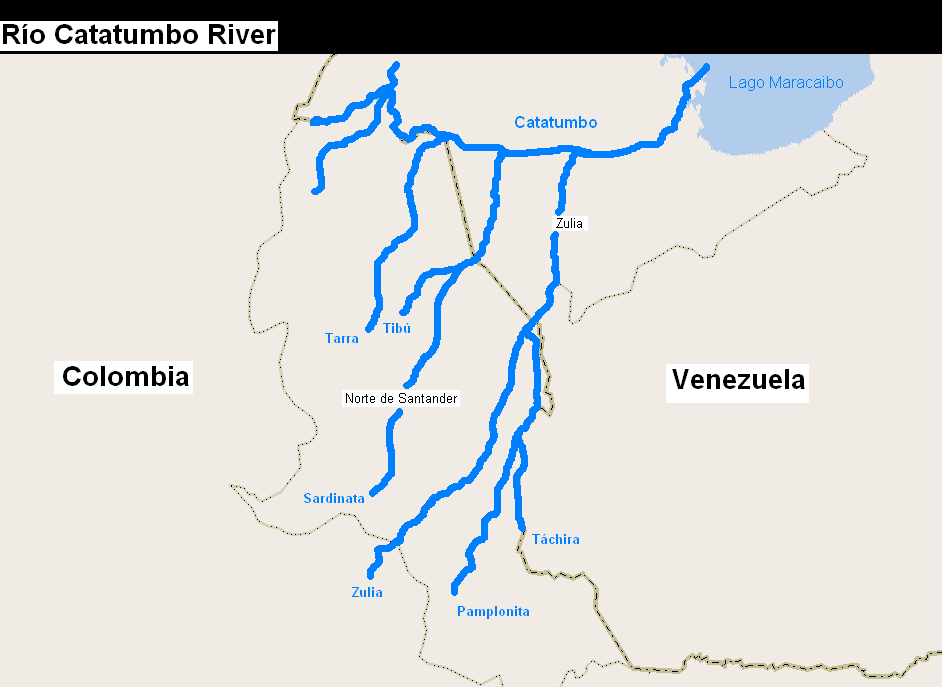
Catatumbo River basin in Norte de Santander and Venezuela, with main tributaries

The Catatumbo River is a fast flowing river, originating as the confluence of the Peralonso, Sardinata and Zulia Rivers in the central valley of Norte de Santander.

The upper part of the river is sourced from the highlands near the Macho Rucio Peak ("gray mule peak"), located in the south of Ocaña province. Its mouth is at Lake Maracaibo in Venezuela, through a delta called La Empalizada ("the fence"). Early sections of the Catatumbo River are known as Chorro Oroque, Rio de la Cruz, and Algodonal. Only in the Venezuelan section it is navigable.

Left tributaries of the Catatumbo River include:

Main affluents
Río Frío, Río de Oro, Erbura, Tiradera and San Miguelito
Minor affluents
Sajada, El Molino, San Lucas, Los Indios, Zurita, Carbón, Naranjito, Sánchez, Joaquín Santos, Teja, San Carlos, Guaduas, Águila, Lejía, Honda, Capitán Largo, Manuel Díaz, Oropora, Huevo, La Vieja, Guayabal, Guamos and Roja

Right tributaries include:

Main affluents
San Miguel, Tarra, Orú, Sardinata and Zulia
Minor affluents
La Urugmita, La Labranza, Seca, Cargamenta and San Calixto or Maravilla

==== Peralonso River ====
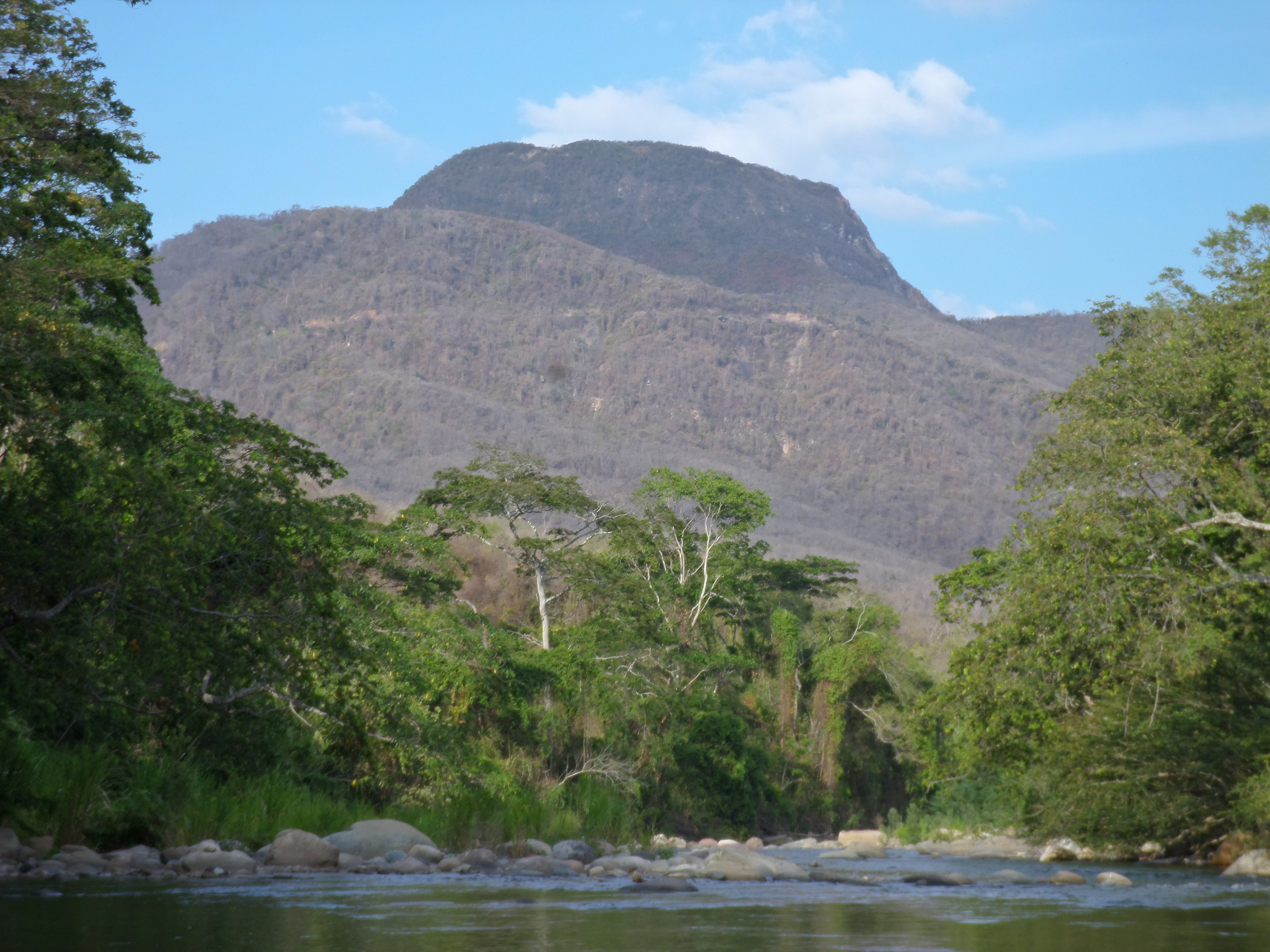
Alto de los Compadres, seen from the Peralonso River

The Peralonso River originates in a small lake in the Guerrero highlands, at 3,100 metres (10,200 ft) altitude. It crosses the municipalities of Salazar, Gramalote, Santiago, San Cayetano and Cúcuta, ending in the Zulia River, near the village of San Cayetano. It forms the upper course of the Catatumbo River.

==== Sardinata River ====
The Sardinata River originates in La Vuelta, in the Guerrero highlands, near the village of Caro at about 3,100 metres (10,200 ft) above sea level. It has a length of almost 17 kilometres (11 mi). Near the river, many forestal and mining activities are present. Its affluents are on the left tributary Santa and the right tributaries Riecito San Miguel, La Sapa, José, La Esmeralda, La Resaca and Pedro José. Its Colombian segment ends in Tres Bocas and continues in Venezuela terminating in the Catatumbo River.

=== Zulia River ===
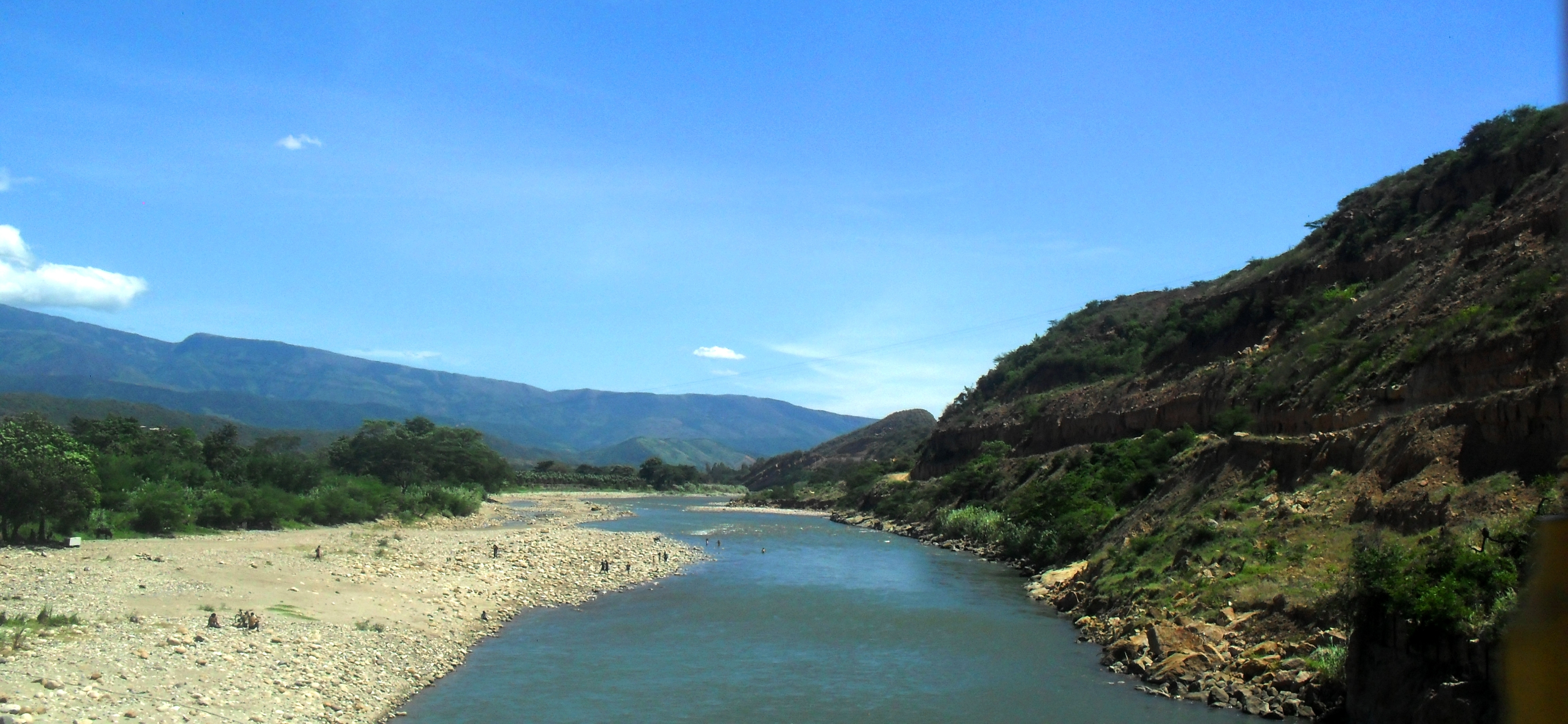
Zulia River

The Zulia River is formed by several rivers originating in lakes in the highlands of Cachiri at about 4,220 meters above sea level, and located between 12°41'2" east longitude and 8’9" north latitude in the Santander Department, in the eastern range of the Andes mountains. The river flows through the province of Cúcuta, passing through the neighbouring nation of Venezuela, and ends in the waters of Lake Maracaibo.

In Colombian territory, this river is navigable for about 70 kilometres (43 mi), starting from the old port of Los Canchos. The river flows for 260 kilometres (160 mi) through Venezuela, the last 80 kilometres (50 mi) being deep and calm, adaptable to embarkments of big proportions.

In the past, this river provided a basic means of transportation which was responsible for much of prosperity of the neighbouring valleys, like the center of nutritioned commerce, whose products fed many of the towns nearby. The Zulia river's tributaries include the Cucutilla, Arboleda, Salazar and the Peralonso Rivers, which flow from the left, and the Pamplonita River with its own tributaries the Táchira and La Grita Rivers, flowing from the right.

Areas surrounding the Zulia River are fertile, with many forests decorating the landscape. However, the climate of this area could be seen as unhealthy, due to the density of trees and the many swamps.

==== Salazar River ====
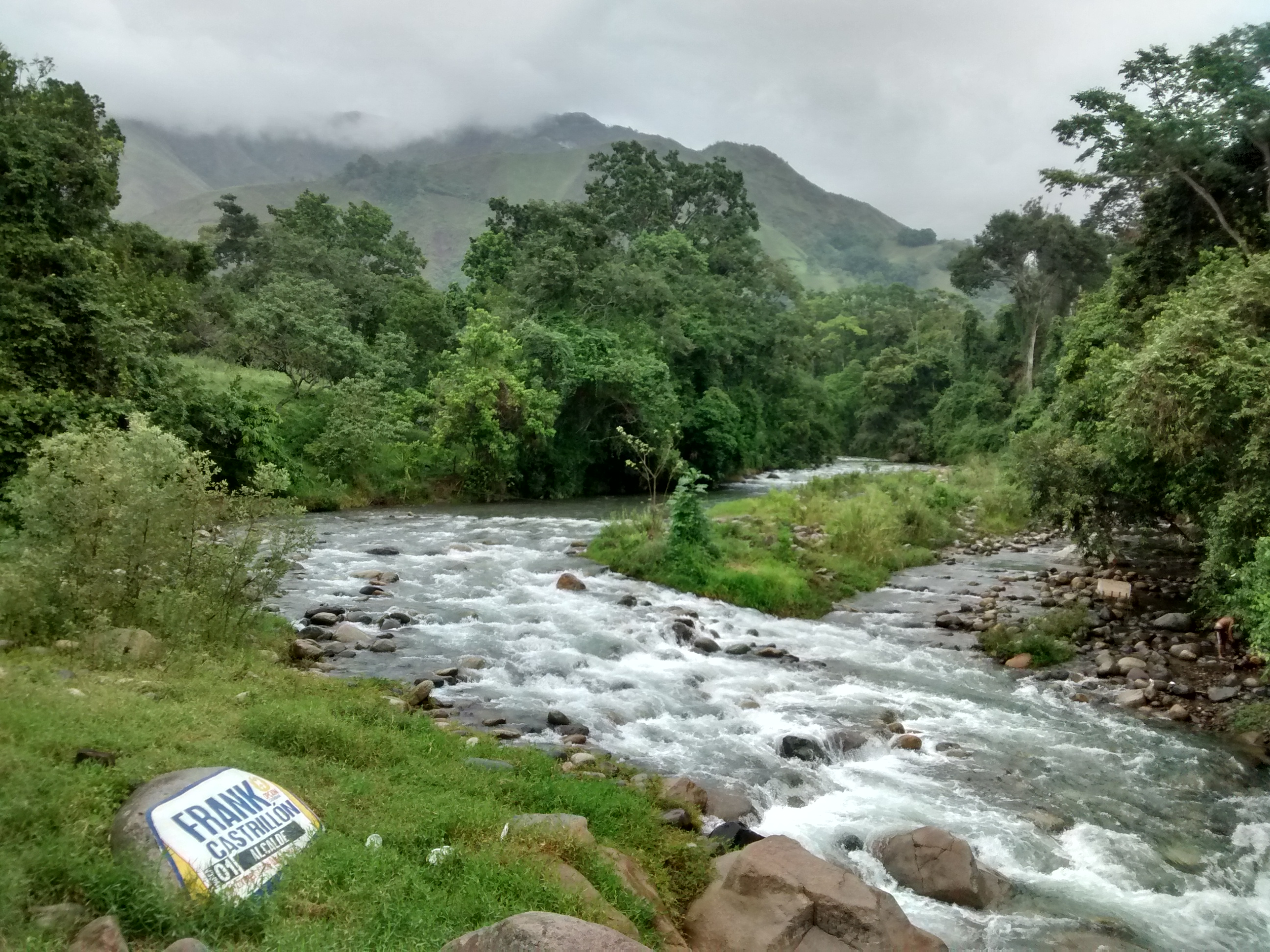
Salazar River

The Salazar River originates near the city of Zulia and terminates near the namesake town of Salazar de las Palmas. It's an important river in the tradition of local inhabitants. It is used for swimming, fishing and cooking the traditional sancocho soup on the beaches of the river. There are some areas of the river near Salazar city that have waterfalls of many minor water streams falling into the river, that are often visited by tourists.

==== La Grita River ====
La Grita River originates in the Venezuelan Andes near the town of La Grita at about 3,000 metres (9,800 ft) above sea level. It's a natural boundary between Colombia and Venezuela for about 5 kilometres (3.1 mi), until its mouth in the Zulia River. Its affluents are the Guaramito River, La China, Riecito, Río Lobatera, and Caño de La Miel.

=== Pamplonita River ===
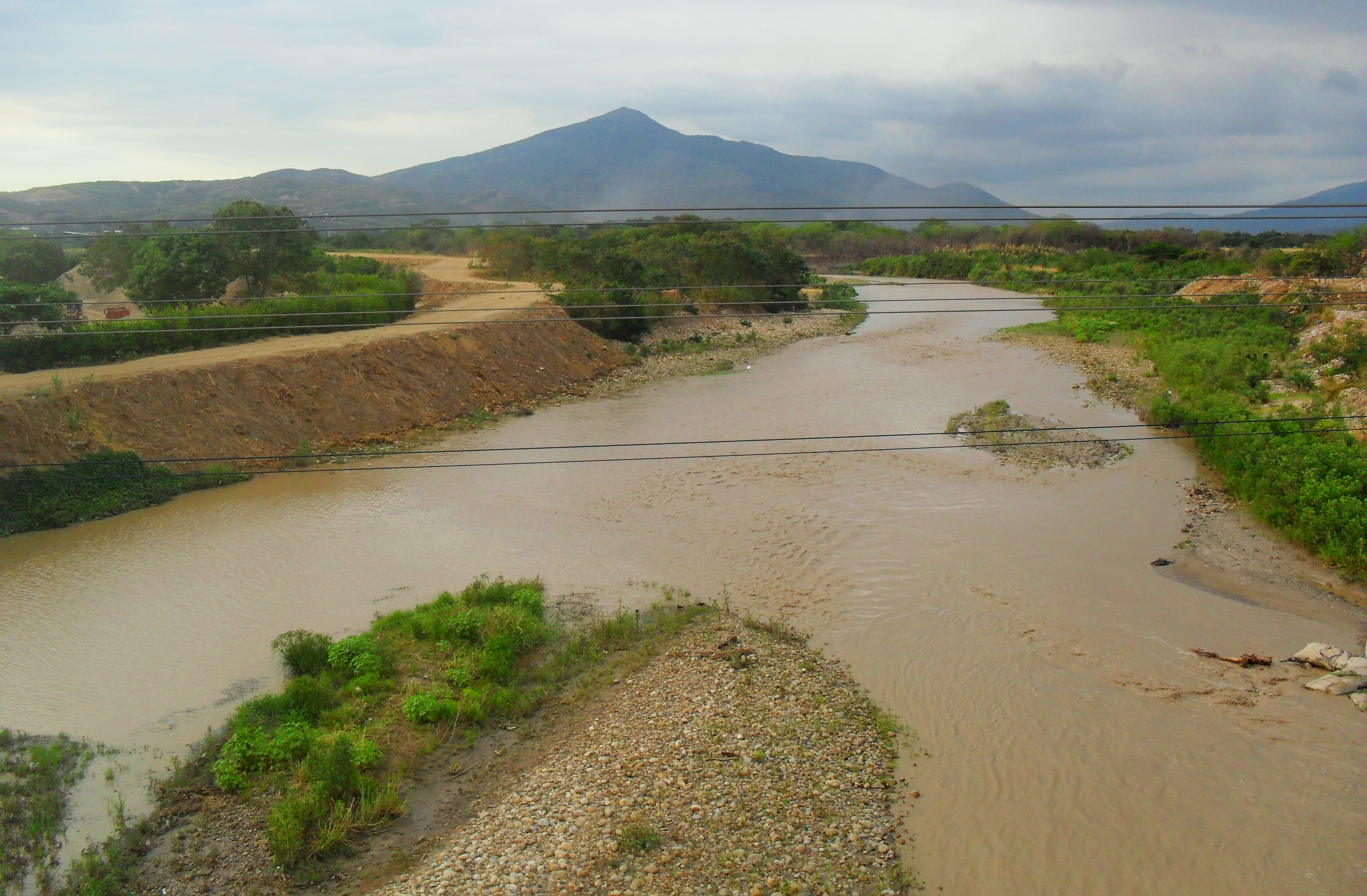
Pamplonita River in Cúcuta

The Pamplonita River was of crucial importance in the economy of the country in the 18th to 19th centuries as the main channel for the transportation of cacao.

It originates in the Altogrande Mountains at 3,000 metres (9,800 ft) above sea level, near the city of Pamplona. It flows downhill through the Cariongo Valley, and near Chinácota the confluence with the minor affluent Honda River is situated. The Pamplonita River flows through the Cúcuta valley, where it has a slow flow, ending in the Zulia River, flowing towards Maracaibo Lake. Most of this river is above 150 metres (490 ft) above sea level. The total length of the river is about 115 kilometres (71 mi) and its watershed covers 137,524 hectares (339,830 acres).

The confluence of the Pamplonita and Zulia Rivers is located near the urban area of Cúcuta, the capital of Norte de Santander, in particular the Rinconada neighborhood. This part contains the risk of flooding, until in the streets of the city. The river has periodically flooded the local hospital and the Colón Park, named after Cristóbal Colón. The river also produces a significant erosion in the surrounding lands, in part because of the local dry climate and shortage of vegetation. This is seen more noticeably in the areas near Cúcuta; La Garita and Los Vados.

The Pamplonita River crosses the municipalities of: Cúcuta, Pamplona, Los Patios, Chinácota, Bochalema and Pamplonita, and the villages of El Diamante, La Donjuana, La Garita, San Faustino and Agua Clara.

The river receives sewage water from Pamplona, Los Patios and Cúcuta, and residues from slaughterhouses, pesticides and fertilizers. The 1541 law regulates the use of water from the rivers to concessions regulated by the local government, but there are many illegal non-regulated diversions of water.

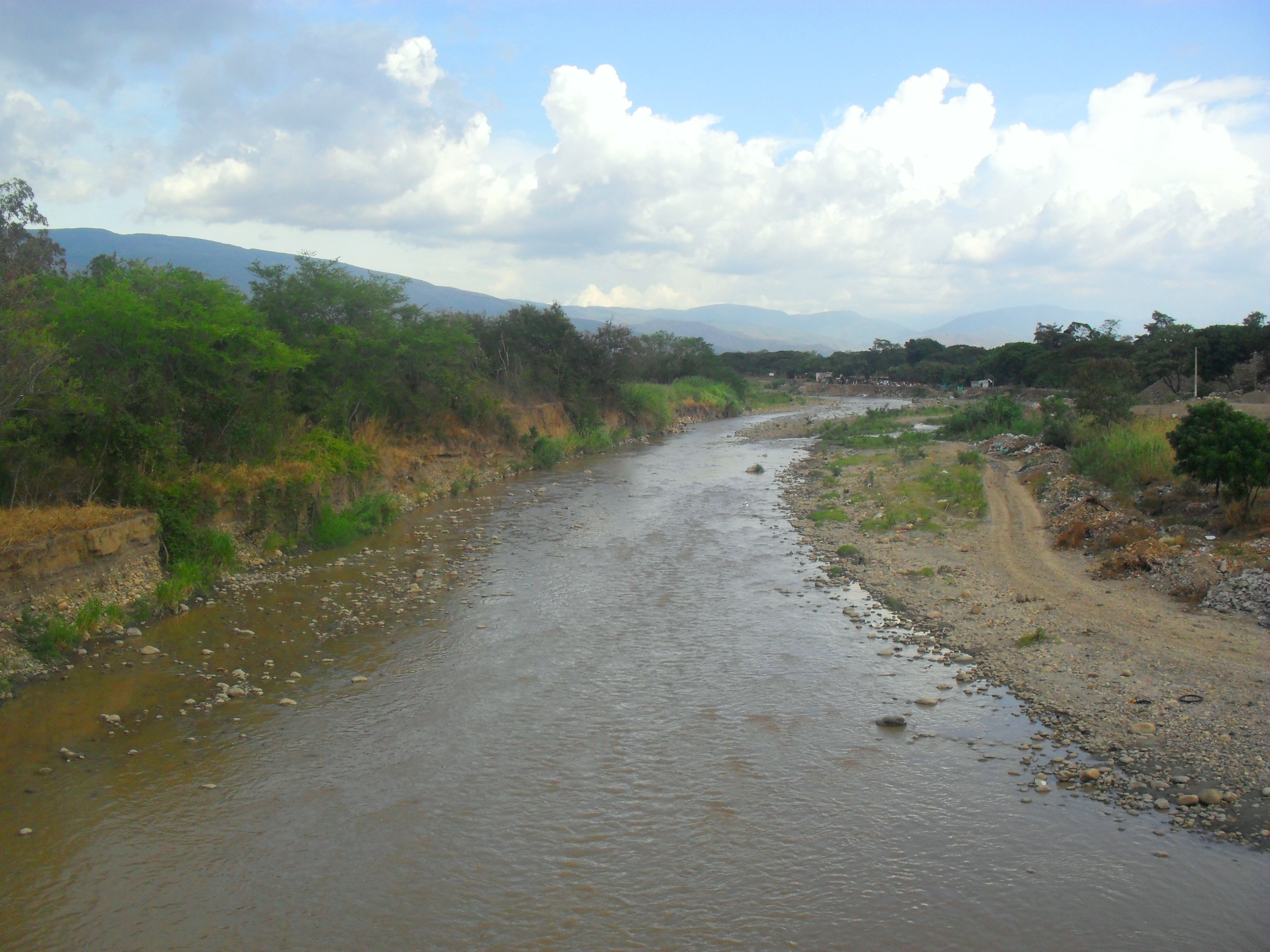
Táchira River, forming the border between Colombia and Venezuela

Affluents of Pamplonita River are:

Right

Main affluents: Táchira River, Rio Viejo, Las Brujas, Caño Cachicana and Caño Guardo
Minor affluents: Monteadentro, Los Negros, Los Cerezos, Zipachá, Tanauca, Ulagá, El Gabro, El Ganso, Santa Helena, Cucalina, La Teja, De Piedra, La Palmita, Matagira, La Chorrera, Iscalá, Honda, Cascarena, Villa Felisa, Ciénaga, Juana Paula, Don Pedra, Faustinera, Europea, Rodea, Aguasucia

Left

Minor affluents: Navarro, San Antonio, La Palma, Hojancha, La Laguna, Batagá, Galindo, Santa Lucía, Las Colonias, El Laurel, Chiracoca, Montuosa, El Masato, Quebraditas, Aguanegra, Zorzana, El Ojito, Jaguala, Viajaguala, Tío José, El Magro, Aguadas, La Rinconada, Periquera, Voladora, La Sarrera, La Cuguera, Guaimaraca, Aguaclarera, La Trigrera, Negro, El Oso, and Chipo

==== Táchira River ====
Táchica River basin map

The Táchira River originates near Tamá, in the mountains of Las Banderas, at an altitude of 3,368 metres (11,050 ft) above sea level. The river flows towards the north, as a natural boundary between Colombia and Venezuela. It crosses the municipalities of Herrán, Ragonvalia, Villa del Rosario and Cúcuta. Tachira River flows into the Pamplonita River near the village El Escobal.

Its affluents are El Salado, La Margarita, El Naranjal, Palogordo, El Palito, Agua Sucia and la Horma.

== See also ==
- List of rivers of Colombia
