= Ancistrus martini =

Conservation status
- Least Concern (IUCN 3.1)

Scientific classification
- Kingdom: Animalia
- Phylum: Chordata
- Class: Actinopterygii
- Order: Siluriformes
- Family: Loricariidae
- Genus: Ancistrus
- Species: A. martini

Binomial name
- Ancistrus martini Schultz, 1944

Synonyms
- Ancistrus triradiatus martini Schultz, 1944; Ancistrus brevifilis bodenhameri Schultz, 1944; Ancistrus bodenhameri Schultz, 1944

Species of catfish

Ancistrus martini is a species of freshwater ray-finned fish belonging to the family Loricariidae, the suckermouth armoured catfishes, and the subfamily Hypostominae, the suckermouth catfishes. This catfish is found in Colombia and Venezuela.

== Taxonomy ==
Ancistrus martini was first formally described in 1944 by the American ichthyologist Leonard Peter Schultz, with its type locality given as the Táchira River, 7 km (4.3 mi) north of San Antonio, in the Catatumbo River system in Venezuela. Eschmeyer's Catalog of Fishes classified the genus Ancistrus in the subfamily Hypostominae, the suckermouth catfishes, within the suckermouth armored catfish family Loricariidae. It has also been classified in the tribe Ancistrini by some authorities.

== Etymology ==
Ancistrus martini is classified in the genus Ancistrus, a name coined by Rudolf Kner, but when he proposed the genus he did not explain the etymology of the name. It is thought to be from the Greek ágkistron, meaning a "fish hook" or the "hook of a spindle", a reference to the hooked odontodes on the interopercular bone. The specific name, martini, honours the geologist Bethea Martin of the Lago Petroleum Corporation, who assisted Schultz when he collected fishes in Venezuela.

== Description ==
Ancistrus martini reaches a standard length of 8.9 cm (3.5 in). Ancistrus species develop soft, bushy tentacles on the snout when sexually mature, these are better developed in the males than they are in females.

== Distribution ==
Ancistrus martini has a wide distribution in the upper reaches of the rivers in the Sierra de Perija and in the Merida mountain range of the Maracaibo Basin, in north-western Venezuela. It has also been reported from the Colombian Caribbean. This species is found in streams with clear water, a stony bottom and where it grazes on periphyton growing on the stones.
