= Maracaibo dry forests =

Ecoregion surrounding Lake Maracaibo, Venezuela

Maracaibo dry forests (NT0222)
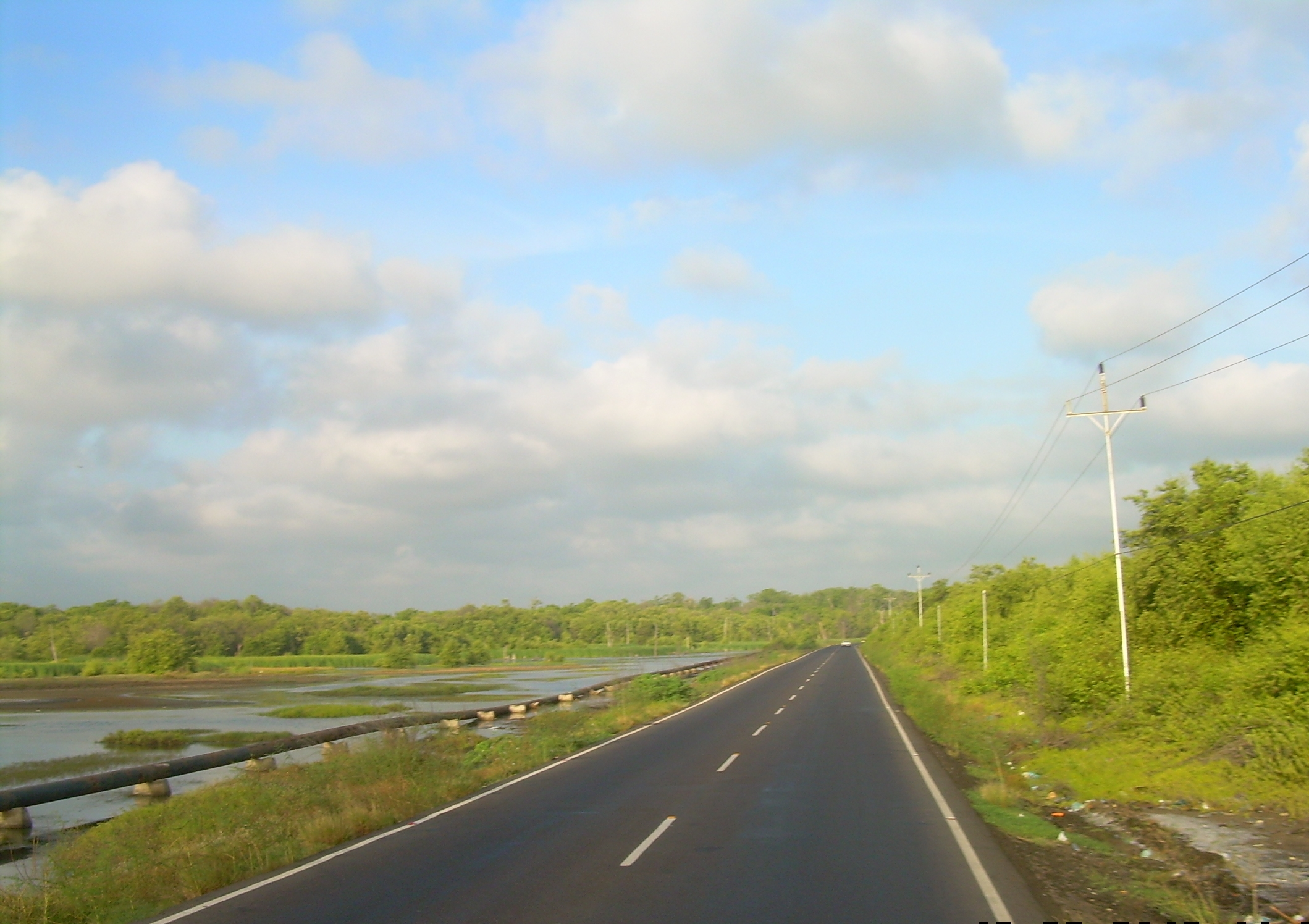
- Landscape in Zulia state

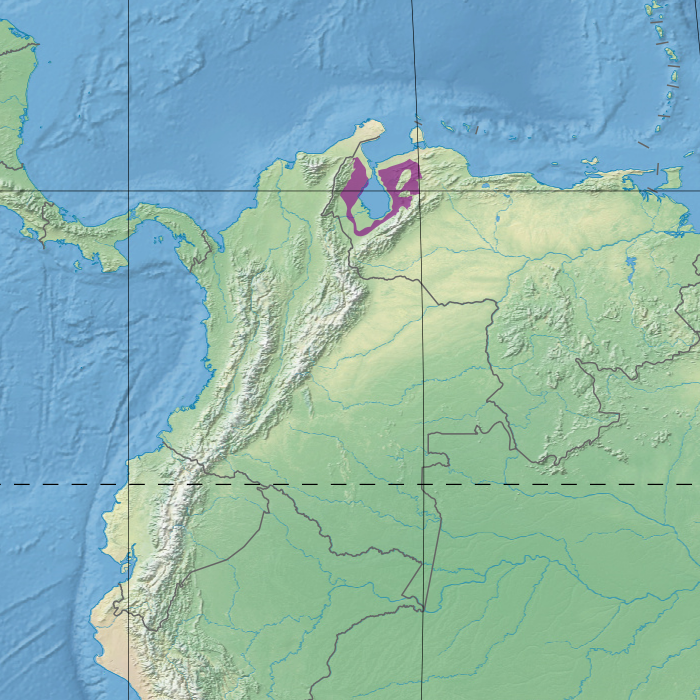
- Ecoregion territory (in purple)

Ecology
- Realm: Neotropical
- Biome: Tropical and subtropical dry broadleaf forests

Geography
- Area: 45,066 km^{2} (17,400 sq mi)
- Countries: Venezuela
- Coordinates: 10.425°N 71.078°W
- Climate type: Aw: equatorial, winter dry

The Maracaibo dry forests (NT0222) is an ecoregion in Venezuela around Lake Maracaibo. It contains the country's main oil fields. The habitat is criss-crossed by roads and is severely degraded by farming and livestock grazing.

== Geography ==
=== Location ===
The Maracaibo dry forests surround Lake Maracaibo in northwest Venezuela. The ecoregion has an area of 4,506,579 hectares (11,136,000 acres). Most of the ecoregion is in Zulia state, with some in Trujillo state.

In many areas the lake is fringed with Amazon–Orinoco–Southern Caribbean mangroves. To the north of the lake the western part of the ecoregion merges into Guajira–Barranquilla xeric scrub, while the eastern part merges into Paraguana xeric scrub to the north and east. To the southeast the dry forests are replaced by Venezuelan Andes montane forests. The ecoregion is bounded by the Catatumbo moist forests to the south and southwest, and Cordillera Oriental montane forests to the west. There are large patches of Catatumbo moist forests on high land within the Maracaibo dry forests.

=== Terrain ===
The Maracaibo dry forests are in the coluvio-alluvial coastal plains around Lake Maracaibo, bordering the Serranía del Perijá to the west, the Cordillera de Mérida to the south and the Sierra de Baragua to the northeast. The terrain of the ecoregion is flat and gives way to transitional moist forests higher in the mountains. Elevations are 0 to 500 metres (0 to 1,640 ft) above sea level. Several rivers flow from the surrounding mountains through the ecoregion to Lake Maracaibo. They include the Palmar, Negro, Lora and Catatumbo rivers from the Serranía del Perijá, the Escalante River from the Venezuelan Andes and the Motatán, Misoa and Pachango rivers in the east of the basin.

=== Climate ===
Annual temperatures are from 16 to 26 °C (61 to 79 °F). Less than 1,000 millimetres (39 in) of rain falls annually, with pronounced dry and wet seasons. At a sample location at coordinates 10.25°N 71.25°W the Köppen climate classification is "Aw": equatorial, winter dry. At this location the temperature is fairly constant throughout the year, ranging from an average mean of 27 °C (81 °F) in January to 28.5 °C (83.3 °F) in August. Total yearly rainfall is around 840 millimetres (33 in). Rainfall varies from 5.3 millimetres (0.21 in) in January to 113.2 millimetres (4.46 in) in May, drops to 68 millimetres (2.7 in) in July then rises again to 166.1 millimetres (6.54 in) in October.

== Ecology ==
The ecoregion is in the neotropical realm, in the tropical and subtropical dry broadleaf forests biome.

=== Flora ===
Most of the natural dry forest flora have been destroyed apart from small isolated patches of treed savanna and deciduous forest. Species in the savanna include Axonopus canascens, Bowdichia virgilioides, Spermacoce species, Byrsonima crassifolia, Bulbostylis capillaris, Curatella americana, Copernicia tectorum, Galactia jussieuana and Xylopia aromatica. There are very small fragments of deciduous dry forest to the west of the lake with species such as Acacia glamerosa, Bulnesia arborea, Bourreria cumanensis, Copaifera venezuelana, Gyrocarpus americanus, Jacquinia pungens, Malpighia glabra, Myrospermum frutescens, Piptadenia flava and Stenocereus griseus. Secondary growth in abandoned areas includes Cecropia species, Jacaranda copaia and Xylopia aromatica.

=== Fauna ===
Endemic terrestrial mammals found in this and other dry forest ecoregions in Colombia and Venezuela include the Guajira mouse opossum (Marmosa xerophila) and Hummelinck's vesper mouse (Calomys hummelincki). Endangered mammals include Geoffroy's spider monkey (Ateles geoffroyi). Endemic birds include the pygmy palm swift (Tachornis furcata), buffy hummingbird (Leucippus fallax), chestnut piculet (Picumnus cinnamomeus), white-whiskered spinetail (Synallaxis candei), black-backed antshrike (Thamnophilus melanonotus), slender-billed inezia (Inezia tenuirostris), Tocuyo sparrow (Arremonops tocuyensis) and vermilion cardinal (Cardinalis phoeniceus). Endangered birds include recurve-billed bushbird (Clytoctantes alixii) and plain-flanked rail (Rallus wetmorei).

== Status ==
The World Wildlife Fund gives the ecoregion the status of "Critical/Endangered". As with other neotropical dry forests the habitat has been severely damaged by livestock and agriculture and is at risk of complete destruction. The ecoregion is cut up by a large network of roads, including the Pan-American Highway. It contains the Bolivar Coastal Field on the northeastern shore of the lake. The oil fields in and around the lake produce most of Venezuela's oil. Some of the rivers are polluted with pesticides and fertilizers

== Sources ==
- Locklin, Claudia, South America: Northwestern corner of Venezuela (NT0222), WWF: World Wildlife Fund
- "Maracaibo dry forests", Global Species, Myers Enterprises II
- WildFinder, WWF: World Wildlife Fund
