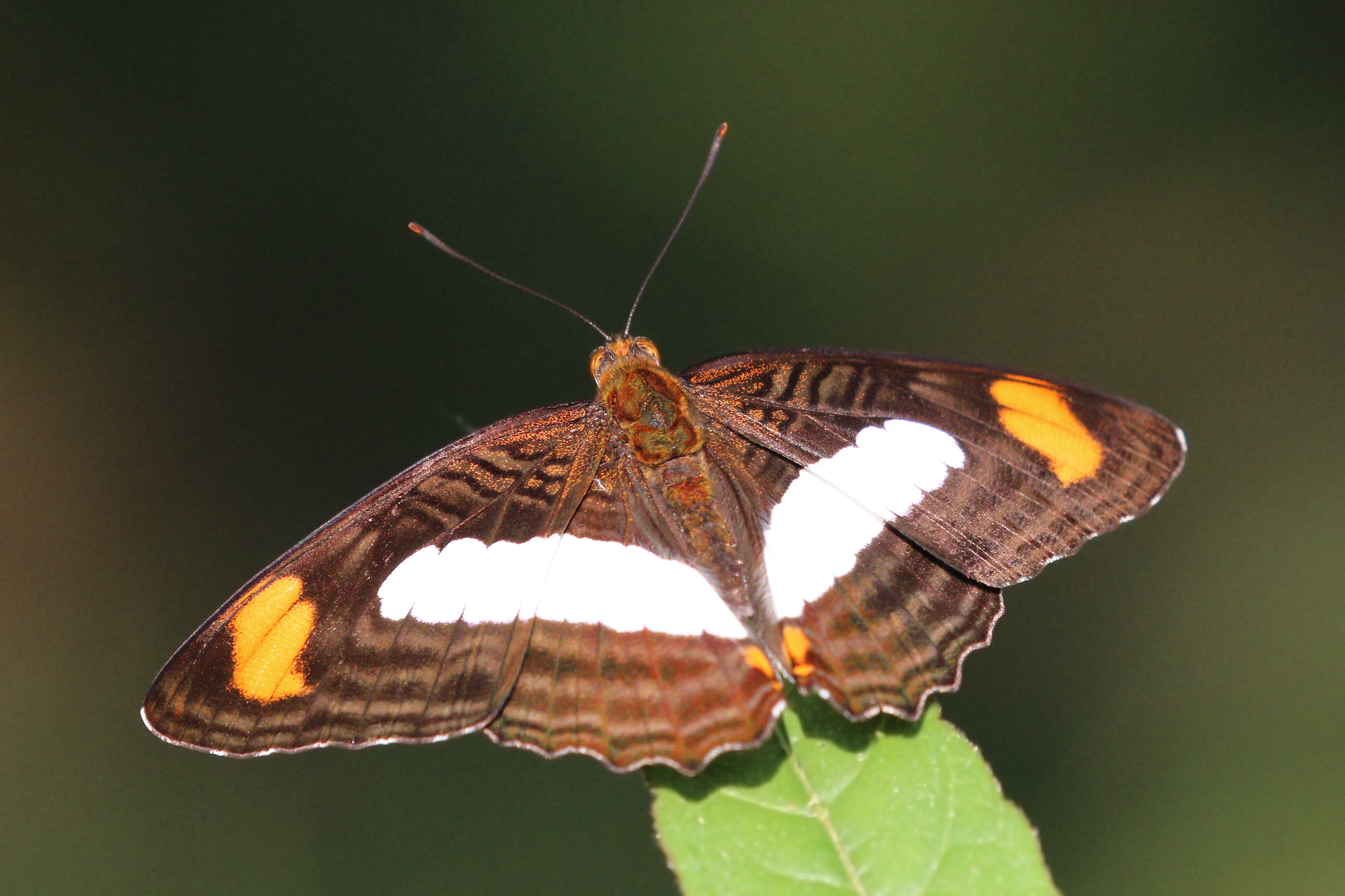
- A. i. iphiclus Cristalino River; Southern Amazon, Brazil

Scientific classification
- Kingdom: Animalia
- Phylum: Arthropoda
- Class: Insecta
- Order: Lepidoptera
- Family: Nymphalidae
- Genus: Adelpha
- Species: A. iphiclus

Binomial name
- Adelpha iphiclus (Linnaeus, 1758)

Synonyms
- Papilio iphiclus Linnaeus, 1758; Papilio basilea Cramer, [1777]; Adelpha basilis Hübner, [1819]; Adelpha iphicla pharaë Fruhstorfer, 1915; Adelpha iphicla exanima Fruhstorfer, 1915; Adelpha iphicla funalis Fruhstorfer, 1915; Heterochroa iphiclus ephesa Ménétriés, 1857; Heterochroa ephesa Ménétriés, 1855; Adelpha iphicla gellia Fruhstorfer, 1915; Adelpha abyla abylina Fruhstorfer, 1915; Adelpha iphiclus estrecha Willmott & Hall, 1999

= Adelpha iphiclus =

Iphiclus sister

Species of butterfly

Adelpha iphiclus, the Iphiclus sister, is a butterfly of the family Nymphalidae. It was described by Carl Linnaeus in his 1758 10th edition of Systema Naturae. It is found in the tropics and sub-tropics of Central and South America, from Mexico to Bolivia. The habitat consists of disturbed areas in deciduous and evergreen forests at altitudes ranging from 0 to 1,200 meters.

The wingspan is about 47 mm. Adult males engage in mud-puddling. Adults of both sexes feed at over-ripe fruits of mango, Guazuma and Genipa, but have also been observed feeding on the nectar of Vochysia and Paullinia flowers.

The larvae feed on Calycophyllum candidissimum, Isertia and Uncaria species.

== Subspecies ==
- Adelpha iphiclus iphiclus (Mexico to western Colombia, Venezuela, Ecuador, Peru, Bolivia, Surinam, Brazil: Amazon, Mato Grosso)
- Adelpha iphiclus ephesa (Ménétriés, 1857) (Brazil: Santa Catarina, São Paulo to north-eastern Argentina)
- Adelpha iphiclus estrecha Willmott & Hall, 1999 (western Ecuador)

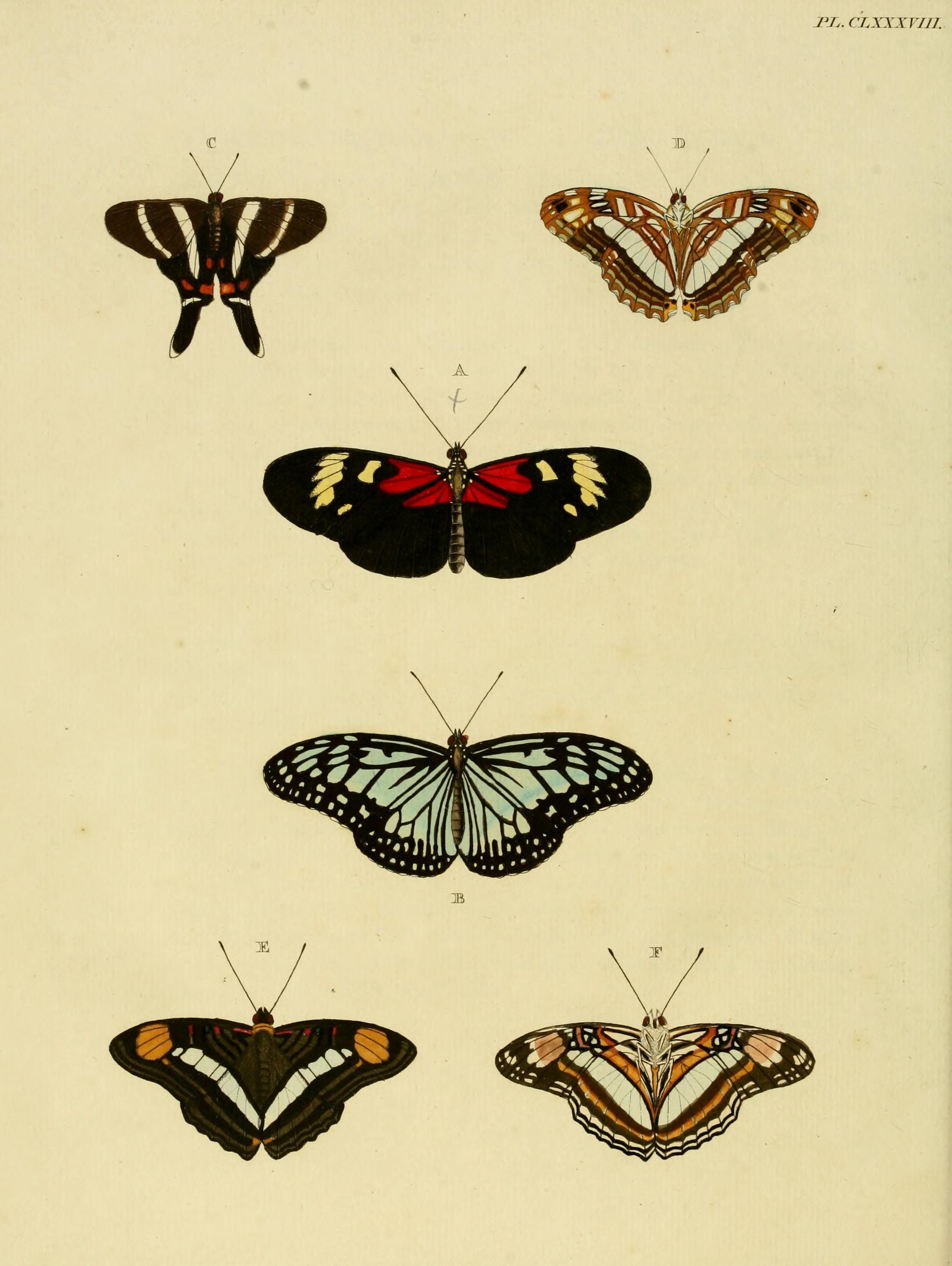
In Pieter Cramer and Caspar Stoll's Uitlandsche Kapellen E and F
