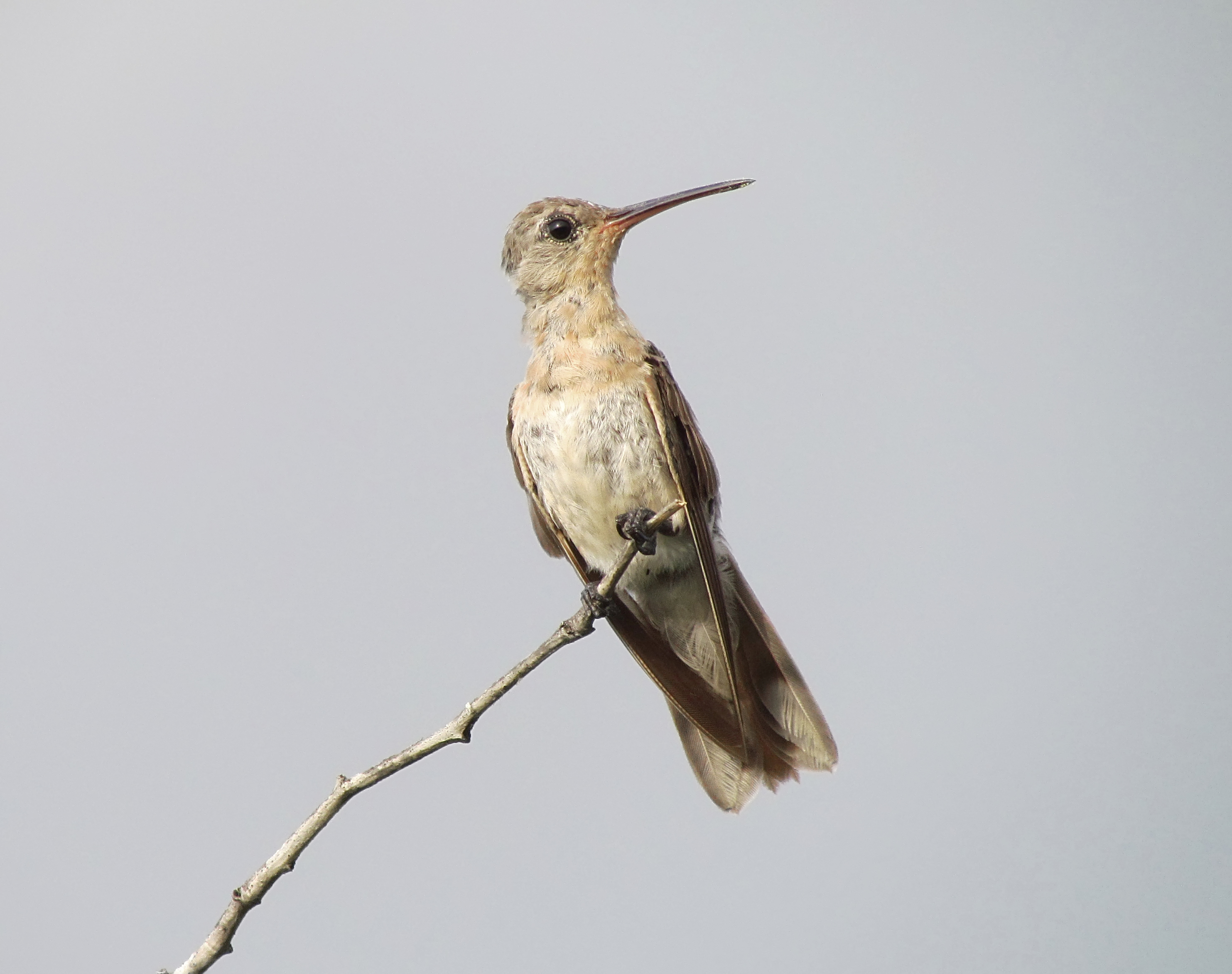

Conservation status
- Least Concern (IUCN 3.1)
- CITES Appendix II

Scientific classification
- Kingdom: Animalia
- Phylum: Chordata
- Class: Aves
- Order: Apodiformes
- Family: Trochilidae
- Tribe: Trochilini
- Genus: Leucippus; Bonaparte, 1850
- Species: L. fallax

Binomial name
- Leucippus fallax (Bourcier, 1843)

= Buffy hummingbird =

Species of bird

The buffy hummingbird (Leucippus fallax) is a species of bird in the hummingbird family Trochilidae. It is the only species placed in the genus Leucippus. This bird lives in dry forest and scrubland in northern South America where it feeds on insects and the nectar, flesh, and juice of cactus fruits.

== Description ==
The male and female buffy hummingbird are similar in appearance but the female tends to be less brightly coloured, and there is considerable variation in shade between individuals. The back and upper parts of the bird are a dull green, the underparts pale cinnamon-buff and the belly and undertail coverts white. The tail is dull green with a transverse grey bar and a rounded end. There is a white spot behind the eye and the beak is slender and straight. The upper mandible is black and the lower one pale with a black tip. The bird ranges from 8.5 to 9 cm (3.3 to 3.5 in) in length.

== Taxonomy ==
The hummingbird is a member of the class Aves, the order Apodiformes, the family Trochilidae and the genus Leucippus.

This genus formerly included additional species. A molecular phylogenetic study published in 2014 found that Leucippus was polyphyletic. To resolve the polyphyly the Tumbes hummingbird and the spot-throated hummingbird were moved to the resurrected genus Thaumasius.

== Distribution and habitat ==
The buffy hummingbird is found in Colombia, French Guiana, and Venezuela. Its natural habitats are desert shrubland, thorny shrubs in arid areas and mangrove areas at elevations of up to 500 metres (1,600 ft). It forages at medium heights and near the ground. It tends to feed near the canopy of the forests that it inhabits.

== Behavior ==
=== Feeding ===
Hummingbirds are specialist feeders on nectar and the buffy hummingbird consumes the nectar of such plants as Agave and Hibiscus and various species of cacti. The hummingbird will protect the flower patches that it feeds from. This hummingbird is unusual in that it also consumes the exposed flesh and the juice of the fruits of cacti in the genus Armatocereus. This hummingbird also plays an important role in the pollination of flowers of Melocactus, carrying the pollen on its plumage as it moves from flower to flower sipping nectar. In addition to plant matter, the bird consumes insects, which it catches in flight.

=== Migration ===
The buffy hummingbird migrates over small distances. During December to April, a period marked by minimal rainfall, the bird is generally found in areas with heavy thorn tree populations.

=== Reproduction ===
Male buffy hummingbirds perform courtship by plummeting from the sky in an arc-like fashion. They also produce mating calls during their fall. Most buffy hummingbird nests are found between the months of May and November, so breeding is believed to occur during this period of time. The nest is cup-shaped and built on top of a low branch or in the fork of a bush. It is composed of the soft fibers of the tree cotton and decorated externally with bits of bark, lichen and leaf. Two eggs are laid.

== Conservation status ==
The total population size of the buffy hummingbird is unknown. However, it has a large range and there is no indication that the population of these hummingbirds is decreasing. Due to these factors, the bird is considered by the IUCN to be of "least concern".
