= Zulia River =

Coordinates: 9.056456°N 72.295582°W

Zulia
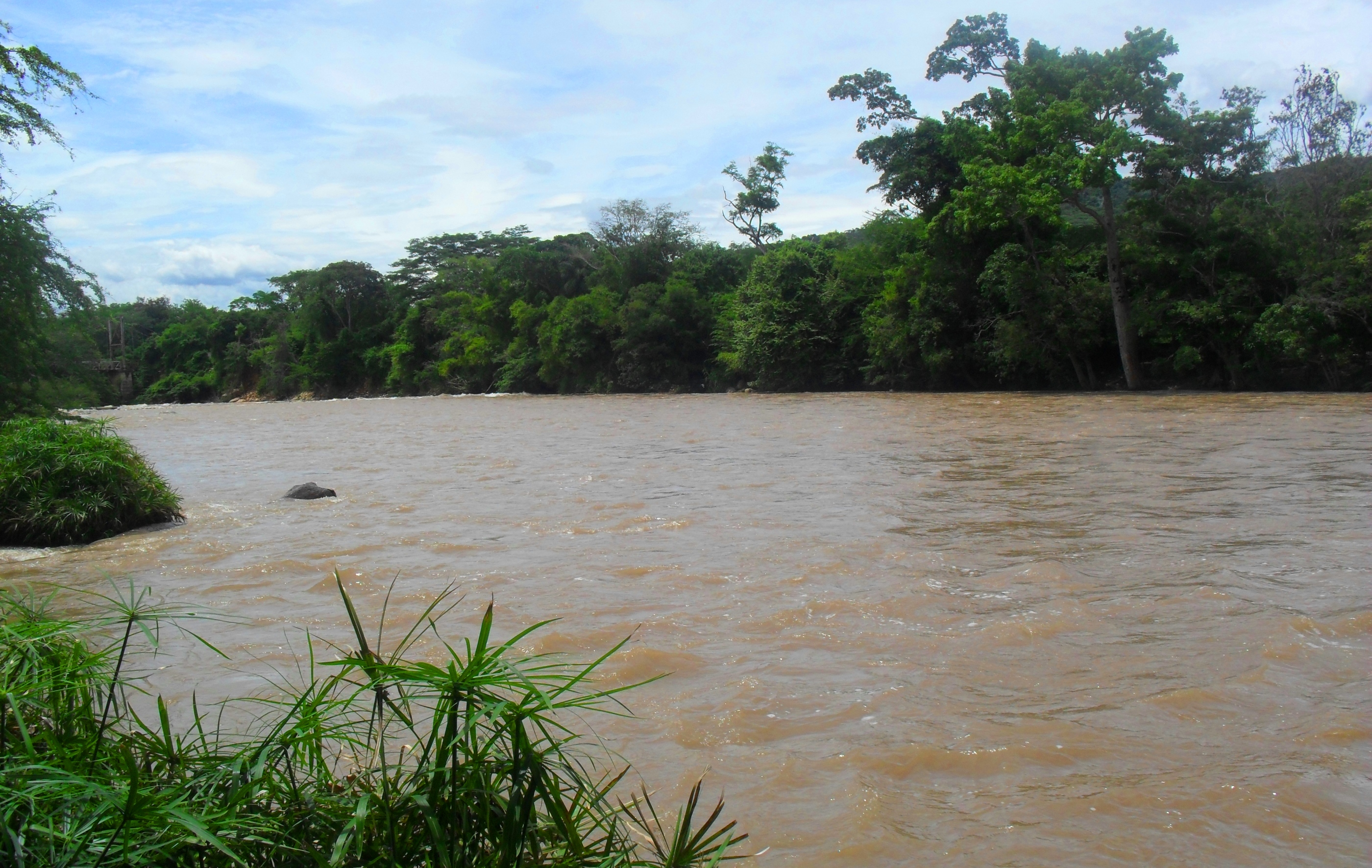

Location
- Countries: Colombia; Venezuela

Physical characteristics
- Source
  - location: Apartaderos
  - elevation: 4,220 m (13,850 ft)
- Mouth: Catatumbo River
- Length: 310 km (190 mi)

Basin features
- Tributaries
  - left: Peralonso River
  - right: Táchira River, Pamplonita River

Zulia River (Spanish pronunciation: [ˈsulja]) is a river in Venezuela and Colombia. It is a tributary of the Catatumbo River. The Zulia forms a small part of the international boundary between the two countries.

Zulia is a state in northwestern of Venezuela surrounded by the border of gulf of Venezuela and west of Colombia. Zulia is one of the 23 state of Venezuela. The State capital is Maracaibo.
