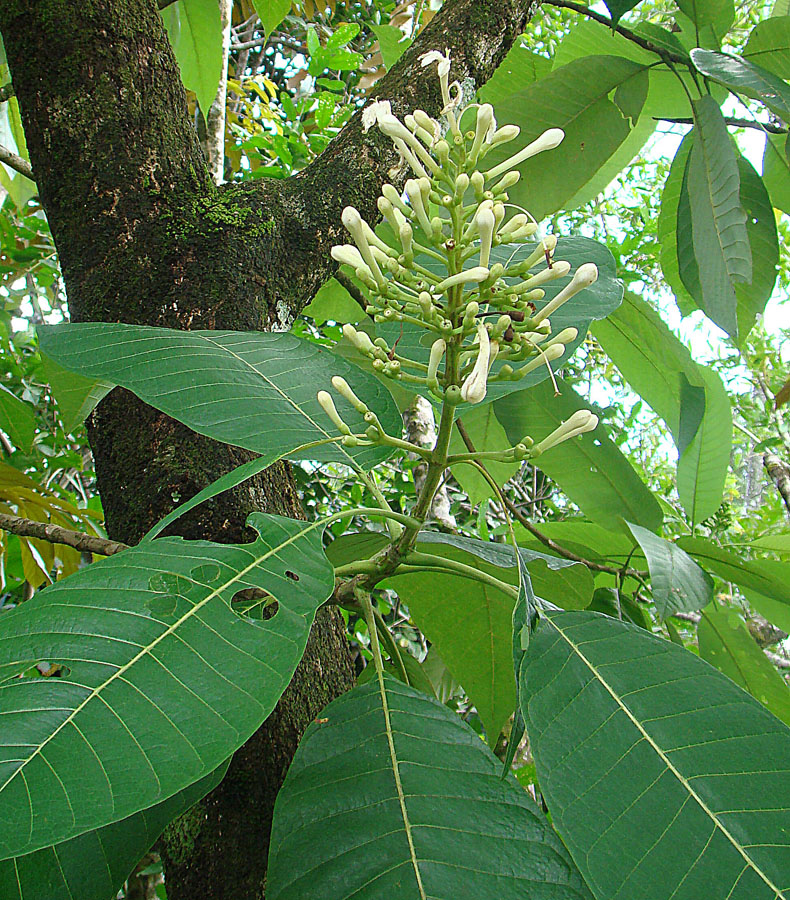
- Isertia laevis

Scientific classification
- Kingdom: Plantae
- Clade: Tracheophytes
- Clade: Angiosperms
- Clade: Eudicots
- Clade: Asterids
- Order: Gentianales
- Family: Rubiaceae
- Subfamily: Cinchonoideae
- Tribe: Isertieae; A.Rich. ex DC.

Type genus
- Isertia Schreb.

= Isertieae =

Tribe of plants

Isertieae is a tribe of flowering plants in the family Rubiaceae and contains about 16 species in 2 genera. Its representatives are found in tropical America.

== Genera ==
Currently accepted names

- Isertia Schreb. (14 sp)
- Kerianthera J.H.Kirkbr. (2 sp)

Synonyms

- Brignolia DC. = Isertia
- Bruinsmania Miq. = Isertia
- Cassupa Humb. & Bonpl. = Isertia
- Creatantha Standl. = Isertia
- Phosanthus Raf. = Isertia
- Yutajea Steyerm. = Isertia
