= Catatumbo moist forests =

Ecoregion in Venezuela and Colombia

Catatumbo moist forests (NT0108)
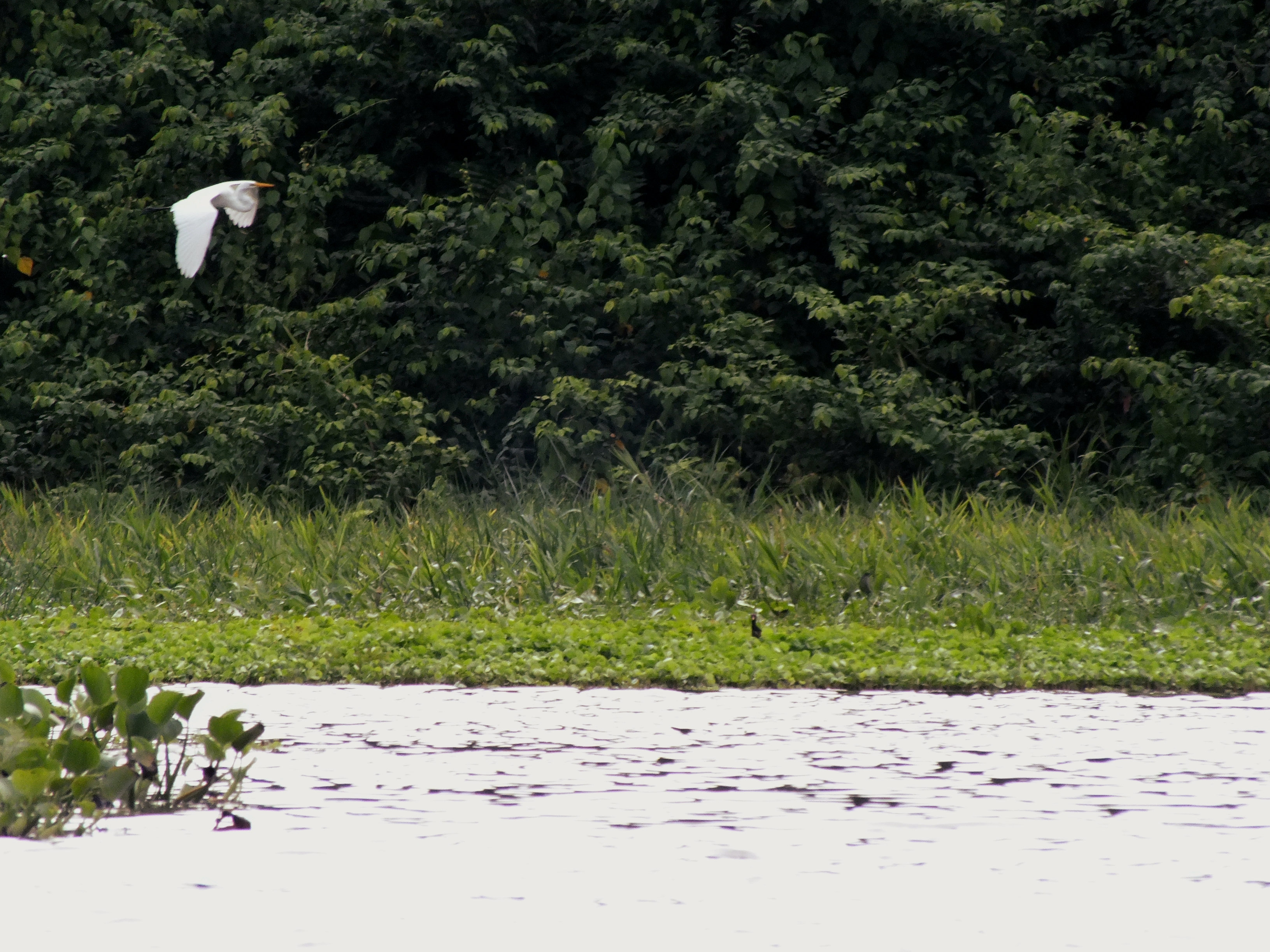
- Ciénagas del Catatumbo National Park

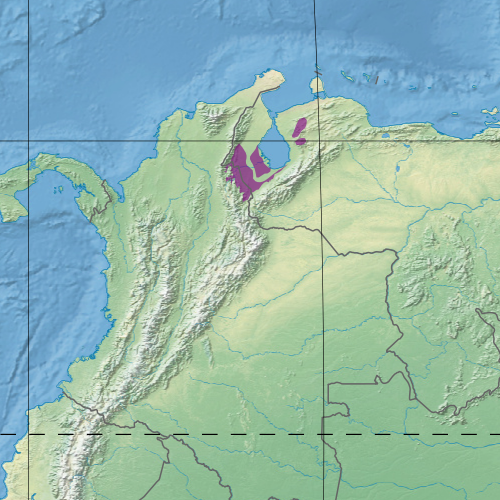
- Ecoregion territory (in purple)

Ecology
- Realm: Neotropical
- Biome: Tropical and subtropical moist broadleaf forests

Geography
- Area: 8,029 km^{2} (3,100 mi^{2})
- Countries: Venezuela; Colombia
- Coordinates: 8.625°N 72.657°W
- Geology: Catatumbo, Maracaibo Basin
- Rivers: Catatumbo, Apón, Bravo, Onia, Palmar, Santa Ana
- Climate type: Aw: equatorial, winter dry

The Catatumbo moist forests (NT0108) is an ecoregion in Venezuela and Colombia to the west and east of Lake Maracaibo. It includes four regions of moist forest on slightly higher ground than the dry forest and mangroves that surround the lake. The forest has unique flora related to the flora of the Amazon basin. It is badly degraded due to farming, livestock grazing and oil exploration.

== Geography ==
=== Location ===
The Catatumbo moist forests ecoregion is in western Venezuela and northeastern Colombia found on both sides of Lake Maracaibo. To the west it extends to the foothills of the Cordillera Oriental of the Colombian Andes, and in the south reaches the foothills of the Venezuelan Andes. It has an area of 802,896 hectares (1,984,000 acres). In Venezuela the forest is in the states of Zulia and Lara. In Colombia it is in the Norte de Santander Department.

The moist forests are mainly found to the southwest of Lake Maracaibo, but include two patches to the east of the lake surrounded by Maracaibo dry forests. A strip of these dry forests runs through the western section of the Catatumbo moist forests. To the west the forests give way to the Cordillera Oriental montane forests and to the south to the Venezuelan Andes montane forests. Along the west shore of Lake Maracaibo the forests adjoin a belt of Amazon-Orinoco-Southern Caribbean mangroves.

=== Terrain ===
The moist forest is found on higher land among the dry forests of the southern Maracaibo basin, and on the foothills of the mountains to the west and south. The largest block has a V shape, covering the foothills and lower valleys of the Eastern Ranges and the Mérida Andes, which extend to the north and east respectively. Between this block and Lake Maracaibo there is another block on land with elevations of 100–300 metres (330–980 ft). On the east side of the lake there are blocks of moist forest on the 1,900 metres (6,200 ft) Cerro Cerrón and on a hill reaching 1,578 metres (5,177 ft) in the northern foothills of the Cordillera de Mérida. Rivers crossing the south and west of the ecoregion include the Catatumbo, Bravo and Onia. The Palmar, Apón and Santa Ana rivers have their sources in the Serranía del Perijá.

=== Climate ===
The Köppen climate classification is "Aw": equatorial, winter dry. At a sample location at coordinates 9.25°N 72.25°W mean temperatures are fairly constant throughout the year at 82–84 °F (28–29 °C). Annual rainfall at this location averages about 1,650 millimetres (65 in). It rains throughout the year, with peaks in March and July. The highest rainfall is in the southwest of the Maracaibo basin, where the prevailing winds meet the cordilleras and release their moisture. Annual rainfall in this area is up to 4,300 millimetres (170 in).

== Ecology ==
The ecoregion is in the neotropical realm, in the tropical and subtropical moist broadleaf forests biome. The portion of the ecoregion to the south and west of Lake Maracaibo is viewed as a Pleistocene refugium for woody plant families, and is the only area north of the Andes still holding remnants of Brazil and Colombia's Amazonian flora. The forested lower slopes of the Onia River basin south of the lake have a number of relict plant species.

=== Flora ===
Common plant families are Bombacaceae, Combretaceae, Lecythidaceae, Fabaceae, Sapotaceae, Tiliaceae and Vochysiaceae. The upper canopy at about 40 metres (130 ft) includes Anacardium excelsum, Carapa guianensis, Ceiba pentandra, Coumarouna punctata, Couroupita guianenesis, Eschweilera species and Sterculia apetala. The middle canopy at about 20 metres (66 ft) contains Calophllum brasiliense, Guarea thichioides, Parkia pendula, Pentaclethra macrobola and Swartzia species. The lower canopy at about 10 metres (33 ft) contains Combretum species, Inga species, Luehea species, Protium species, Trichilia pleeana and Trichilia maynasiana. Other flora include Gustavia hexapetala, Cariniana pyriformis, Faramea capillipes, Ochoterenaea colombiana, Miconia mocquerysii and Vochysia lehmannii. In the western and southern parts of the ecoregion, which has been degraded by logging, agriculture and livestock grazing, there is secondary growth of the genera Casearia, Cecropia, Croton, Inga, Isertia, Jacaranda, Trema and Vismia.

Isolated species along the Onia River include Faramea capillipes associated with other lowland tropical forest species such as Tapirira guianensis, Diplasis karataefolia, Maprounea guianensi, Olyra micrantha, Leandra solenifera, Miconia barbinervis, Miconia nervosa, Mouriri myrtifolia, Abuta pahni and Psychotria capitata inudata. Relict plant species in Catatumbo and eastern Colombia include Ochoterineae colombiana, Miconia mocquerysii, Palicourea buntingii and Vochysia lehmannii. Endemic flora include Anthurium praemontanum, Philodendron mesae, Rodospatha perezii, Spanthiphyllum perezii and Besleria ornata. Besleria ornata is related to Besleria immitis, which grows in the Colombian and Peruvian Amazon.

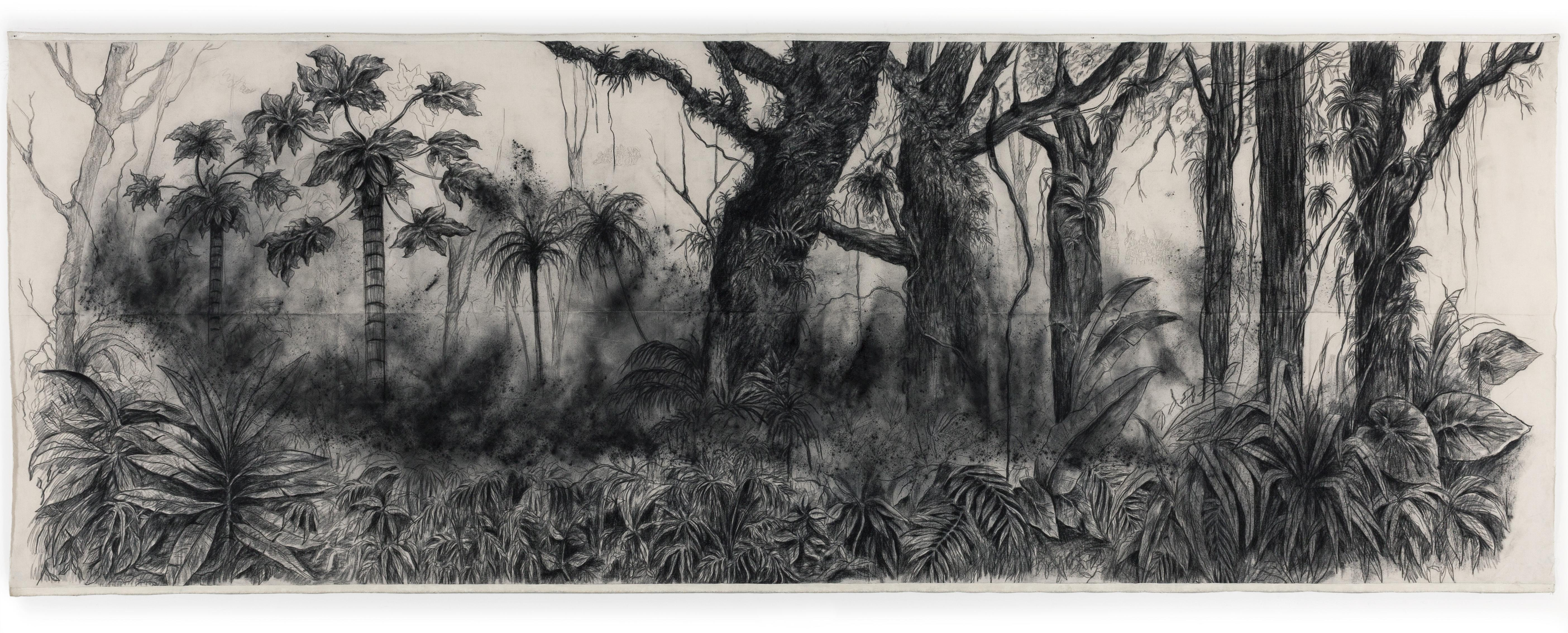
Panorama of drawing of Catatumbo forest

=== Fauna ===
The fauna of the Catatumbo moist forest is poorly documented. The brown hairy dwarf porcupine (Coendou vestitus), a very rare mammal, lives in warm lowlands up to elevations of about 2,600 metres (8,500 ft). Endangered mammals include Geoffroy's spider monkey (Ateles geoffroyi), red-crested tree-rat (Santamartamys rufodorsalis) and woodland Oldfield mouse (Thomasomys hylophilus). Endangered birds include black-and-chestnut eagle (Spizaetus isidori).

== Status ==
The World Wildlife Fund gives the ecoregion the status "Critical/Endangered". Large areas of moist and dry forests have been destroyed around Lake Maracaibo, and the area is fragmented by the many roads in the region. Grazing animals, farms and oil exploration have drastically changed large areas. As of 2002 of the total 23,359 square kilometres (9,019 sq mi) in the ecoregion 16,447.5 square kilometres (6,350.4 sq mi) was agricultural land, while 6,511.5 square kilometres (2,514.1 sq mi) (27.9%) had natural cover or extractive land uses. Colonization is increasing, and oil exploration continues. On the mountain slopes areas have been deforested for shifting cultivation. The southwestern part of the region, considered to be a forest refuge, is the most degraded.

Protected areas include the Ciénagas del Catatumbo National Park in Venezuela. The 158,125 hectares (390,740 acres) Catatumbo Barí National Natural Park in the western section in Colombia mostly protects Cordillera Oriental montane forests rather than moist forests.
