= Ciénagas del Catatumbo National Park =

Protected area of Venezuela

Ciénagas del Catatumbo National Park Parque nacional Ciénagas de Juan Manuel
- IUCN category II (national park)
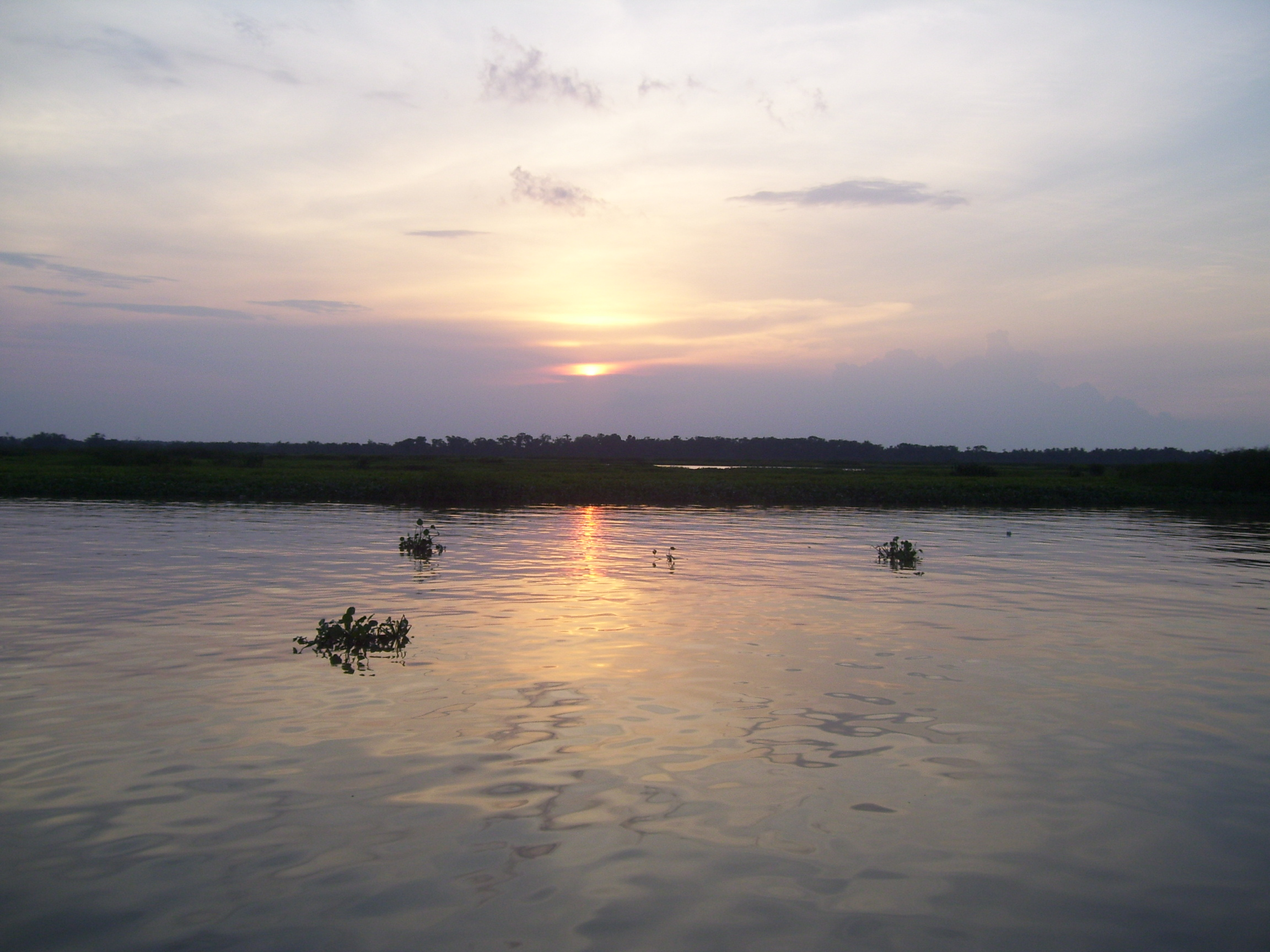

- Location within Venezuela
- Location: Venezuela
- Coordinates: 9°31′N 72°19′W
- Area: 2,261 km^{2} (873 sq mi)
- Established: June 5, 1991

The Ciénagas del Catatumbo National Park (Spanish: Parque nacional Ciénagas del Catatumbo) Also Catatumbo Marshes National Park or Ciénagas de Juan Manuel National Park Is a protected area of Venezuela.

== Park ==
The park is the second natural park of the Zulia state. It includes a segment of the Catatumbo moist forests ecoregion. It is located in the wide plain between the Serranía del Perija and Maracaibo Lake. The temperature ranges from 22 degrees to 32 degrees, with a very high humidity. The area is known throughout the country by a strange magnetic phenomenon, it is an unusually frequent electric discharge that falls on the plain and does not give thunder.

The area comprises a wide swamp between the plains of western Zulia and the lake of Maracaibo, which also covers a small stretch of coast in the south-western area. It is predominantly a large boggy territory, with no prominent peaks or large unevenness or isometric variations, at the mouth of the Catatumbo River. It is also known in Venezuela as Aguas Blancas and Aguas Negras or Ciénagas de Juan Manuel. In the vicinity there is the fluvial port of Foundados, important logistic internode of the lake of Maracaibo and of south-western Venezuela.

== See also ==
- List of national parks of Venezuela
- Canaima National Park

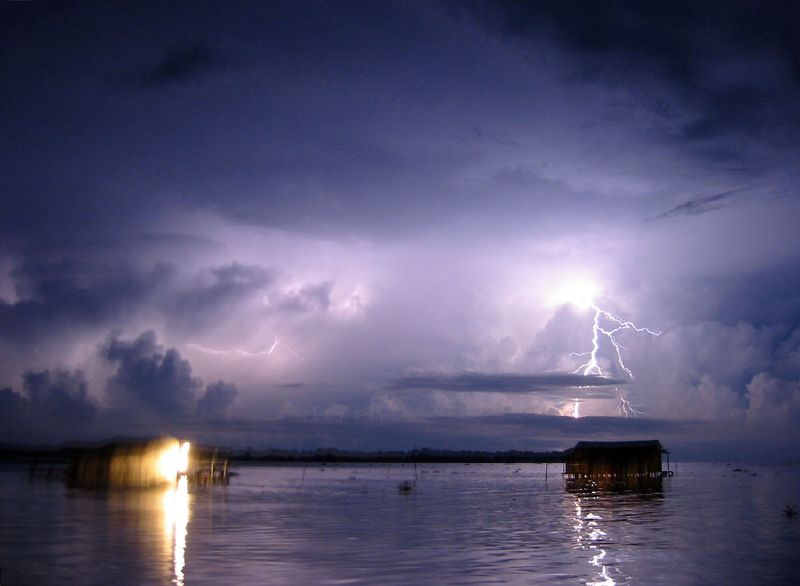
View during a storm
