= Palmar River =

- Mouth location in Venezuela
- Native name: Rio El Palmar (Spanish)

Location
- Country: Venezuela

Physical characteristics
- Mouth
  - coordinates: 10°09′51″N 71°52′09″W

The Palmar River (Spanish: Rio El Palmar) is a river of Venezuela. It drains into Lake Maracaibo.

The Palmar River rises in the Serranía del Perijá. In its lower reaches it flows through an area of the Catatumbo moist forests ecoregion. It then flows through the Maracaibo dry forests ecoregion before emptying into Lake Maracaibo.

== See also ==
- List of rivers of Venezuela
