= Motatán River =

- Mouth location in Venezuela
- Native name: Rio Motatán (Spanish)

Location
- Country: Venezuela

Physical characteristics
- Mouth
  - coordinates: 9°30′18″N 71°05′02″W

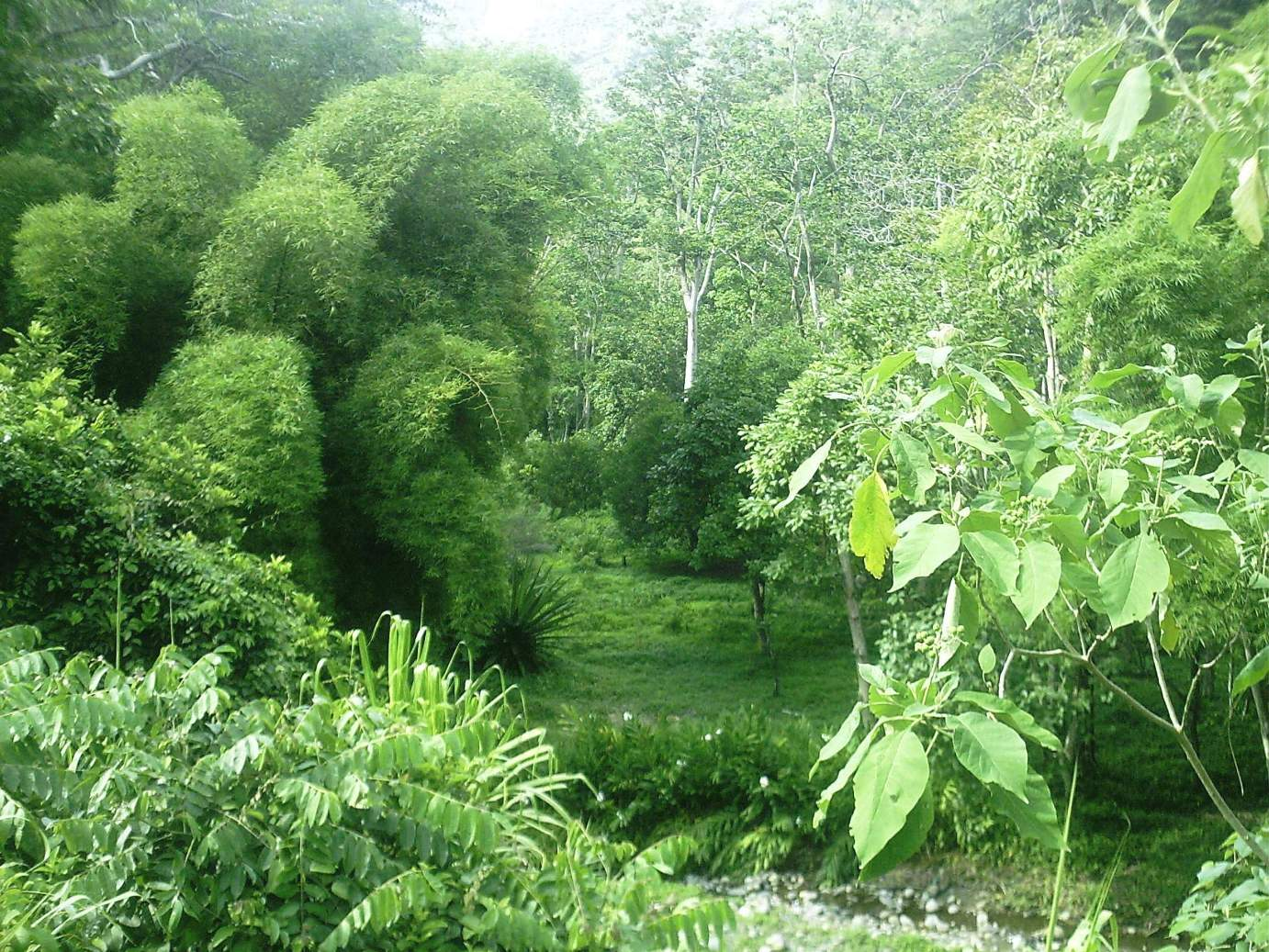
Valley of Motatán river near Valera city

The Motatán River (Spanish: Rio Motatán) is a river of Venezuela. It drains into Lake Maracaibo.

The river flows through the Maracaibo dry forests ecoregion before emptying into Lake Maracaibo from the east.

== See also ==
- List of rivers of Venezuela
