= Apón River =

- Mouth location in Venezuela
- Native name: Rio Apón (Spanish)

Location
- Country: Venezuela

Physical characteristics
- Mouth
  - coordinates: 9°50′17″N 72°06′28″W

The Apón River (Spanish: Rio Apón) is a river of Venezuela. It drains into Lake Maracaibo.

The Apón River rises in the Serranía del Perijá. In its lower reaches it flows through an area of the Catatumbo moist forests ecoregion.

== See also ==
- List of rivers of Venezuela
