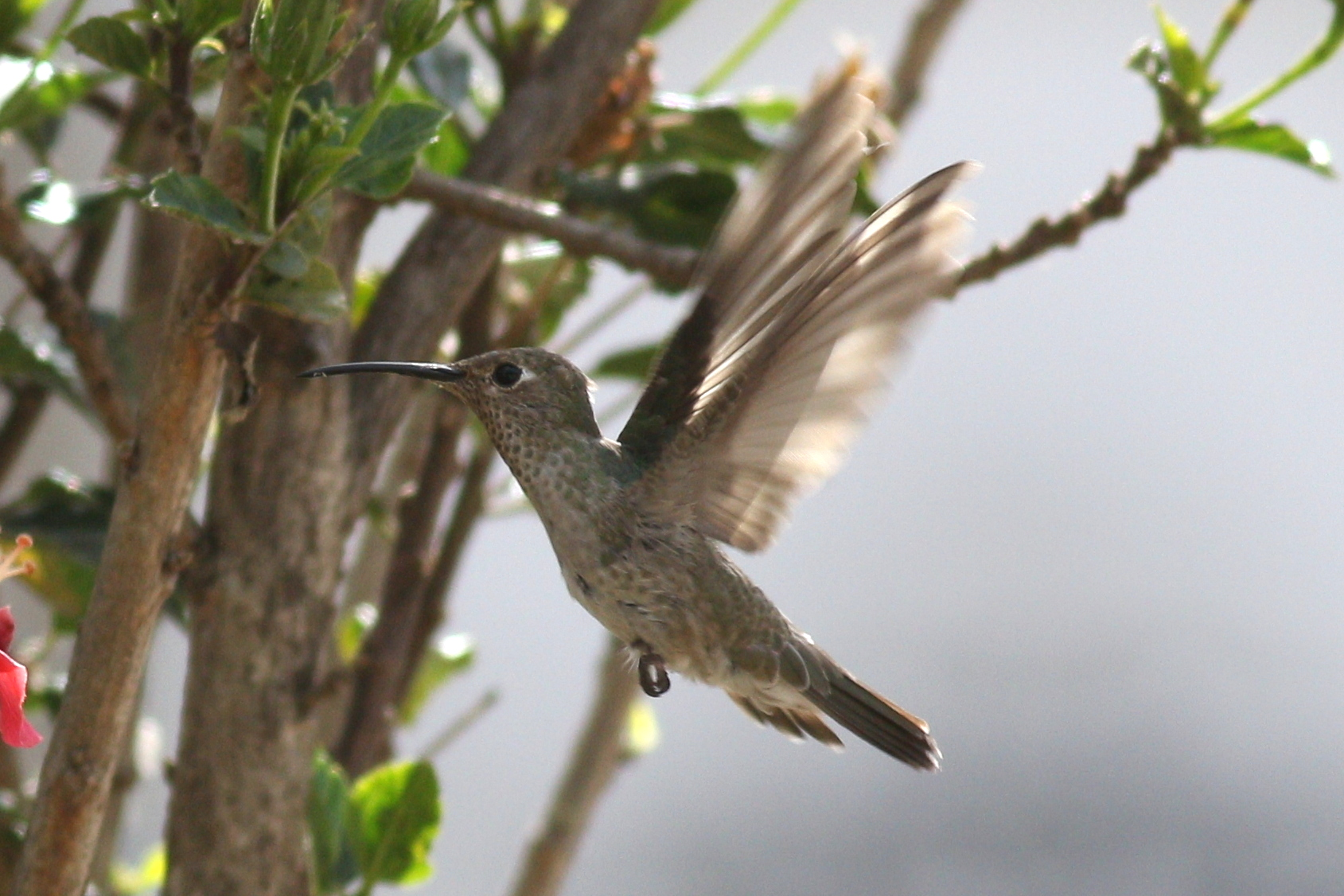
- Spot-throated hummingbird, (Thaumasius taczanowskii)

Scientific classification
- Kingdom: Animalia
- Phylum: Chordata
- Class: Aves
- Clade: Strisores
- Order: Apodiformes
- Family: Trochilidae
- Tribe: Trochilini
- Genus: Thaumasius; Sclater, PL, 1879

Species
- 2, see text

= Thaumasius =

Genus of birds

Thaumasius is a genus in the family of Hummingbirds, and consists of 2 species.

== Taxonomy and species list ==
These two species were formerly placed in the genus Leucippus. A molecular phylogenetic study published in 2014 found that Leucippus was polyphyletic. To resolve the polyphyly these two species were moved to the resurrected genus Thaumasius that had been introduced by Philip Sclater in 1879 with the spot-throated hummingbird as the type species.

Genus Thaumasius – Sclater, PL, 1879 – two species
Common name	Scientific name and subspecies	Range	Size and ecology	IUCN status and estimated population
Tumbes hummingbird	Thaumasius baeri (Simon, 1901)	Ecuador and Peru.	Size: Habitat: Diet:	LC
Spot-throated hummingbird	Thaumasius taczanowskii Sclater, PL, 1879	Peru	Size: Habitat: Diet:	LC
