= Catatumbo River =

River in Venezuela and Colombia

Coordinates: 9.34417°N 71.7106°W

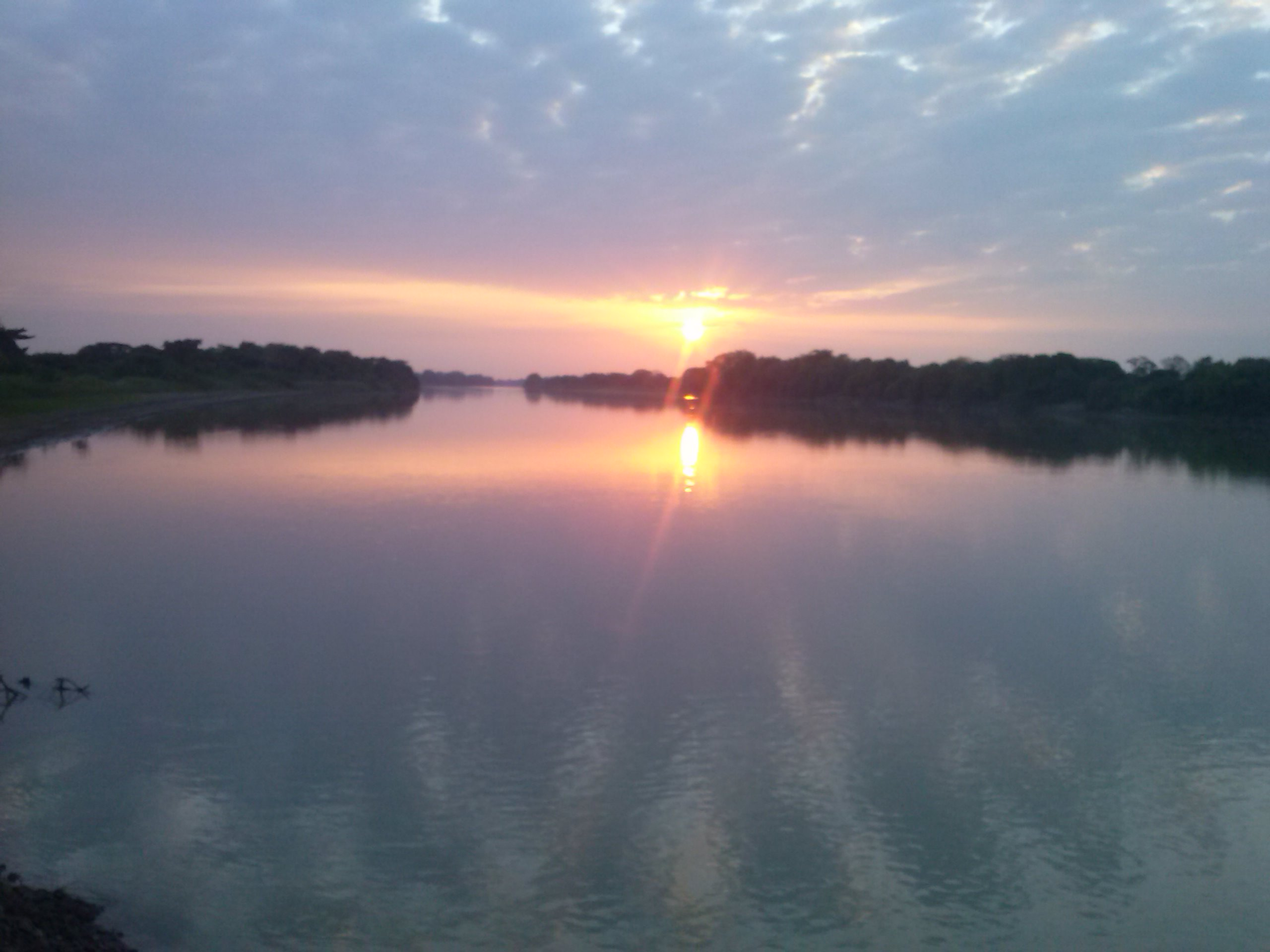

Location
- Countries: Colombia; Venezuela
- Department (CO): Norte de Santander
- State (VE): Zulia

Physical characteristics
- Source
  - elevation: 2,000 m (6,600 ft)
- Mouth: Maracaibo Basin
- Length: 500 km (310 mi)
- Basin size: 22,317 km^{2} (8,617 sq mi)

The Catatumbo River (Spanish: Río Catatumbo) is a river rising in northern Colombia, flowing into Lake Maracaibo in Venezuela. The Catatumbo River is approximately 340 kilometres (210 mi) long.

The river flows through the Catatumbo moist forests ecoregion. It then flows through the Maracaibo dry forests ecoregion before emptying into Lake Maracaibo. Prior to emptying into Maracaibo, the Catatumbo River also merges with the Zulia River.

Together with the nearby Escalante River, Catatumbo is a producing area for cocoa beans of the Criollo cultivar.

== Catatumbo lightning ==
The "Relámpago del Catatumbo" or "Faros del Catatumbo" (Catatumbo lightning) is a phenomenon that occurs over the marshlands at the Lake Maracaibo mouth of the river, where lightning storms occur for about 10 hours a night, 140 to 160 nights a year, for a total of about 1.2 million lightning discharges per year. The light from this storm activity can be seen up to 40 kilometres (25 mi) away and has been used for ship navigation; it is also known as the "Maracaibo Beacon" for this reason.

== Tributaries ==
The Catatumbo River is fed by the:

- Zulia River
- Pamplonita River (tributary of Táchira)
- Táchira River (tributary of Pamplonita)
