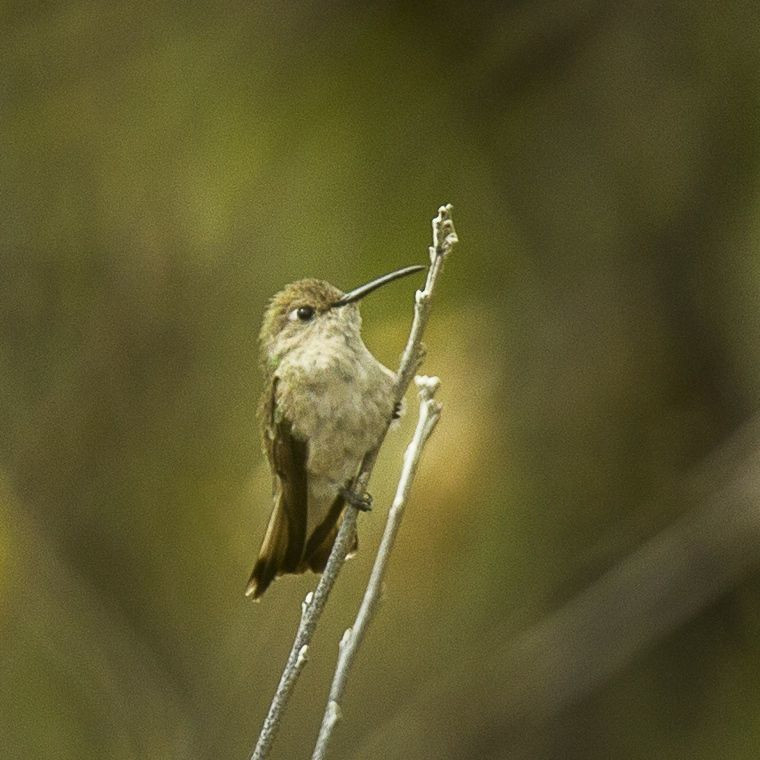

Conservation status
- Least Concern (IUCN 3.1)
- CITES Appendix II

Scientific classification
- Kingdom: Animalia
- Phylum: Chordata
- Class: Aves
- Clade: Strisores
- Order: Apodiformes
- Family: Trochilidae
- Genus: Thaumasius
- Species: T. baeri

Binomial name
- Thaumasius baeri (Simon, 1901)

Synonyms
- Leucippus baeri

= Tumbes hummingbird =

Bird Species

The Tumbes hummingbird (Thaumasius baeri) is a species of hummingbird in the "emeralds", tribe Trochilini of subfamily Trochilinae. It is found in Ecuador and Peru.

== Taxonomy and systematics ==
This species was formerly placed in the genus Leucippus. A molecular phylogenetic study published in 2014 found that Leucippus was polyphyletic. To resolve the polyphyly the Tumbes hummingbird and the spot-throated hummingbird (Taphrospilus hypostictus) were moved by most taxonomic systems to the resurrected genus Thaumasius. However, BirdLife International's Handbook of the Birds of the World retains it in Leucippus.

The Tumbes hummingbird is monotypic.

== Description ==
The Tumbes hummingbird is 8 to 11 cm (3.1 to 4.3 in) long and weighs about 4.5 g (0.16 oz). The sexes are essentially alike. They have a nearly straight black bill. Their upperparts are pale golden green and their underparts pale grayish that becomes white on the belly. The tail feathers are pale green; the inner ones have bronzy tips and the outer ones a dusky gray band near the end and tips that are whitish in the male and grayish in the female.

== Distribution and habitat ==
The Tumbes hummingbird is found in southwestern Ecuador's El Oro and Loja provinces and into northwestern Peru as far south as Lambayeque Department. It inhabits arid scrublands and the edges of deciduous forest in the Tumbes ecoregion. In elevation it ranges from sea level to 1,000 m (3,300 ft) in Ecuador and 1,275 m (4,200 ft) in Peru.

== Behavior ==
=== Movement ===
The Tumbes hummingbird is mostly sedentary though it may make some seasonal movements.

=== Feeding ===
The Tumbes hummingbird forages for nectar from the understory to the mid-strata, though details of the flowering plants it favors are lacking. In addition to nectar, it feeds on small arthropods.

=== Breeding ===
The Tumbes hummingbird's breeding phenology and nest have not been described.

=== Vocalization ===
The Tumbes hummingbird's song is "a complex series of chips and wheezing electric warbles." Its calls have been described as "a gruff dzee and chips."

== Status ==
The IUCN has assessed the Tumbes hummingbird as being of Least Concern, though it has a limited range and its population size and trend are unknown. No immediate threats have been identified. However, because of its restricted range, "it remains potentially vulnerable to any increase in habitat loss, degradation, or fragmentation."
