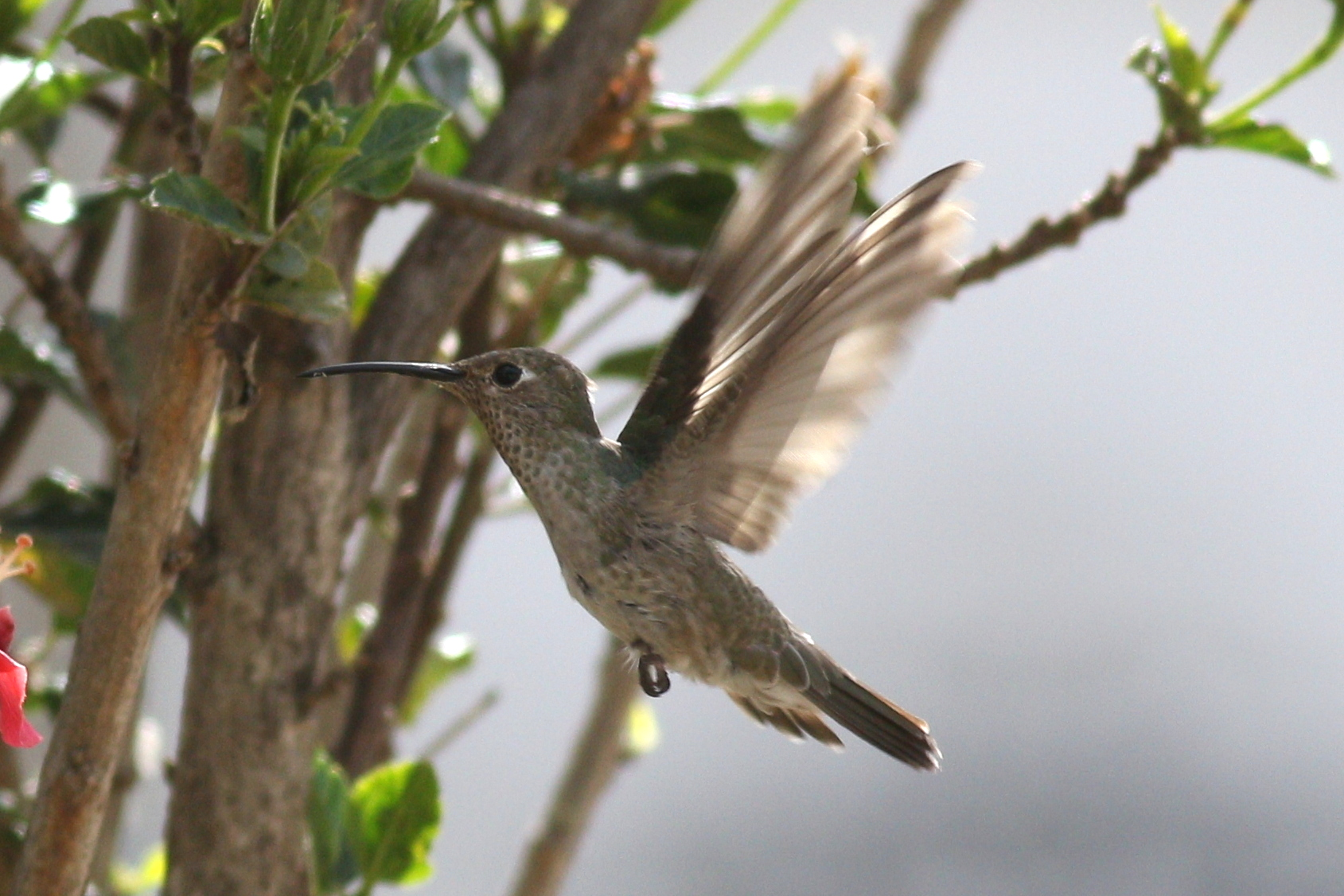

Conservation status
- Least Concern (IUCN 3.1)
- CITES Appendix II

Scientific classification
- Kingdom: Animalia
- Phylum: Chordata
- Class: Aves
- Clade: Strisores
- Order: Apodiformes
- Family: Trochilidae
- Genus: Thaumasius
- Species: T. taczanowskii

Binomial name
- Thaumasius taczanowskii Sclater, PL, 1879

Synonyms
- Talaphorus taczanowskii; Leucippus taczanowskii

= Spot-throated hummingbird =

The spot-throated hummingbird (Thaumasius taczanowskii) is a species of hummingbird in the "emeralds", tribe Trochilini of subfamily Trochilinae. It is endemic to Peru but there are uncorroborated sightings in Ecuador.

== Taxonomy and systematics ==
The spot-throated hummingbird was formerly placed in the genus Leucippus. A molecular phylogenetic study published in 2014 found that Leucippus was polyphyletic. To resolve the polyphyly the spot-throated hummingbird and the Tumbes hummingbird (Thaumasius baeri) were eventually moved by most taxonomic systems to the resurrected genus Thaumasius.

The spot-throated hummingbird is monotypic.

== Description ==
The spot-throated hummingbird is 11.5 to 12.5 cm (4.5 to 4.9 in) long and weighs about 6 to 7 g (0.21 to 0.25 oz). The sexes are essentially alike. They have a somewhat decurved black bill, though sometimes the mandible is gray-brown or even yellow with a black tip. Their upperparts are grayish green to bronze green with a bronze crown and uppertail coverts. Their inner tail feathers are grayish green to bronze green that progresses to grayish on the outer ones, which also have a bronze band near the end. Their underparts are drab gray with golden green speckles on the chin, throat, and flanks. The undertail coverts have pale brown centers and whitish edges.

== Distribution and habitat ==
The spot-throated hummingbird is generally considered to occur only in Peru, on the west slope of the Andes and the Marañon River valley from near the Ecuadorean border south to Ancash Department. Undocumented sight records in far southern Ecuador lead the South American Classification Committee of the American Ornithological Society to list it as hypothetical in that country. It inhabits arid scrublands and the edges of deciduous forest. In elevation in the Andes it mostly occurs between 900 and 1,900 m (3,000 and 6,200 ft) but is found locally as low as 200 m (660 ft). In the Marañon valley it occurs between 350 and 2,800 m (1,100 and 9,200 ft).

== Behavior ==
=== Movement ===
The movements of the spot-throated hummingbird, if any, have not been documented.

=== Feeding ===
The spot-throated hummingbird forages for nectar from the understory to the mid-strata. Though details of the flowering plants it favors are lacking, it is known to feed at Inga trees, Agave, and banana (Musa). In addition to nectar, it feeds on small arthropods caught on the wing.

=== Breeding ===
The spot-throated hummingbird's nest and eggs remained undescribed until 2024. The description's authors examined specimens that had apparently been collected in the late 1800s and preserved in the Natural History Museum of Berlin. The nest is a small cup of plant fibers, seeds, and thin twigs with plant fragments at its base and lined with plant down and other plant material. Photographs of a nest taken in January 2016 show an external covering of lichens. The single 1800s egg was white without other markings. The 2016 photograph includes a female on the nest; a photograph of a nest with two eggs was taken in November 2007. These data indicate a breeding season that includes at least November to January. The incubation period and time to fledging remain unknown.

=== Vocalization ===
The spot-throated hummingbird's song is "a complex series of chips and wheezing electric warbles." It also makes "a dry chatter and tip notes."

== Status ==
The IUCN has assessed the spot-throated hummingbird as being of Least Concern. It has a fairly large range; its population size is unknown but is believed to be stable. No immediate threats have been identified. It is considered fairly common, and "[h]uman activity has little effect on Spot-throated Hummingbird, at least in the short term".
