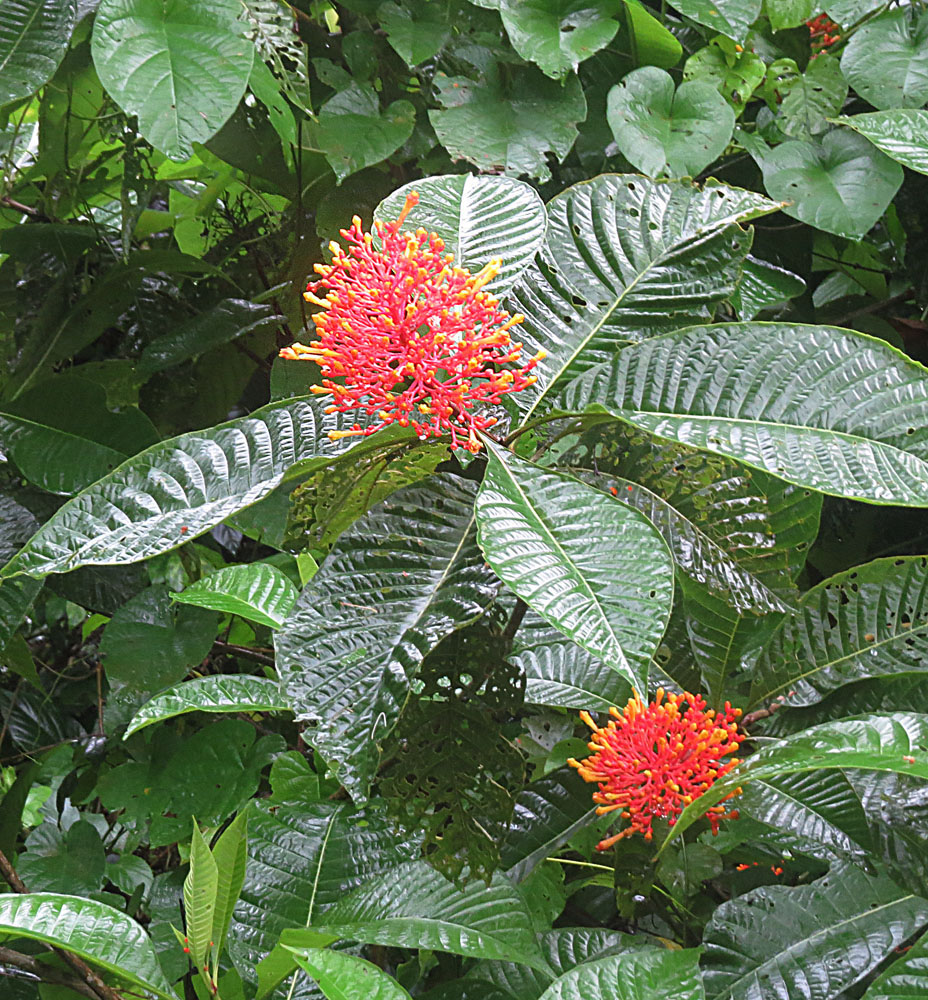
- Isertia haenkeana

Scientific classification
- Kingdom: Plantae
- Clade: Tracheophytes
- Clade: Angiosperms
- Clade: Eudicots
- Clade: Asterids
- Order: Gentianales
- Family: Rubiaceae
- Subfamily: Cinchonoideae
- Tribe: Isertieae
- Genus: Isertia; Schreb.

Type species
- Isertia coccinea (Aubl.) J.F.Gmel.

Synonyms
- Brignolia DC.; Bruinsmania Miq.; Cassupa Bonpl.; Creatantha Standl.; Phosanthus Raf.; Yutajea Steyerm.

= Isertia =

Genus of shrubs

Isertia is a genus of flowering plants in the family Rubiaceae. It contains 15 species of shrubs or small trees that are indigenous to the neotropics. A few are cultivated as ornamentals.

== Systematics ==
Isertia was named by Johann von Schreber in 1789. The generic name honors the German botanist and explorer Paul Erdmann Isert.

Isertia is divided into two sections: section Cassupa and section Isertia. In section Cassupa, the fruit is a berry and the ovary usually has two or three locules. In section Isertia, the fruit is a pyrene and the ovary usually has five or six locules.

Molecular phylogenetic studies have shown that Isertia is most closely related to Kerianthera, a monospecific genus from Amazonian Brazil.

== Species ==
- Isertia coccinea (Aubl.) J.F.Gmel.
- Isertia haenkeana DC.
- Isertia hypoleuca Benth.
- Isertia krausei Standl.
- Isertia laevis (Triana) B.M.Boom
- Isertia longifolia (Hoffmanns. ex Schult.) K.Schum.
- Isertia parviflora Vahl
- Isertia pittieri (Standl.) Standl.
- Isertia psammophila N.Dávila
- Isertia reticulata Britton ex Rusby
- Isertia rosea Spruce ex K.Schum.
- Isertia scorpioides B.M.Boom
- Isertia spiciformis DC.
- Isertia verrucosa (Humb. & Bonpl.) Standl.
- Isertia wilhelminensis Steyerm.
