= Kerianthera =

Scientific classification
- Kingdom: Plantae
- Clade: Tracheophytes
- Clade: Angiosperms
- Clade: Eudicots
- Clade: Asterids
- Order: Gentianales
- Family: Rubiaceae
- Genus: Kerianthera; J.H.Kirkbr.

Genus of plants

Kerianthera is a genus of flowering plants belonging to the family Rubiaceae.

Its native range is Brazil.

Species:

- Kerianthera longiflora Zappi & C.T.Oliveira
- Kerianthera preclara J.H.Kirkbr.
