= Pamplonita River =

River

Coordinates: 8°19′47″N 72°26′33″W

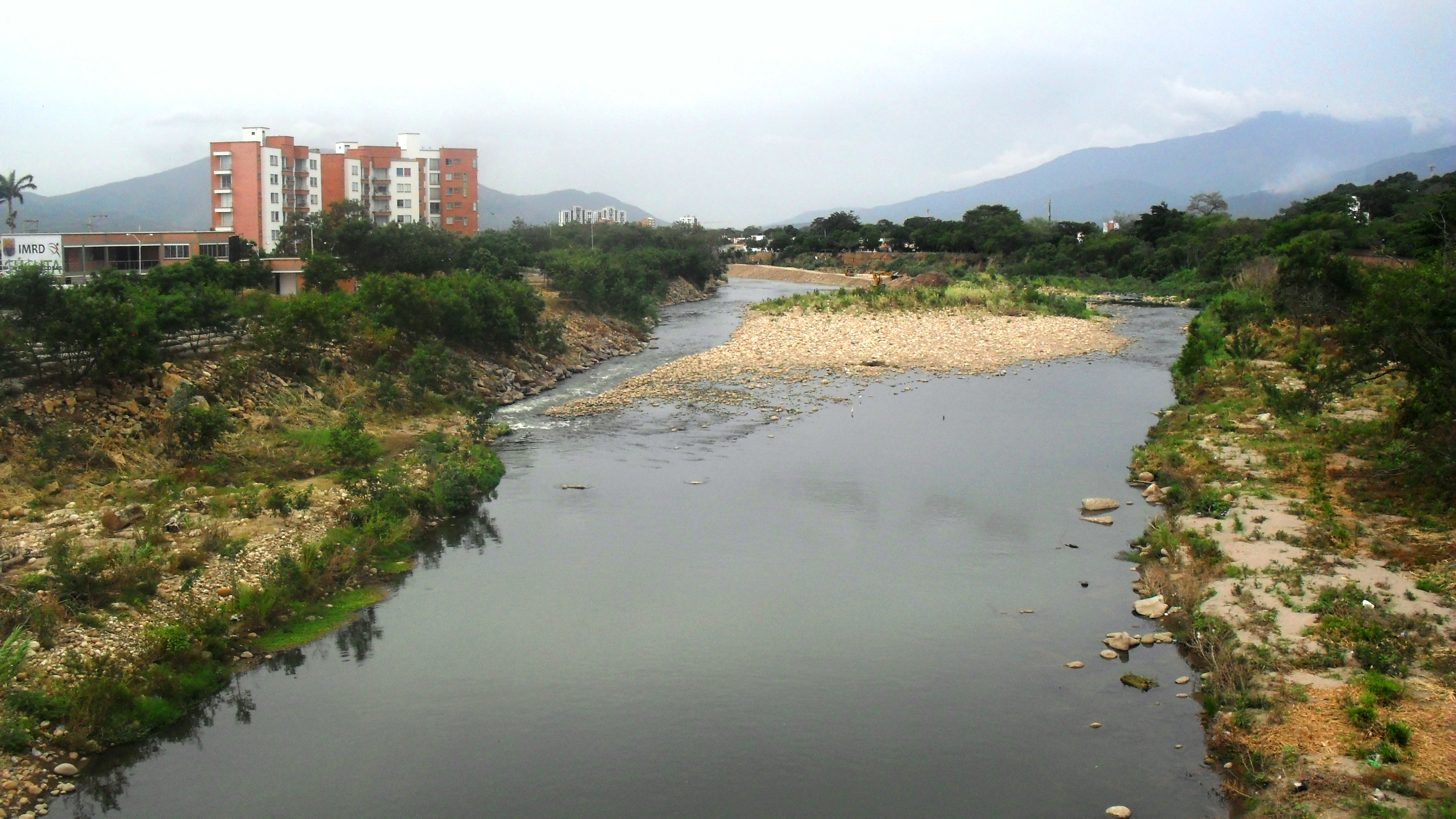
Río Pamplonita – Cúcuta, Colombia

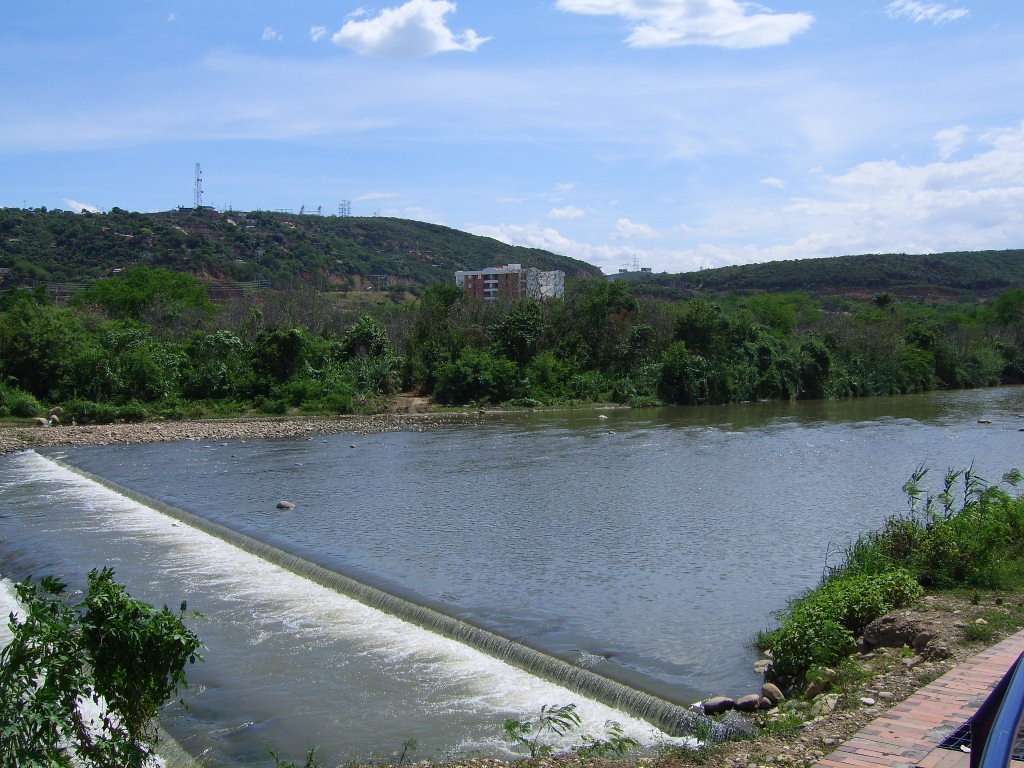
Río Pamplonita – Cúcuta, Colombia

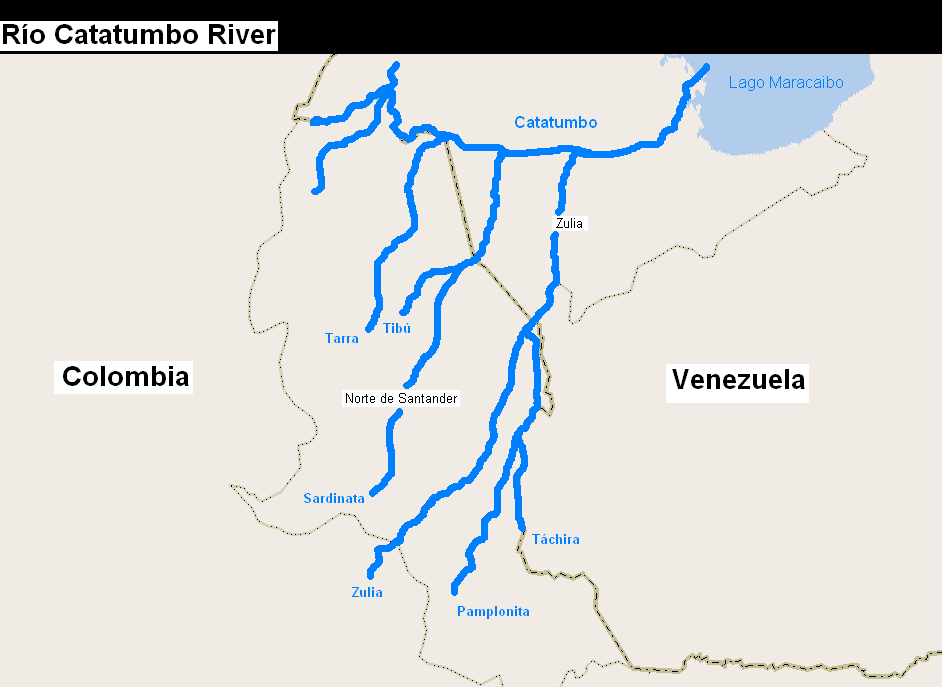
River scheme of the region

The Pamplonita River is the main river of the Colombian city of Cúcuta and one of the most important of the Norte de Santander Department.

The Pamplonita River was used to transport cacao, the main form of wealth in the region and a major axis of the economy during the 18th and 19th centuries.

It begins, at an elevation of 3,000 metres (9,800 ft) above sea level, in the hill of Altogrande, the desert of Fontibón, the neighborhoods of Pamplona.

It descends by the valley of the Cariongo, leaves by the big hole of Pamplona and follows towards the northwest, until the height of Chinácota, receives waters of the Honda gorge and continues lowering until the valley of Cúcuta, through where it happens tired, and when leaving it is joined with the Táchira, until ending at the mighty Zulia river, that throws them to the lake of Maracaibo. Most of his course one occurs to 150 ms on the level of the sea.

Its river basin is located on the eastern mountain range, extending by the southwest of north of Santander, from Pamplona to Puerto Santander. In the 1960s, the World Health Organization worked with national health officials to extend clean water supplies to Pamplona.

Amigos del Río (River Friends) for the Pamplonita River at Cucuta, works to rehabilitate and improve the river.

== Flora and Fauna ==
The vegetation cover in the Pamplonita basin is represented mostly by secondary forests, with an area of 253.6 km². 75 orders, 143 families, and 560 reported species have been identified for the basin. Among the orders with the most representation are the mirtales and rosales, with 7 families; followed by sapindales and liliales (6 families) and fabales, malvales and violales (5 families). According to the lists of threatened flora species and the Red Book of Phanerogamic Plants of Colombia, there are 18 species with some type of threat in the river basin.

=== Fauna ===
In birds there are 19 orders, 52 families and 258 species, the Passeriforme order being the most dominant with 21 families, followed by the Piciforme order with 4 families, Apodiforme, Caprimulgiformes, Charadriformes, Ciconiforme, Coraciforme, Falconiforme with 3 families and another 11 genera with 1 family.

Regarding families, the most frequent is Trochilidae with 26 species, followed by the Tyrannidae family with 25 species, known as flycatchers and pirire, Furnariidae with 13 species, commonly called guito and trepapalo, Thraupidae and Accipritidae each with 11 species.

In mammals a list of 52 species was compiled, registered in 26 families and 9 orders. The most represented family is Murdidae, corresponding to mice, with 7 species; followed by the Mustelidae with 5, which includes the weasel and the marten, and the Felidae and Didelphidae (fara family) with 4 each.

In amphibians, 13 species, 2 orders and 8 families have been identified. The Hylidae family (Frogs) has 3 species and the remaining 6 have one species.

In the book Peces del Pamplonita , a study carried out between 2012 and 2013 by Ecopetrol resulted in more than 60 species, eight of them classified as vulnerable and 23 highlighted as important for human consumption. Another 31 are endemic, that is, exclusive to the Lake Maracaibo basin and 12 of them ornamental.

== Environmental problems ==
The municipalities of Cúcuta, Pamplona, Los Patios, Chinácota, Bochalema and Pamplonita, and the districts of El Diamante, La Donjuana, La Garita, San Faustino and Agua Clara belong to the Pamplonita river basin. It supplies 65% of the population of Norte de Santander.

It receives the first negative ecological impact when it becomes a receiver of waste water from Pamplona, and begins to lose the quality of its water. Then, it becomes the depository of decomposed water from Los Patios and Cúcuta. The city of Cúcuta dumps 722 liters of waste water into the river every second, which represents 76% of the total.

Another source of contamination is the discharges from the slaughterhouses of Pamplona and Bochalema, and pesticides and agrochemicals. Decree 1541 establishes the obtaining of a concession as a requirement for the use of water, as a legal mechanism to preserve the availability of the water resource, and gives priority to its use. However, many of the derivations and intakes that the river suffers are not legalized or subject to control.

=== Average flow ===
In the municipal development plan of Cúcuta 2008-2011 the average flow figures were 15 m³/s, already in 2015 this was drastically reduced, according to the Cúcuta aqueduct and sewerage company the water level is 10 m³/s and in times of drought it is 5 m³/s.

A study carried out by Corponor in mid-2019, resulted in the measurement of the level of the Pamplonita River being 464 liters per second by the San Rafael bridge, while the ring road sector was 762 liters per second.

=== Tributaries ===
The main tributaries are:

on the right bank: the Monteadentro, Los Negros, Los Cerezos, Zipachá, Tanauca, Ulagá, El Gabro, El Ganso, Santa Helena, Cucalina, La Teja, De Piedra, La Palmita, Matagira, La Chorrera, Iscalá, Honda, Cascarena, Villa Felisa, Ciénaga, Juana Paula, Don Pedro, Faustinera, Europea, Rodea, and Aguasucia streams. the Táchira and Viejo rivers and the Las Brujas, Caghicana, and Guardo streams. on the left bank: the ravines of Navarro, San Antonio, La Palma, Hojancha, La Laguna, Batagá, Galindo, Santa Lucia, Las Colonias, El Laurel, Chiracoca, Montuosa, El Masato, Quebraditas, Aguanegra, Zorzana, El Ojito, Jaguala, Viajaguala, Tio Jose, El Magro, Aguadas, La Rinconada, Periquera, Voladora, La Sarrera, La Cuguera, Guaimaraca, Aguaclarera and Palermo. and the channels of La Trigrera, Negro, El Oso, Chipo.

== Recent history ==
The river is 155 km long from its source to its mouth in the Zulia River, its biggest problems are the felling of trees and waste water.

In a 14-year report (1987 and 2001), 2,455 hectares of natural forests were lost and there was an alteration of the flow in the middle part of the basin, by 2001, of less than two cubic meters per second.

In 1991, an epidemic occurred in the river with animals.

In 2007 and 2011, the river experienced a series of crises due to the oil spill. The spill of 10 thousand barrels of oil on the most important water source for the region that supplies 700 thousand inhabitants.

With the first oil spill, 11 families of macroinvertebrates of the 18 existing ones died. After that, a recovery process began that allowed the species to return to the river, but with the second spill only 11 species remained. There were 21 species of fish living there and after this environmental disaster, 8 species remained.

With the 90 km oil spill, the Pamplonita River accelerated 50 years of its disappearance.

In April 2013, a tanker truck overturned, causing a spill of 15 thousand liters of biodiesel into one of the river's tributary streams.

In 2014, hundreds of fish appeared dead on the banks of the Pamplonita River that it runs through, mojarras and fingerlings. Environmental authorities said that this could probably have been caused by the high sedimentation that the river flow presents on the sector where sewage from several urbanizations flow directly, another theory could be that they use the river as a garbage dump in nearby fish farms which gained strength when determining that the fish were not native, however the mayor of Cúcuta on its website reported that the cause was due to lack of oxygen as a result of high temperatures.

A report presented by Corponor in September 2015 said that the river flow ranges between 4,200 and 3,600 liters per second, and due to the drought they are seeking to reduce the supply to the Cúcuta aqueduct by 30%.
