= Táchira River =

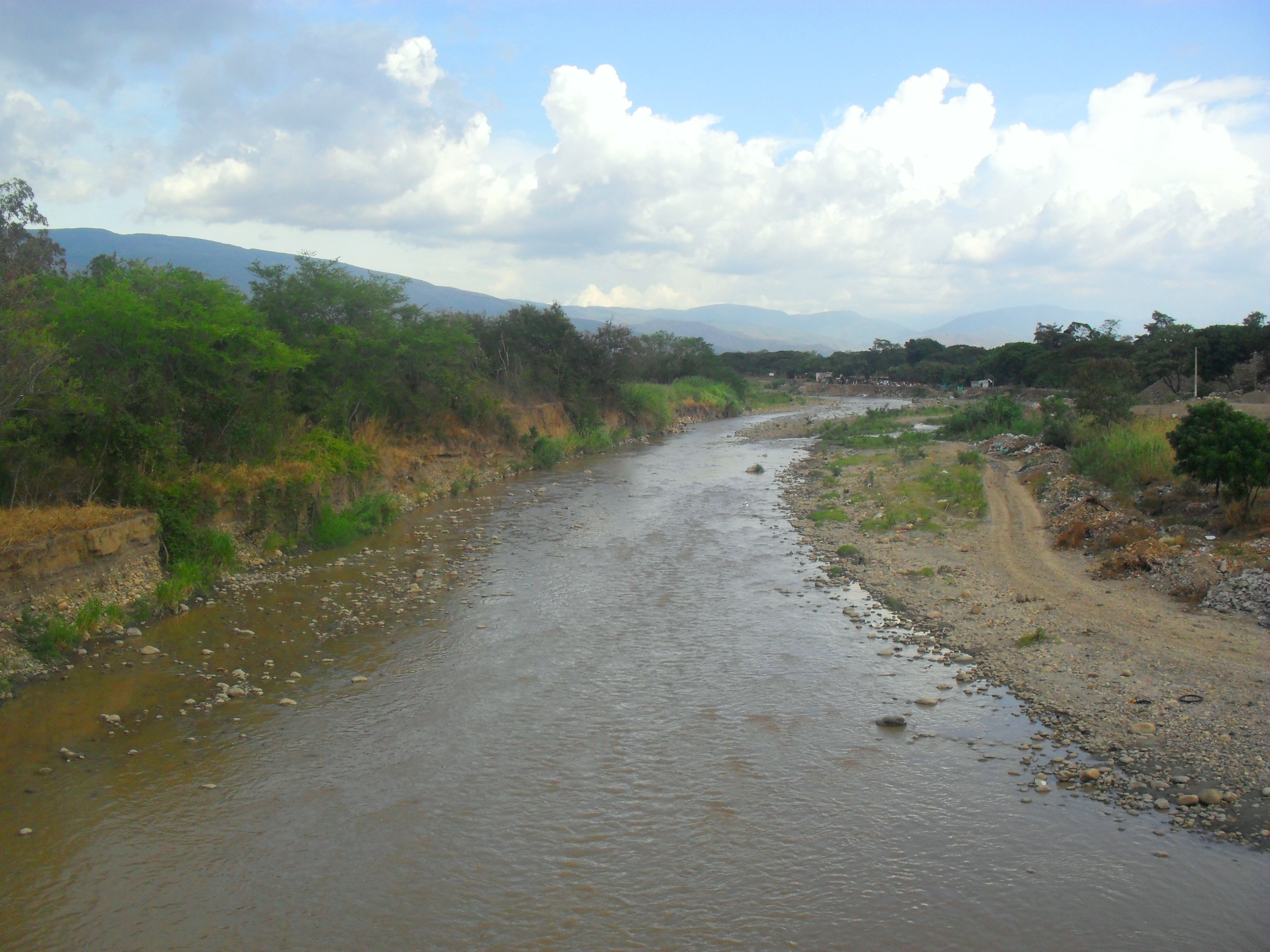
- River at the Colombia/Venezuela border

Location
- Country: Colombia, Venezuela

Physical characteristics
- Mouth
  - location: Pamplonita River

The Táchira River is a river located in Táchira and it divides the border that exists between Venezuela and Colombia in that western state.

The Simón Bolívar International Bridge across the Táchira River connects the city of San Antonio del Táchira in Venezuela with the small town of La Parada in Colombia. The first major city in Colombia after the border is Cúcuta.
