= San Juan de Manapiare =

- Location within Venezuela
- Coordinates: 5°19′27″N 66°03′19″W
- Country: Venezuela
- State: Amazonas
- Municipality: Manapiare
- Founded: 1940

Government
  - Mayor: Pastor Nelson Rodrìguez (PUAMA)

Area
  - Total: 33,100 km^{2} (12,800 sq mi)

Population (2001)
  - Total: 991
  - Density: 0.0299/km^{2} (0.077/sq mi)
- Time zone: UTC−4 (VET)
- Area code: 0248
- Website: manapiare-amazonas.gob.ve
- The area and population figures are for the municipality

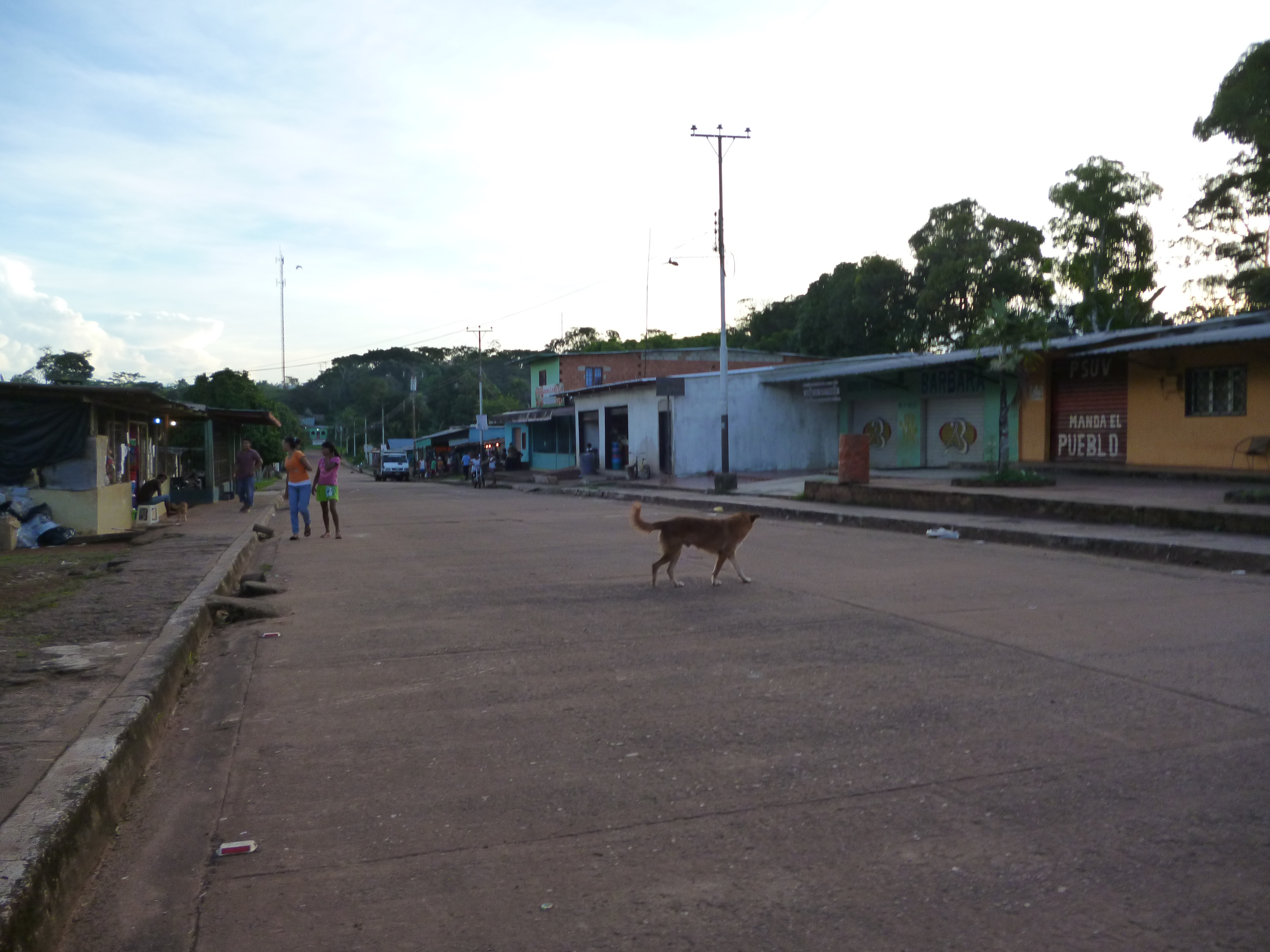
Main Avenue of San Juan de Manapiare

San Juan de Manapiare is a town in the southern Venezuelan state of Amazonas. This town is the shire town of the Manapiare Municipality and, according to the 2001 Venezuelan census, the municipality has a population of 991.

== History ==
San Juan de Manapiare was founded by the explorer Don Melicio Pérez in the year 1940.

== Demographics ==
The Manapiare Municipality, according to the 2001 Venezuelan census, has a population of 991 (down from 4,036 in 1990). This amounts to 1.4% of Amazonas's population. The municipality's population density is 0.1 people per square mile (0.0299/km^{2}).

== Government ==
San Juan de Manapiare is the shire town of the Manapiare Municipality in Amazonas. The mayor of the Manapiare Municipality is Pastor Nelson Rodrìguez, elected in 2004 with 60% of the vote. He replaced Benjamin Perez shortly after the last municipal elections in October 2004.

== See also ==
- List of cities and towns in Venezuela
