= Autana Municipality =

Autónomo Autana Municipality Municipio Autónomo Autana
- Municipality
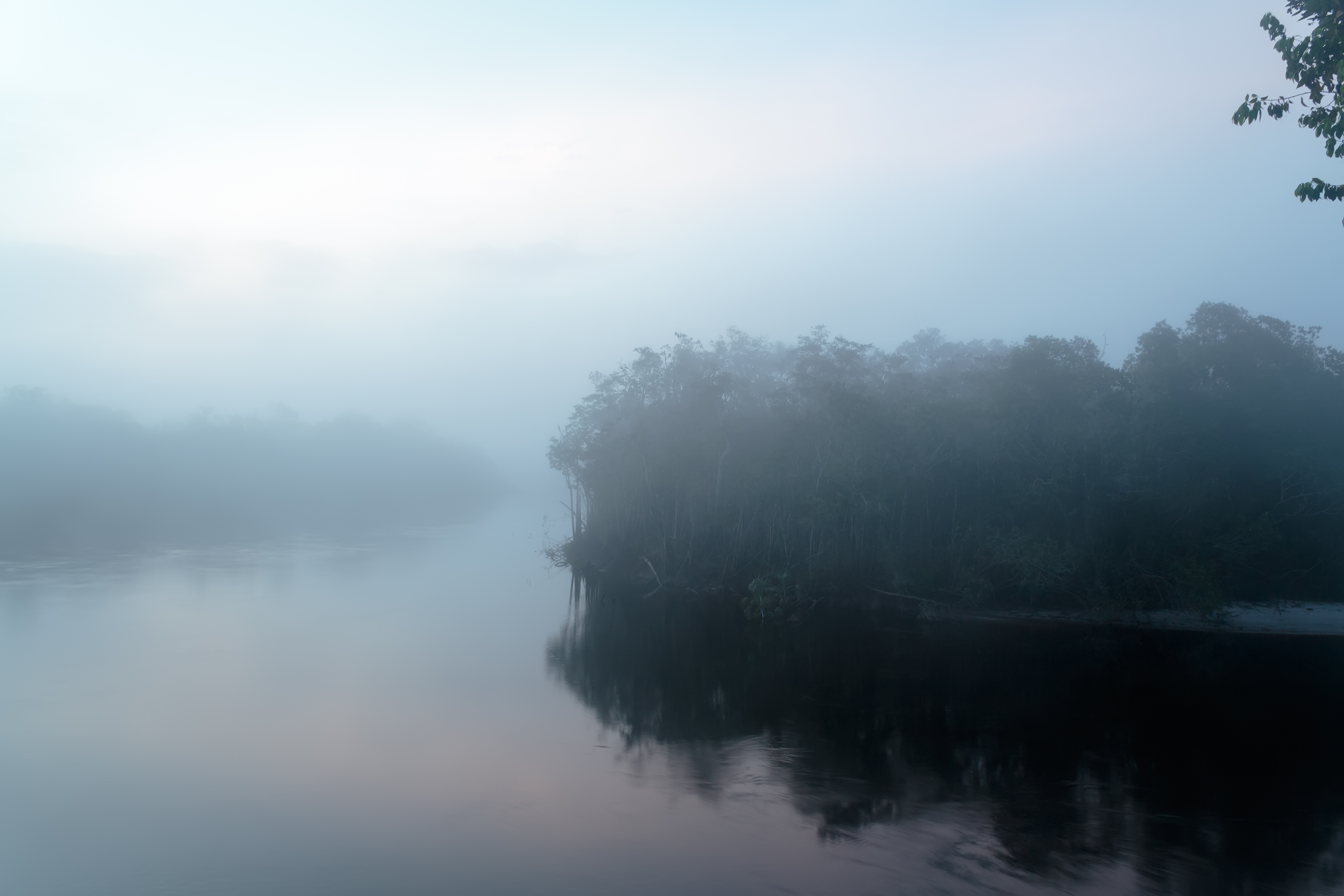

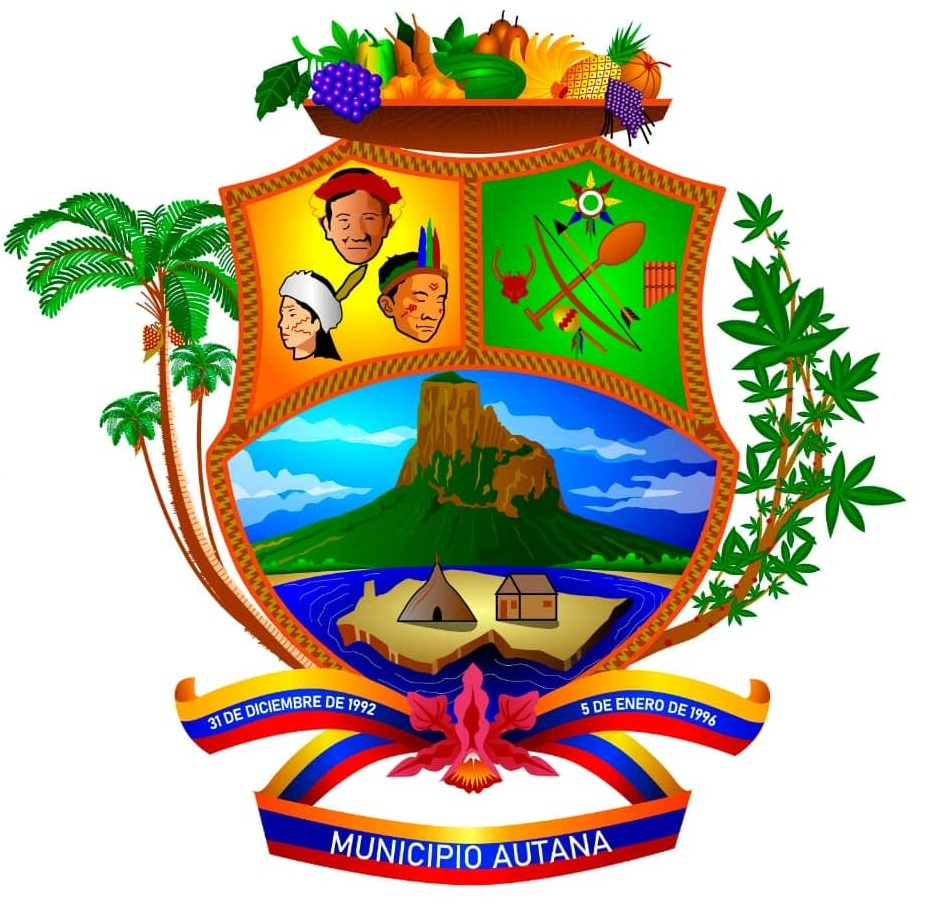
- Flag Coat of arms

- Location in Amazonas

- Location in Venezuela
- Coordinates: 4°56′24″N 67°07′24″W
- Country: Venezuela
- State: Amazonas
- Municipal seat: Isla Ratón

Government
  - Mayor: Jhonny Cayupare Yusuino (PSUV)

Area
  - Total: 15,216.7 km^{2} (5,875.2 sq mi)

Population (2011)
  - Total: 8,352
  - Density: 0.5489/km^{2} (1.422/sq mi)
- Time zone: UTC−4 (VET)
- Area code(s): 0248
- Website: autana-amazonas.gob.ve

The Autana Municipality (Spanish: Municipio Autana) is one of the seven municipalities (municipios) that makes up the southern Venezuelan state of Amazonas and, according to the 2011 census by the National Institute of Statistics of Venezuela, the municipality has a population of 8,352. The town of Isla Ratón is the shire town of the Autana Municipality.

== History ==
The shiretown of the Autana Municipality, Isla de Ratón, was founded by a group led by Pedro Loroima in 1943.

== Demographics ==
The Autana Municipality, according to a 2007 population estimate by the National Institute of Statistics of Venezuela, has a population of 8,181 (up from 6,524 in 2000). This amounts to 5.8% of the state's population. The municipality's population density is 0.5 inhabitants per square kilometre (1.3/sq mi).

== Government ==
The mayor of the Autana Municipality is Bernabe Arana, re-elected on October 31, 2004, with 45% of the vote. The municipality is divided into four parishes; Samariapo, Sipapo, Munduapo, and Guayapo (before December 18, 1997, the Autana Municipality contained only a single parish).

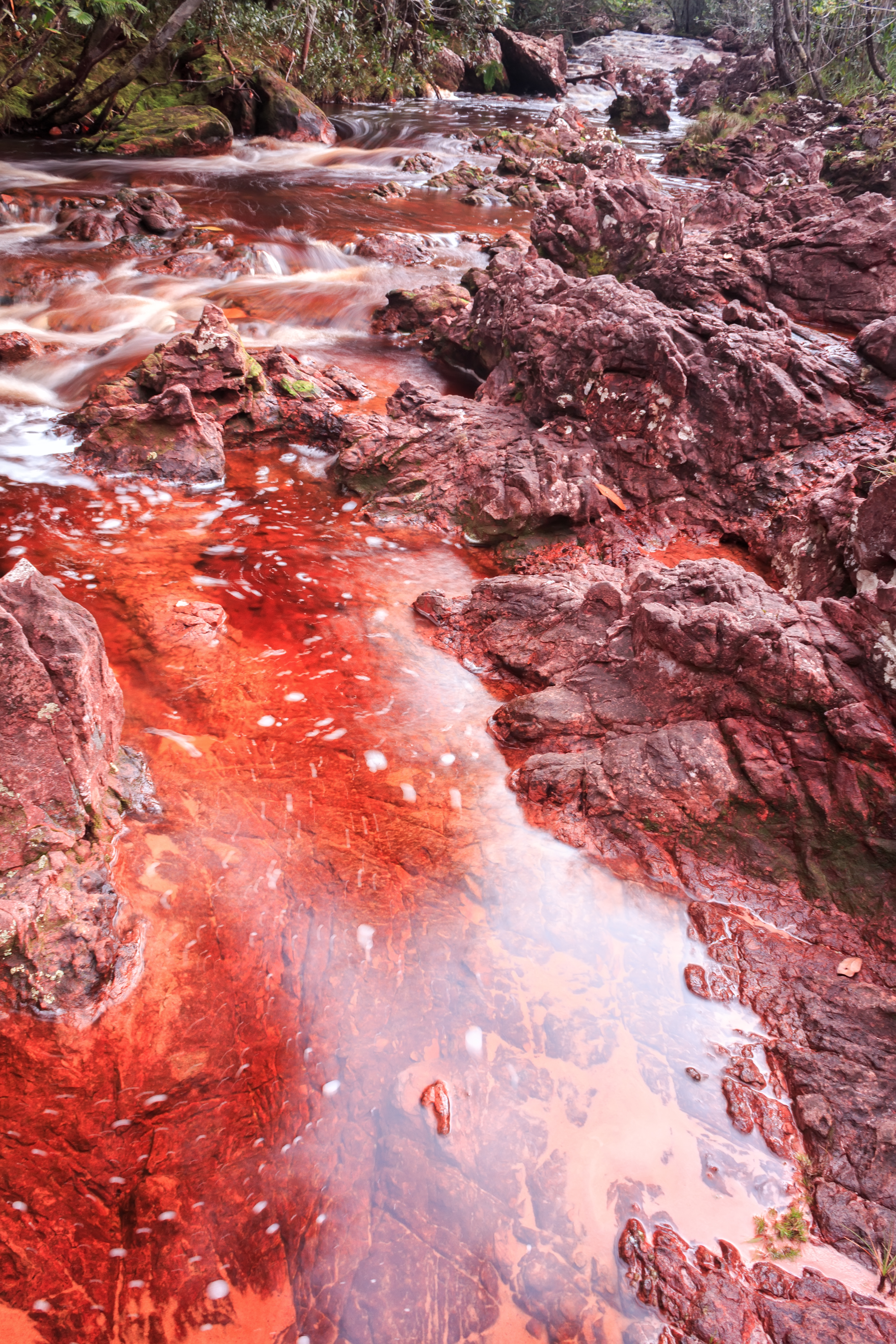
Rio Zorro, Autana Municipality

== See also ==
- Amazonas
- Municipalities of Venezuela
