= Isla Ratón =

- El Carmen de Ratón
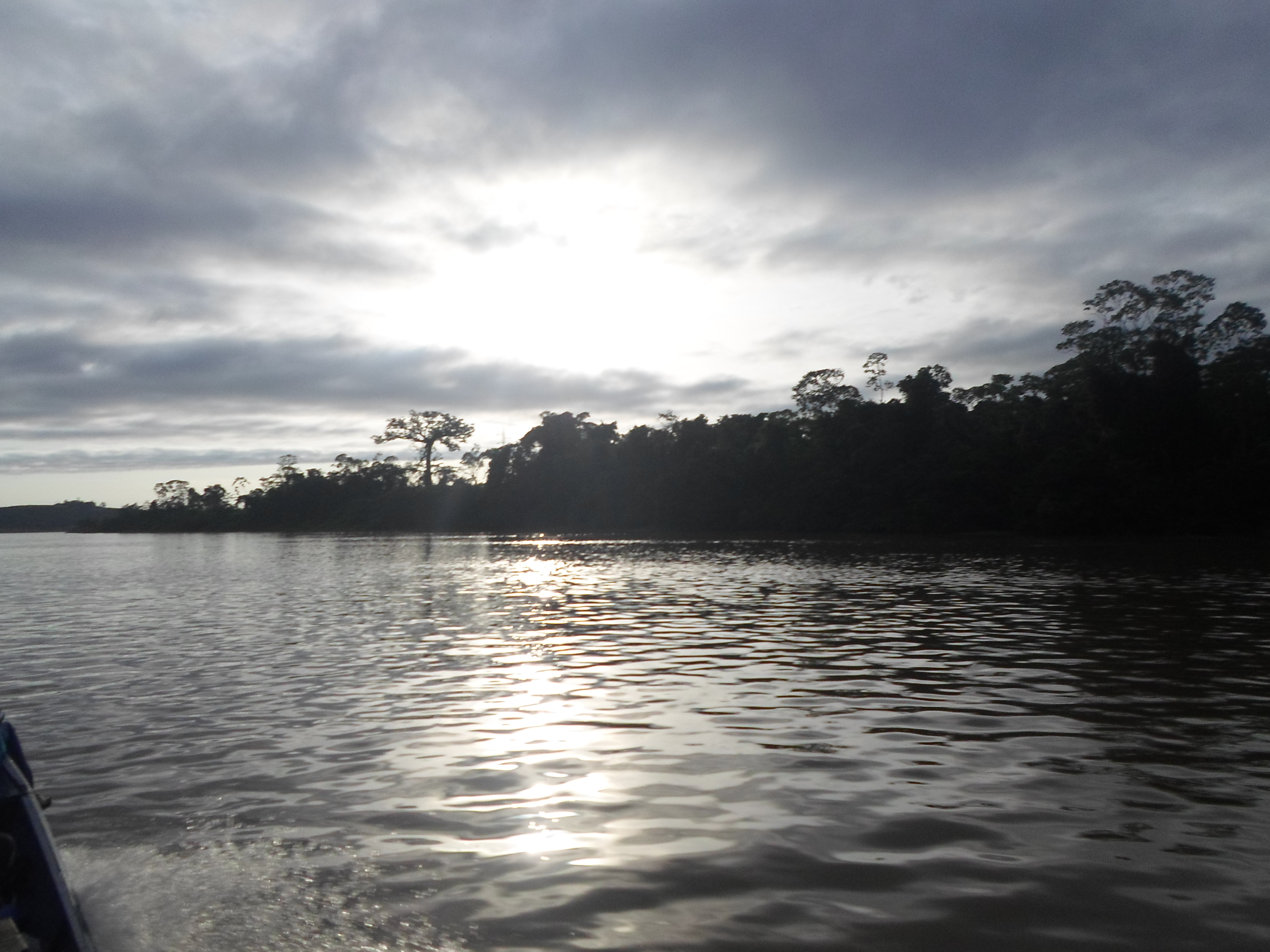
- Island view

- Location within Venezuela
- Coordinates: 5°7′52″N 67°48′38″W
- Country: Venezuela
- State: Amazonas
- Municipality: Autana Municipality
- Founded: 1920

Area
  - Total: 40 km^{2} (15 sq mi)

Population (2011)
  - Total: 12,612
- Time zone: UTC−4 (VET)
- Am: Climate

Isla Ratón (Ratón Island) is a Venezuelan town (also called Carmen de Ratón) and the capital of Autana in the state of Amazonas. The name Isla Ratón can also refer to the 40 km² fluvial island on which the town stands, located in the course of the Orinoco River across the border from Puerto Carreño,Vichada in the Republic of Colombia.

The town had a population of 12,612 inhabitants according to the 2011 census, but by 2021 it was estimated that the island's population was below 2,000, with residents having left for other parts of Venezuela or Colombia. Residents and leaders of Isla Ratón have looked to expand the town's popularity as a tourist destination, given its proximity to Cerro Autana, but fuel and medicine shortages have stymied the effort.

== History ==
Carmen de Ratón was founded by around 1920 by Pedro Joroima, and named due to the island's resemblance to a mouse. Agriculture was the town's main livelihood and source of income.

== See also ==
- List of cities and towns in Venezuela
