= Manapiare Municipality =

Autónomo Manapiare Municipality Municipio Autónomo Manapiare
- Municipality
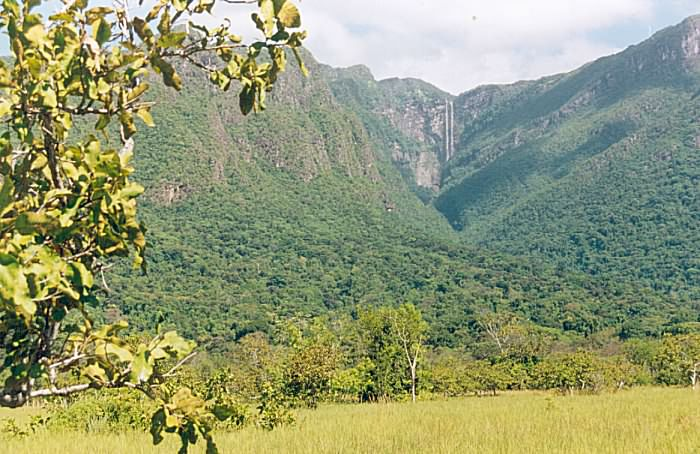
- Salto Yutajé, Manapiare Municipality

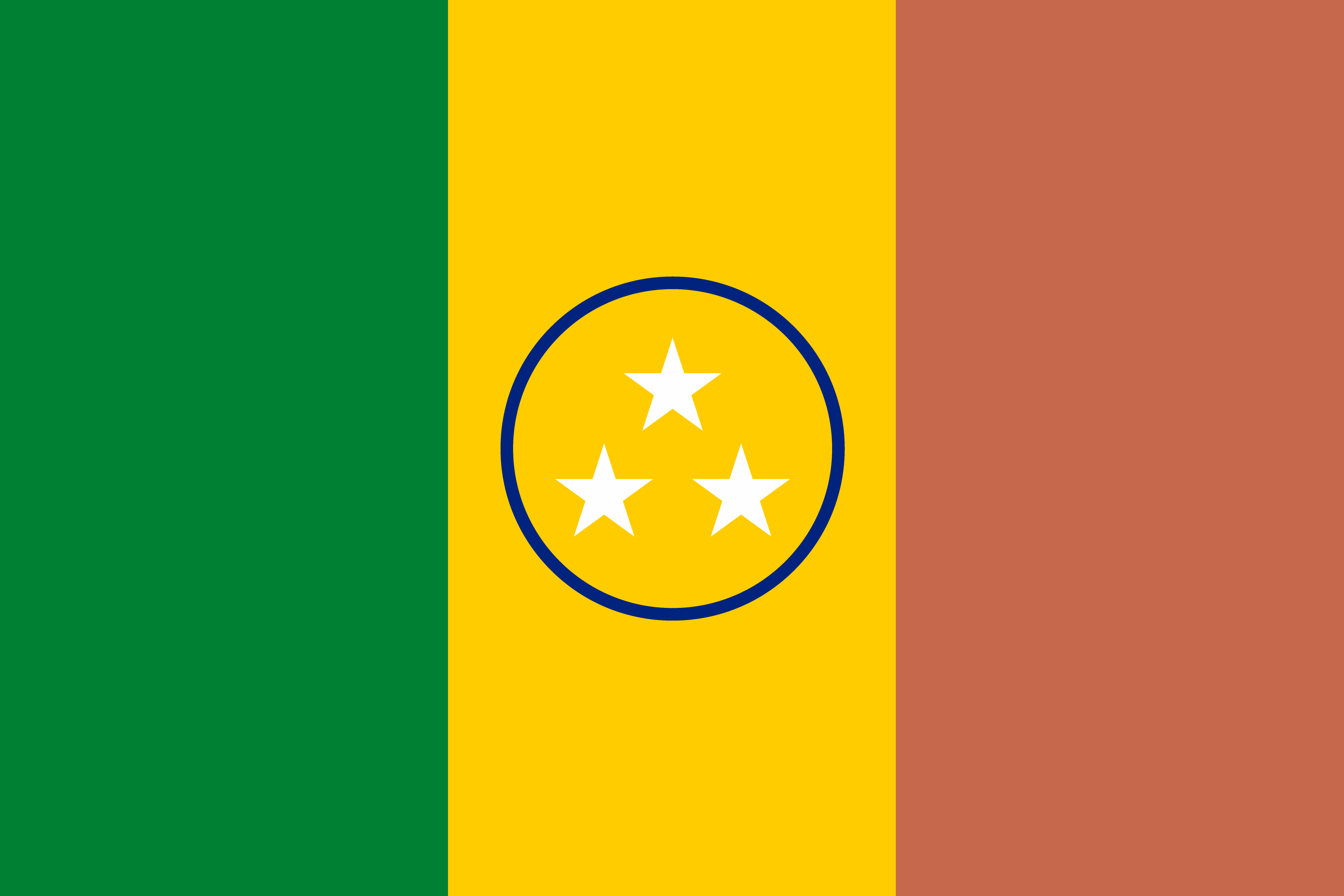
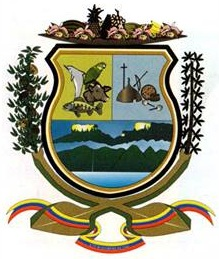
- Flag Coat of arms

- Location in Amazonas

- Location in Venezuela
- Coordinates: 5°03′02″N 65°48′38″W
- Country: Venezuela
- State: Amazonas
- Municipal seat: San Juan de Manapiare

Government
  - Mayor: Nelson Martínez (PSUV)

Area
  - Total: 33,915.2 km^{2} (13,094.7 sq mi)

Population (2011)
  - Total: 7,715
  - Density: 0.2275/km^{2} (0.5892/sq mi)
- Time zone: UTC−4 (VET)
- Area code(s): 0248
- Website: Official website

The Manapiare Municipality (Spanish: Municipio Manapiare) is one of the seven municipalities (municipios) that makes up the southern Venezuelan state of Amazonas and, according to the 2011 census by the National Institute of Statistics of Venezuela, the municipality has a population of 7,715. The town of San Juan de Manapiare is the shire town of the Manapiare Municipality.

== History ==
The town of San Juan de Manapiare was founded by the explorer Don Melicio Pérez in the year 1940.

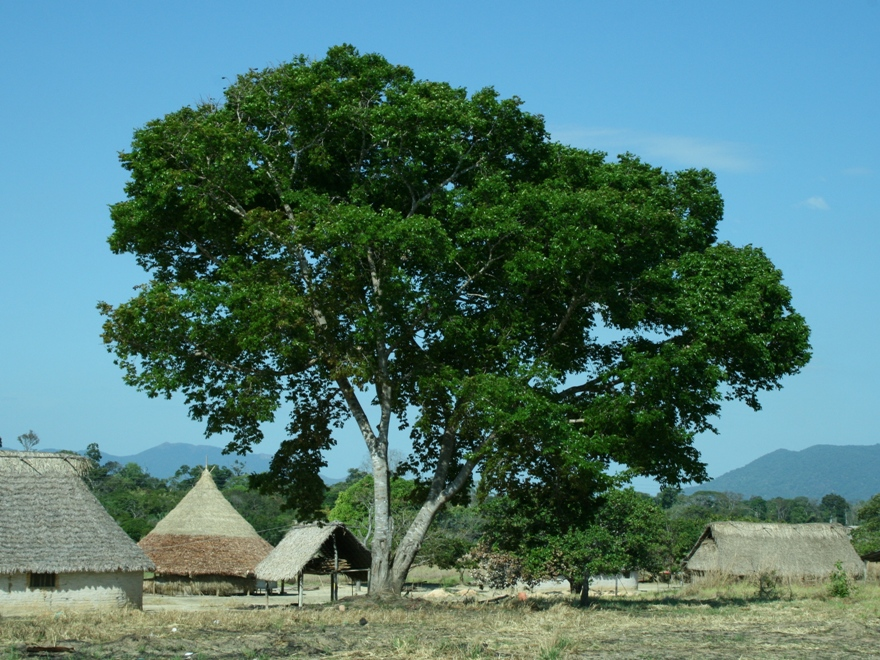
Manapiare Municipality

== Demographics ==
The Manapiare Municipality, according to a 2007 population estimate by the National Institute of Statistics of Venezuela, has a population of 9,658 (up from 7,647 in 2000). This amounts to 6.8% of the state's population. The municipality's population density is 0.3 inhabitants per square kilometre (0.78/sq mi).

== Government ==
The mayor of the Manapiare Municipality is Pastor Nelson Rodrìguez, elected on October 31, 2004, with 60% of the vote. He replaced Benjamin Perez shortly after the elections. The municipality is divided into three parishes; Alto Ventuari, Medio Ventuari, and Bajo Ventuari (previous to December 18, 1997, the Manapiare Municipality contained only a single parish).

== See also ==
- San Juan de Manapiare
- Amazonas
- Municipalities of Venezuela
