= Amazonas (Venezuelan state) =

Coordinates: 3°30′N 66°00′W

- State
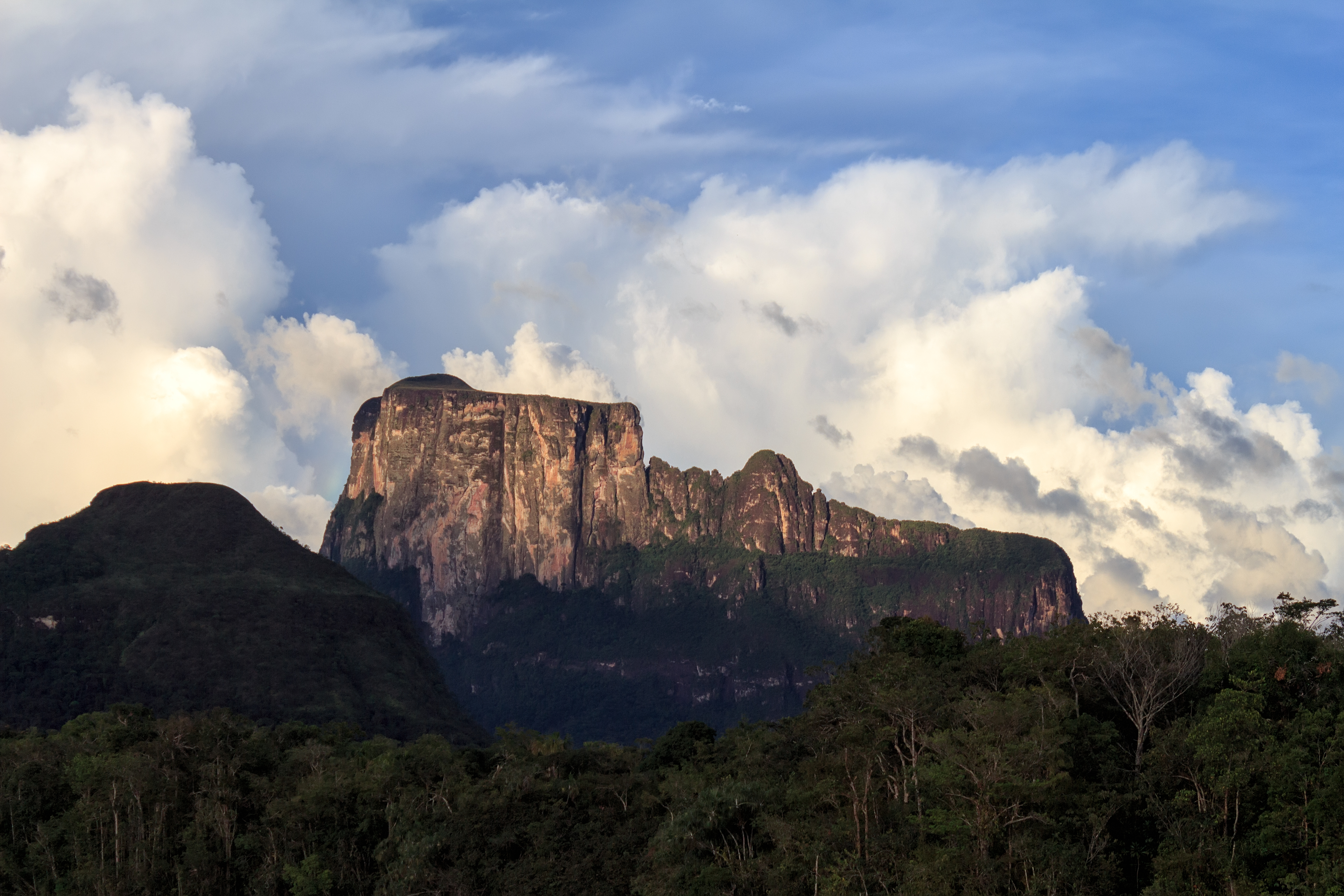
- Tepuy Autana (Kuaymayojo), Amazonas State

- Flag Coat of arms
- Mottoes: Honor y Lealtad; (English: Honor and Loyalty)
- Anthem: Himno del Estado Amazonas
- Location within Venezuela
- Country: Venezuela
- Created: 1994^{[c]}
- Capital: Puerto Ayacucho

Government
  - Body: Legislative Council
  - Governor: Miguel Rodríguez

Area
  - Total: 183,500 km^{2} (70,800 sq mi)
  - Rank: 2nd
- 19.38% of Venezuela

Population (2011 est.)
  - Total: 146,480
  - Rank: 24th
- 0.3% of Venezuela
- Time zone: UTC−4 (VET)
- ISO 3166 code: VE-Z
- Emblematic tree: Caucho (Hevea benthamiana)
- HDI (2019): 0.692; medium · 15th of 24
- Website: Official website
- ^[c]Until this date, Amazonas had the status of Federal Territory.

Amazonas State (Spanish: Estado Amazonas, IPA: [esˈtaðo amaˈsonas]) is one of the 23 states into which Venezuela is divided. It covers nearly a fifth of the area of Venezuela, but has less than 1% of Venezuela's population.

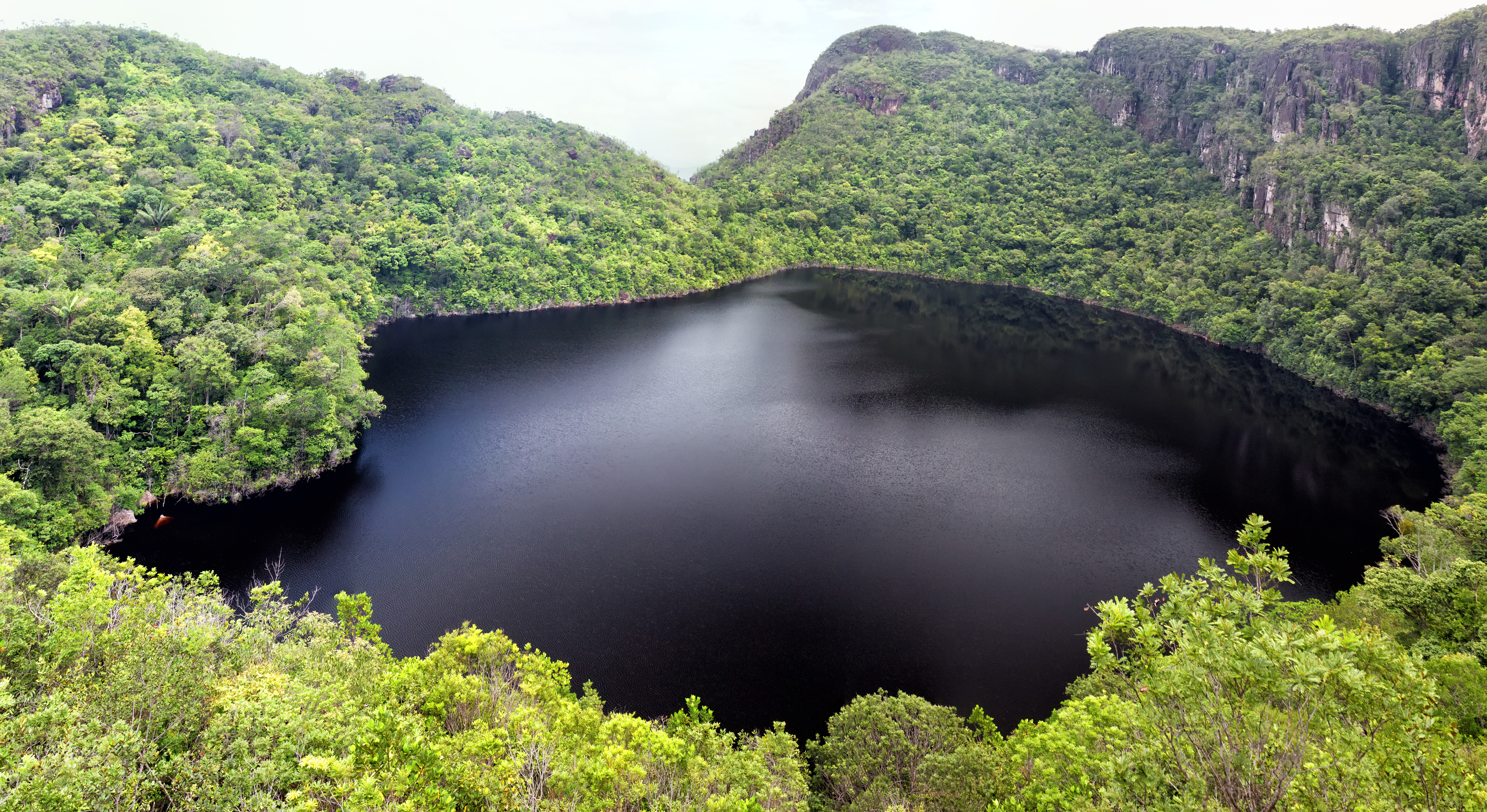
Leopoldo Lake, Amazonas

The state capital is Puerto Ayacucho. The capital until the early 1900s was San Fernando de Atabapo. Although named after the Amazon River, most of the state is drained by the Orinoco River. Amazonas State covers 176,899 km^{2} and, in 2007, had a population of 142,200. Its density is 0.8 inhabitants per km^{2}.

Amazonas has Venezuela's highest proportion of indigenous peoples of Venezuela; these make up only around 1.5% of the population nationwide, but the proportion is nearly 50% in Amazonas.

== Etymology ==
Amazonas is from Amazons, a word of Greek origin that was identified with a race of female warriors who lived in the Asian Sarmacia, beyond the Caucasus.

The name was assigned to the state on June 2, 1856, in honor of the Amazon River, which was discovered by Francisco de Orellana in 1542. He also attributed the name to the river as a result of a legend about a female tribe that tenaciously resisted the Spanish conquerors that reminded him of the Greek legend.

The Amazon River does not pass through the State, but a part of the territory is drained by the Amazon, through the Río Negro (Black River).

== History ==
The territory of the state of Amazonas belonged to the province of Guyana since the time of the Spanish colonization. Some chronicles indicate that the expedition of the Father Acuna was crossing the black river and this way would have discovered the Casiquiare in 1639. In 1682 the Friar Ignacio Fiol establishes the locality of Atures.

Until 1817, the region was made up of the cantons of San Fernando de Atabapo, La Esmeralda and San Carlos de Río Negro and Maroa, in correspondence with first stable population centres founded by the metropolis. Until 1842 it was known as the canton of Río Negro, depending successively on the province of Guayana, department of Orinoco, confederation of the Great Colombia and the State Sovereign of Venezuela.

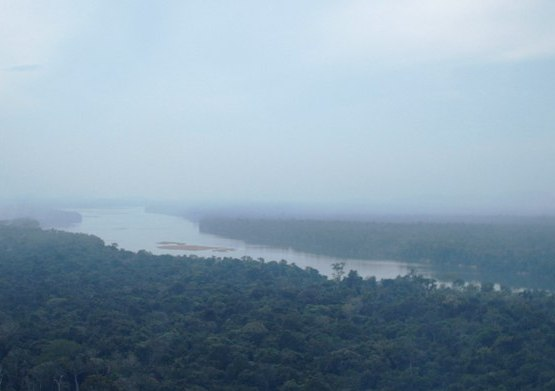
Orinoco River, Near La Esmeralda, Alto Orinoco Municipality, Amazonas

Between 1856 and 1861 it was known as the province of Amazonas of the Republic of Venezuela, this being the first time of its association with the great Amazon region.

The state dates back to the creation of the district of Río Negro, on August 20, 1841, which included the south of the province of Guayana. In 1856 it became the province of Amazonas, declared a federal entity on March 28, 1864, comprising the departments of San Fernando de Atabapo, Maroa and San Carlos.

In 1864 the Federal Territory Amazonas was created, with the capital San Fernando de Atabapo. From 1876 to 1880, the entity maintained the denomination of Amazon territory, but its capital was transferred to Yavita, as a response to the political instability that dominated the region, where a series of warlords associated with the exploitation of the wild rubber were disregarded by national authorities. Then, under the mandate of President Antonio Guzmán Blanco in 1881, it was decided to divide the area into two territories: the Federal Territory Amazonas and the Federal Territory Alto Orinoco. 12 years later it was decided to reunify the territories with the name of Amazonas in 1893 and with its capital in San Fernando de Atabapo.

Between 1880 and 1893, the region was separated in the territories of Alto Orinoco and Amazonas, with capitals in San Fernando of Atabapo and Maroa in the United States of Venezuela.

In 1928 the then president Juan Vicente Gómez decided to move the state capital to the north specifically to the city of Puerto Ayacucho to facilitate connections with Caracas and the rest of the nation.

It continued as Federal Territory Amazonas because it did not meet the minimum population to change its category to State of the Federation according to the old National Constitution. In 1992 its status was changed to State, with the same capital and territory.

== Geography ==
Amazonas belongs to the region of Guayana and is the second largest Venezuelan state in territorial area after Bolivar, although it is very sparsely populated, with most of its population concentrated in the northern part.

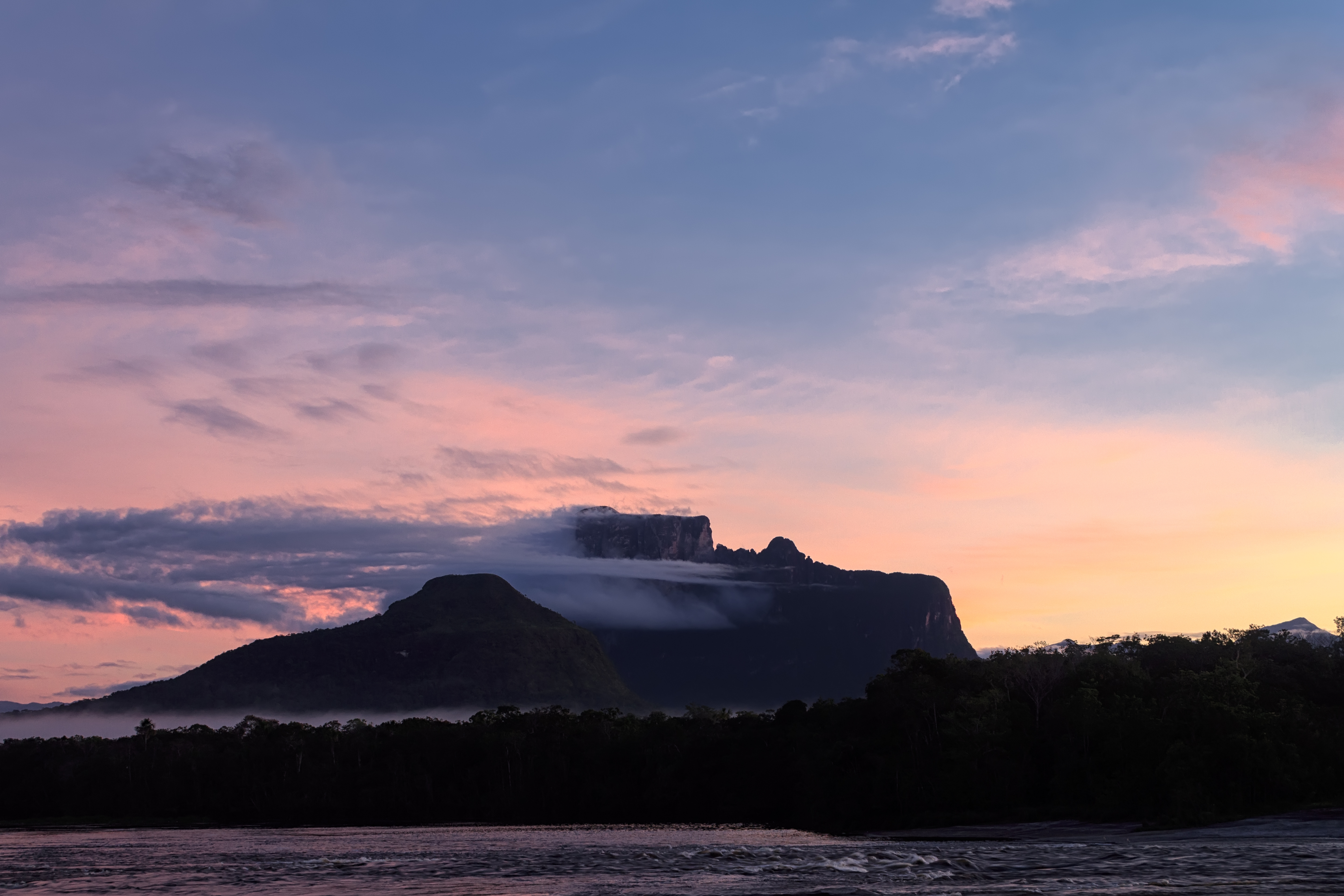
Sunrise at Autana, Venezuelan Amazon

=== Relief ===
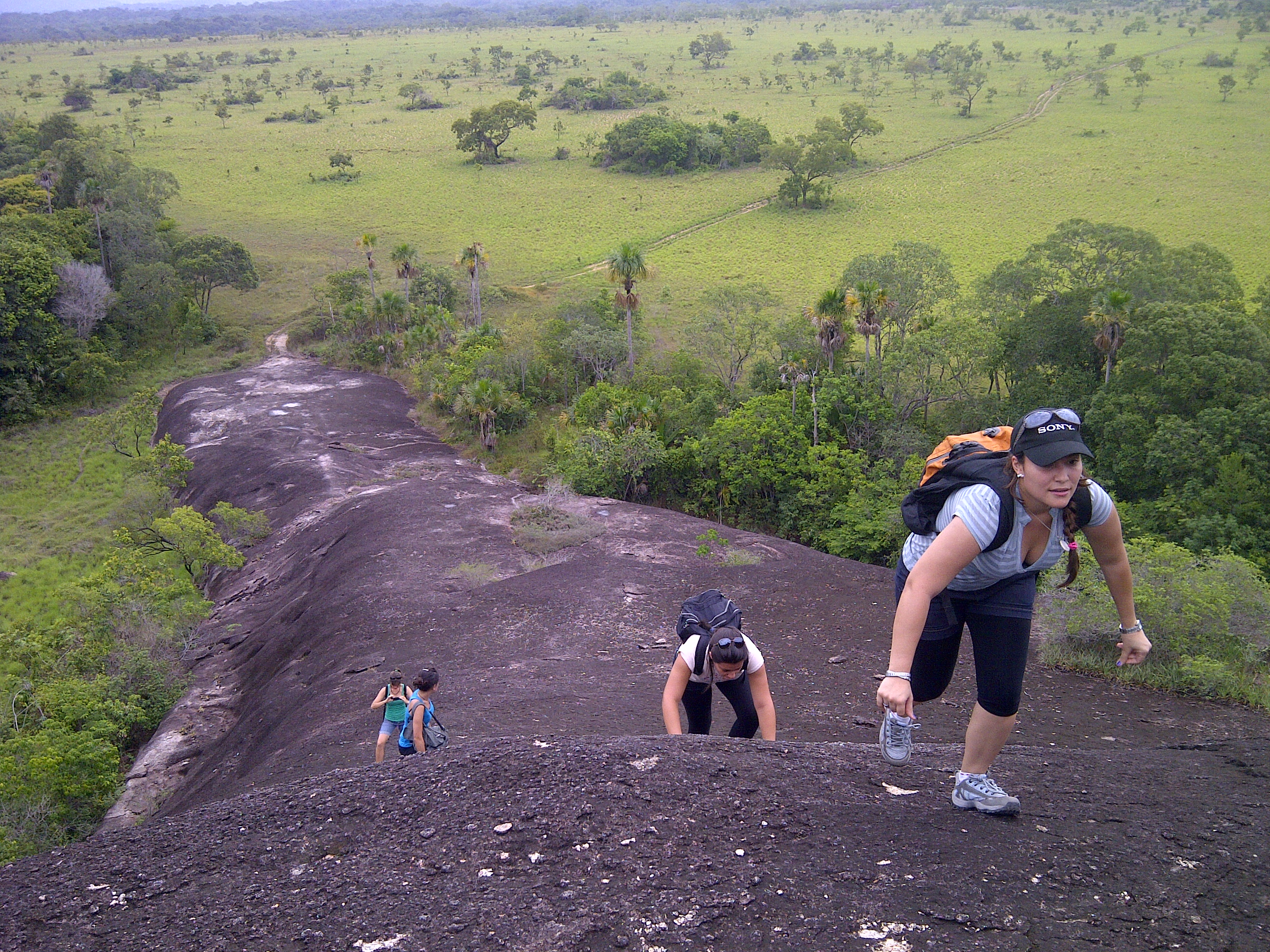
Piedra de la Tortuga Monument in Amazonas.

The entire state of Amazonas is included in the so-called Guiana Shield. Its relief is included from the margins of the Orinoco to the Marahuaca peak at 2,832 metres or 9,291 feet. The highest peak in the state is the Tapirapecó at 2,992 metres or 9,816 feet above sea level, in the Serranía La Neblina National Park on the border with Brazil. The relief of the state is very varied, starting with the plains or savannahs, which range from 100 to 500 metres or 330 to 1,640 feet to continue with the mountains and hills, which abound in the area, except given the western side of the state that for being limited by the rivers Orinoco, Guainía and Negro, obviously run the lowest part of the territory. Indeed, to the north, east and south there are numerous mountain ranges, including Maigualida, Marahuaca, Unturán, Parima, Tapirapecó, La Neblina, Imeri and Aracamuní, among others.

=== Hydrography ===
In this state the main river of Venezuela, the Orinoco, is born in the Delgado Chalbaud hill and after crossing 2,140 kilometres (1,330 mi) it deposits its waters in the Atlantic Ocean. The Orinoco is, in turn, the basin where other important rivers of the region flow, such as the 474-kilometre (295 mi) long Ventuari.

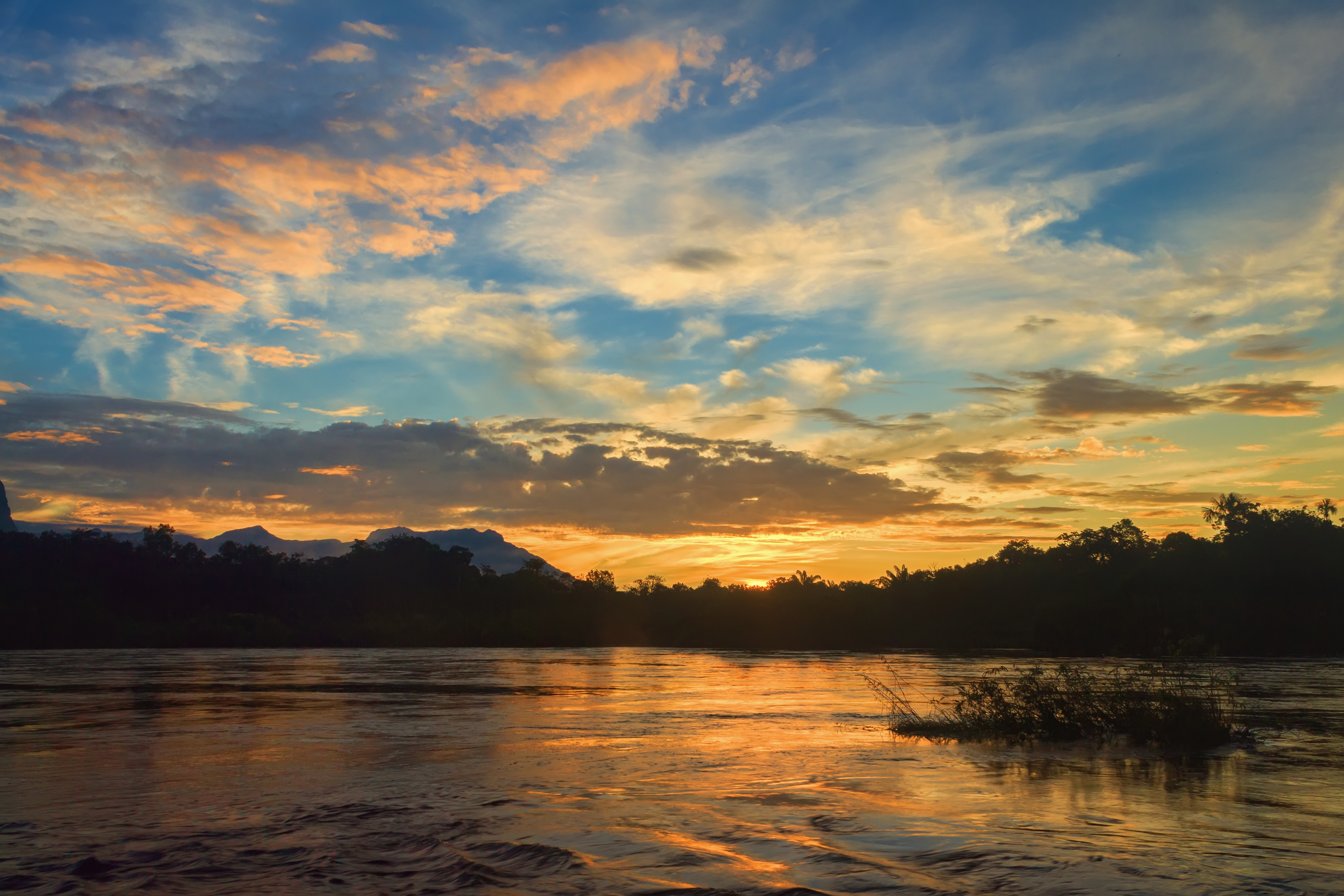
Autana River, Amazonas State

=== Climate ===
The climate of the Amazon State corresponds to the rainy, monsoon and tropical savannah types. Basically there are two seasons, one dry and one rainy. To the south there are no dry months, while to the northwest there are up to four months of drought. In the central and northern areas there is a moderate water deficiency between December and March. Average rainfall exceeds 1,200 millimetres or 50 inches per year. The annual thermal oscillation is minimal (between 1 and 1.5 °C or 1.8 and 2.7 °F) but the daily one is large (more than 15 °C or 27 °F at high altitudes). The temperature of the coolest month is always over 15 °C or 59 °F. The average annual temperature of the Parima station, at an altitude of 810 metres or 2,660 feet, is 22.3 °C or 72.1 °F while that of Tamatama (at 112 metres or 367 feet and the same latitude) is 27 °C or 80.6 °F.

=== Vegetation ===
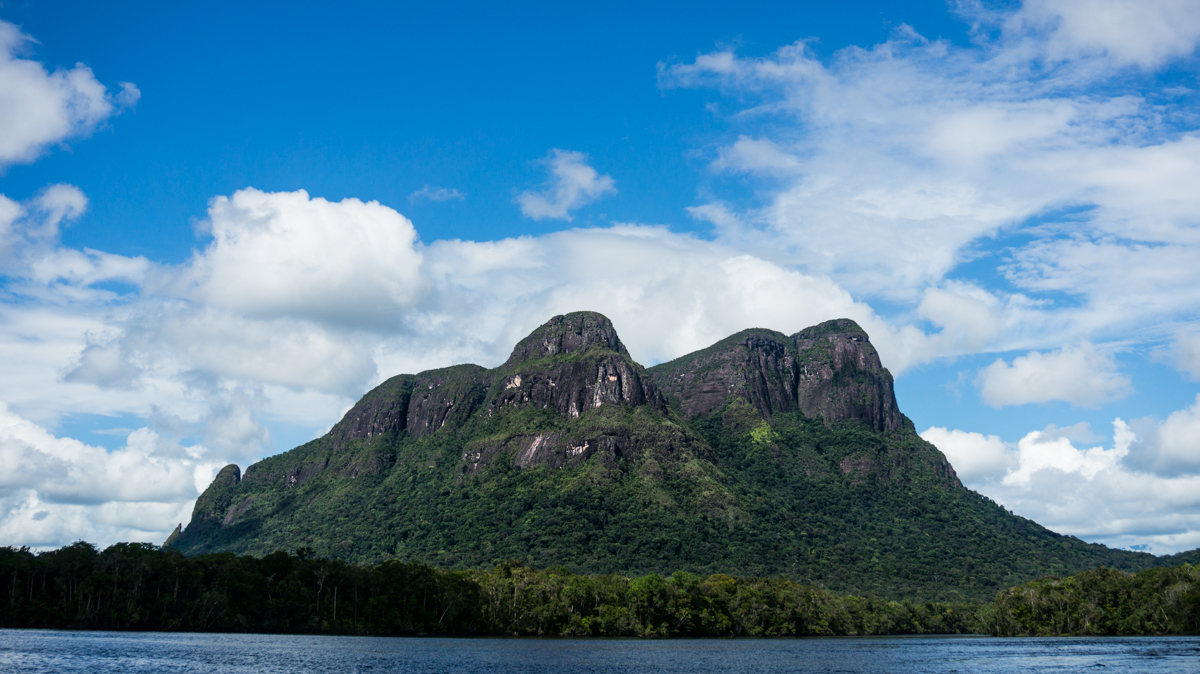
Amazon Rainforest and Wichuj Hill, Amazonas state

A large part of the state of Amazonas is covered by immense forests, so the vegetation due to the high rate of rainfall is typical of the jungle. There are also dry soil savannas and wet soil savannas. Higher up the vegetation becomes scarcer, until the altitude reaches above 2,000 metres or 6,560 feet where it almost disappears completely.

=== Fauna ===
The rich fauna of the region is represented by numerous specimens of mammals, reptiles, fish and birds.

- Mammals: puma, jaguar, tapir, monkey (araguato, marmoset), palm tree bear or anteater (in danger of extinction), fox, etc.
- Reptiles: Orinoco caiman (in danger of extinction), baba, turtle, morrocoy, snakes, anaconda, boa constrictor, rattle, cuaima, mapanare, etc.
- Fish: toad or (Semaprochilodus laticeps), trembler or electric eel, ray, caribbean, piranha, catfish, guabina, etc.
- Birds: eagle, harpy eagle (in danger of extinction), sparrowhawk, macaw (in bright colours: red, green, yellow, orange and blue), catana, woodpecker, curassow, toucan, etc.

== Politics and government ==
The State of Amazonas is only entitled to a representation of 3 deputies in the Venezuelan National Assembly, which is the minimum indicated by the 1999 Constitution since it has very little population despite its large territorial extension. Additionally, it elects a deputy along with other states representing the indigenous peoples for the southern region.

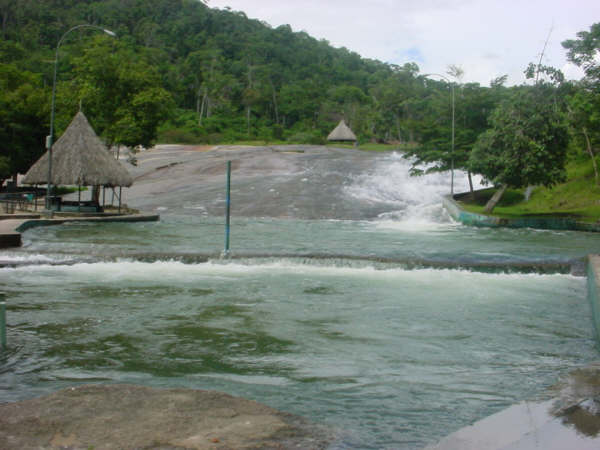
The Tobogán de la Selva, near to Puerto Ayacucho.

The regional movements have considerable strength to the point that in the 2005 parliamentary elections the regional party United Movement of Indigenous Peoples (MUPI) obtained 48% of the votes compared to 44% of the votes of the ruling coalition led by the Movement V Republic (MVR), Homeland for All (PPT), and the regional party United Multiethnic Peoples of the Amazon (PUAMA) considered until then the first regional force. One deputy was elected by MUPI, one by PUAMA and one by the PPT (together with the MVR-UVE).

The state is autonomous and equal politically, it organizes its administration and public powers through the Constitution of the State of Amazonas, which was adopted in 2002. The Constitution can be subject to reform or amendment, they are proposed by the Legislative Power, and to be approved, they need the favorable votes of at least 60% of the State Legislative Council, and by 10% or more of the electoral population of Amazonas.

Like the other 23 federal entities of Venezuela, the State maintains its own police force, which is supported and complemented by the National Police and the Venezuelan National Guard.

== Municipalities and municipal seats ==
Municipality	Capital	Area (km^{2})	Population	Map
Alto Orinoco Municipality	La Esmeralda	49,217 km^{2}	12,687 (2011)	
Atabapo Municipality	San Fernando de Atabapo	25,900 km^{2}	9,169 (2011)	
Atures Municipality	Puerto Ayacucho	4,500 km^{2}	104,228 (2011)	
Autana Municipality	Isla Ratón	12,291 km^{2}	8,352 (2011)	
Manapiare Municipality	San Juan de Manapiare	33,100 km^{2}	7,715 (2011)	
Maroa Municipality	Maroa	14,250 km^{2}	2,029 (2011)	
Río Negro Municipality	San Carlos de Río Negro	39,150 km^{2}	2,300 (2011)	

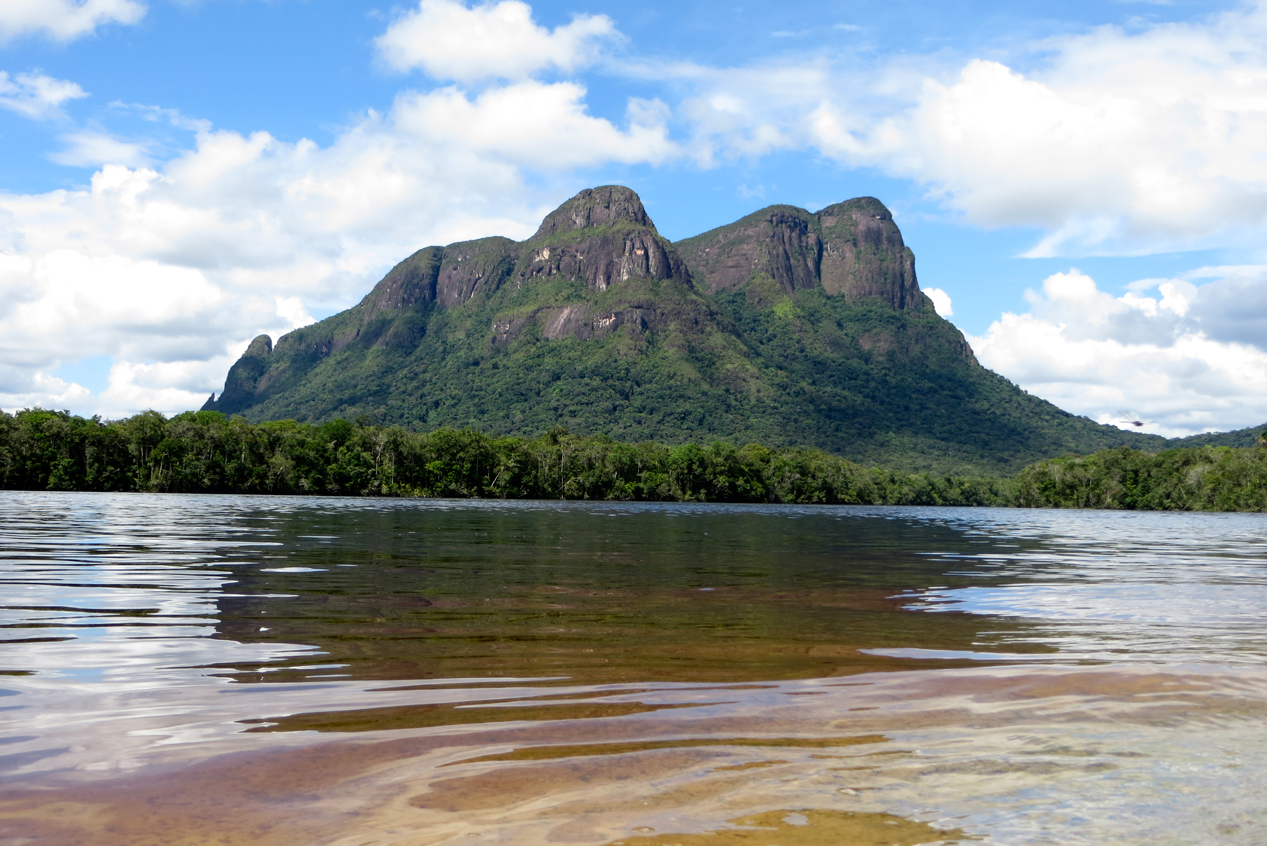
Cerro Wichuj in Amazonas, Venezuela.

== Demographics ==
Historical population
Year	Pop.	±% p.a.
1873	528	—
1881	4,165	+29.46%
1891	8,015	+6.76%
1920	3,298	−3.02%
1926	9,776	+19.85%
1936	1,715	−15.97%
1941	3,728	+16.80%
1950	10,582	+12.29%
1961	11,757	+0.96%
1971	21,696	+6.32%
1981	45,667	+7.73%
1990	55,717	+2.23%
2001	70,464	+2.16%
2011	146,480	+7.59%
Source: "XIV CENSO NACIONAL DE POBLACIÓN Y VIVIENDA – Resultados por Entidad Federal y Municipio del Estado Amazonas" (PDF). Instituto Nacional de Estadística.

=== Race and ethnicity ===
According to the 2011 Census, the racial composition of the population was:

Racial composition	Population	%
Mestizo	—N/a	60.6
White	54,102	34.4
Black	6,291	4.1
Other race	—N/a	0.9

== Economy ==
Its economic activity is limited, most agricultural products are consumed locally and in certain areas the State is in deficit, livestock and agriculture is extensive, these activities along with trade are the main sources of employment in the region. The use of the extensive river network allows commercial development. Ecological tourism is in full development in spite of the potential represented by its natural landscapes, it also lacks adequate tourist infrastructure for a high number of visitors. There are cultural features of valuable specificity and other unique elements.

It is one of the richest Venezuelan states in terms of natural resources, most of which are currently unexploited. There are problems of deforestation in the border areas with Brazil.

== Transport ==
Being a primarily jungle region, the state of Amazonas has mostly precarious land routes, of which only 33.63% are paved. The main communication routes are air and waterways, although in the case of waterways, their navigation will depend on the rainy and dry seasons that characterize this region, since in many cases river traffic will be problematic in times of drought.

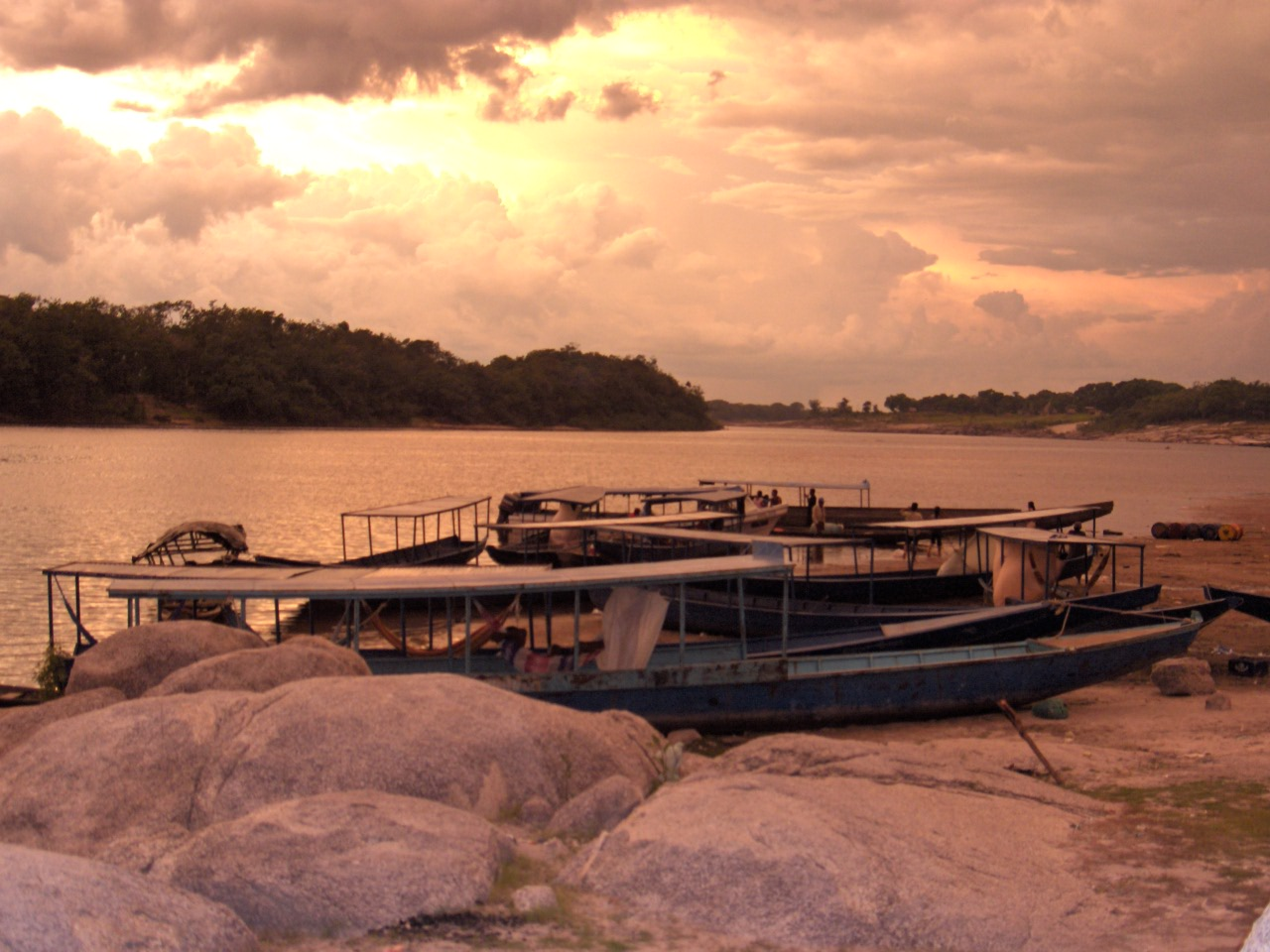
San Fernando de Atabapo Port

There is only one domestic airport in the state. The others are for private or military use. There are also landing strips in Cacurí, la Esmeralda, Ocamo, Kamariapó, San Juan de Manapiare, Santa Bárbara, Yaví, Yutajé and San Carlos de Río Negro.

== Culture ==
The indigenous population represents about 45% of the state's population. The ethnological culture of the state of Amazonas is the largest in the country, possessing 20 different ethnicities, differentiated by their own languages and customs. In Amazonas, indigenous languages of the Arawaka, Caribbean, Yanomami families are spoken or represent isolated languages without any known relationship to others.

The Yanomami represent 26% of the indigenous population of the state. They are located in the Upper Orinoco and extend into Guyana and Brazil. Their settlements are located around "Shaponos", which can be the river or the mountain where the conuco is found to ensure their food. Among their most interesting customs is that of incinerating their dead, and then with the ashes, making a drink that, according to their customs, would bring them all the vitality of the deceased. They are small in stature; adult women do not exceed 1.50 m, and walk completely naked except for a small loincloth. Among the most common facial ornaments is that of a stick that pierces the nasal septum of women, and the haircut characteristic of the ethnicity. While indigenous ethnicities, mostly are in extinction, the Yanomamis remain the largest indigenous people of the Amazon.

The Maquiritares or Yekuanas, of the Caribbean family, live in the East and Northeast of the state. The Piaroa represent 22% of the indigenous population. The Guahibos make up 21% of the state's indigenous population.

=== Handicrafts ===
Basketwork or hard fabrics: they are made in different shapes, sizes and colours. Its manufacture is based on leaves from different types of palms: moriche, cumare, seje, cucurito, chiquichique, etc. All decoration has its meaning, related to the life of the users, its sacredness, its mythology.

Soft fabrics: hammocks, hammocks, bags, baby carriers, dresses, guaiacs and their looms; pottery or ceramics; wood carvings; body decorations; hunting and fishing instruments; musical instruments; etc.

Pottery: Archaeological sites of this artistic manifestation dating from pre-Hispanic times have been found in the regions of Manapiare (Corobal), Atabapo (Nericagua), on islands in the Orinoco River, in the Lower Orinoco (Barrancas and Saladero), in Culebra, very close to Puerto Ayacucho and in other places.

The musical instruments: they are another indigenous artisan expression of the Amazon State of which there are more than 100 types.

The corporal adornments: Among these are the pintaderas, made in a circular or rectangular piece of wood carved with different designs according to their use and function.

Wooden carvings: benches (made in the shape of animals), domestic utensils, ritual objects, bongos and curiaras, canaletes, pylons, etc.

=== Folklore ===
Among the extensive and varied folklore of the state are samples of 62 ethnic groups, among which are: Yanomami, Puahito, Piaroa, Uekuana, Yeral Curripaco, Bare, Baniva, Puinave, Piapoco, Hoti, Warequena, Yaborana. The folkloric manifestations are rich in native dances and songs, with music played with typical wind and percussion instruments.

Among the indigenous dances is the traditional Yekuana dance. As for musical instruments, there is the use of the morrocoy shell and bamboo flutes.

The different ethnic groups have the custom of holding a Warime14 festival every three years; this festival is held to celebrate both a great harvest and new marriages within the community.

Also, on the occasion of the arrival of the rains during the months of May, June and July, indigenous dances are performed in Puerto Ayacucho and San Fernando de Atabapo.

=== Gastronomy ===
In Puerto Ayacucho and in the interior of the state there are restaurants where the best dishes of the area are served: turtle prepared in its carapace, tapir, lapa; also fish of the finest qualities, such as morocoto, curbina, palometa, bocón, caribe, guabina, pavón and lau lau; among the birds: paují, wild duck, turkey and chicken.

Different types of bread are also made: if the manioc from the yucca is not enough, one can try the roasted or fried green banana. The mañoco is made with bitter yucca, in whose processing certain native implements are used such as sebucan, ray and budare.

In Amazonas, fruits such as pijiguao, tupiro, cocura, moriche, copoazú, curuba, manaca, pineapples and ceje are grown; the latter is harvested throughout the state, especially in the valleys of the Manapire, Casiquiare, Sipapo, Cuao and Ventuari rivers; from it, ceje oil is extracted, which has medicinal properties.

== Sports ==
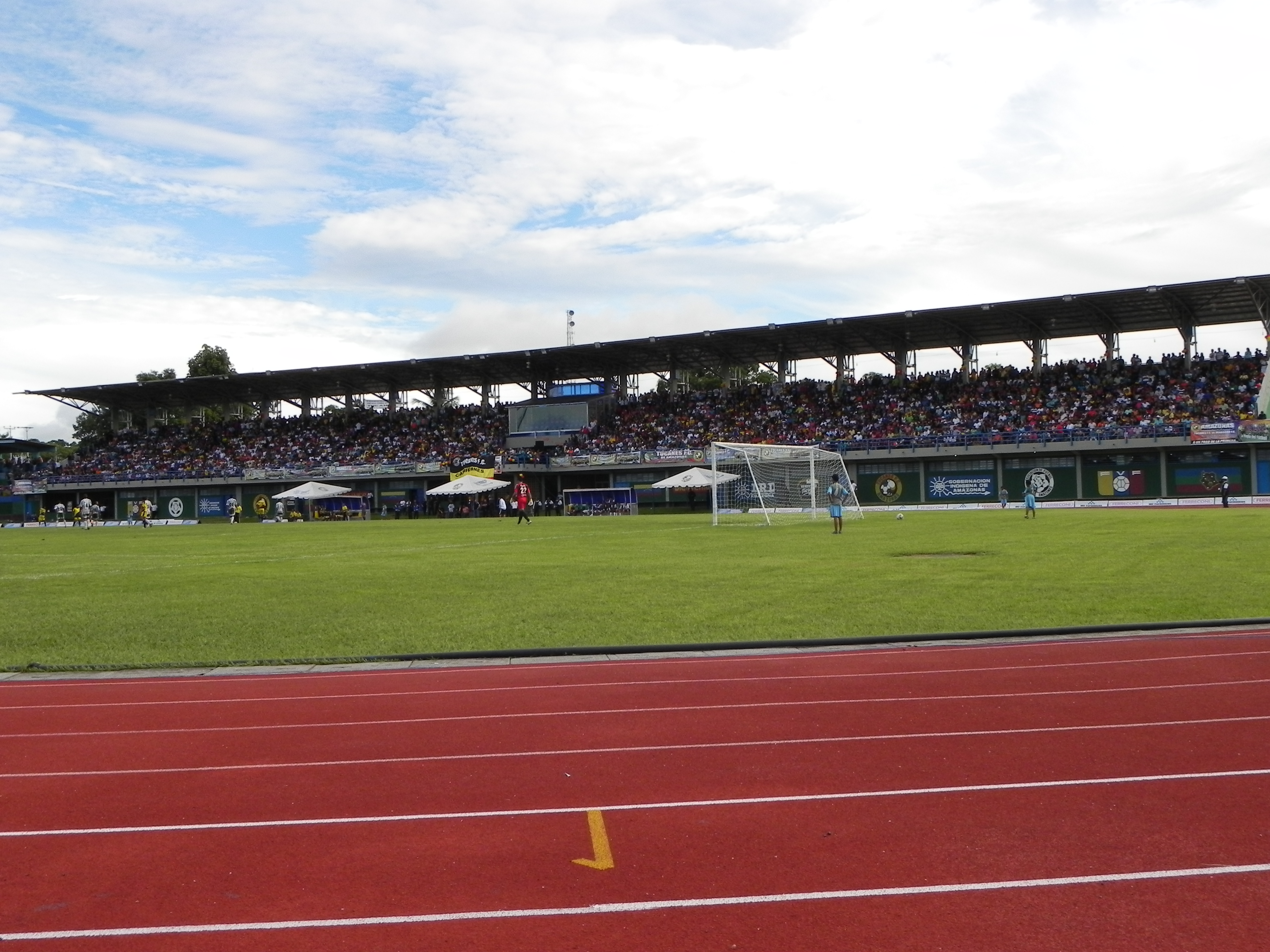
Antonio José de Sucre Stadium, Amazonas State

Tucanes de Amazonas Fútbol Club was a soccer team belonging to the Second Division of Venezuela. It was founded in 2008, and played its home games at the Antonio José de Sucre Stadium in Puerto Ayacucho, Venezuela.

In 2018, Tucanes FC disappears for good due to disagreements in its board of directors and a new third division currency called "Amazonas Futbol Club" is created, which is sponsored by the regional government and takes over the Antonio José de Sucre Stadium in the city of Puerto Ayacucho.

== Gallery ==
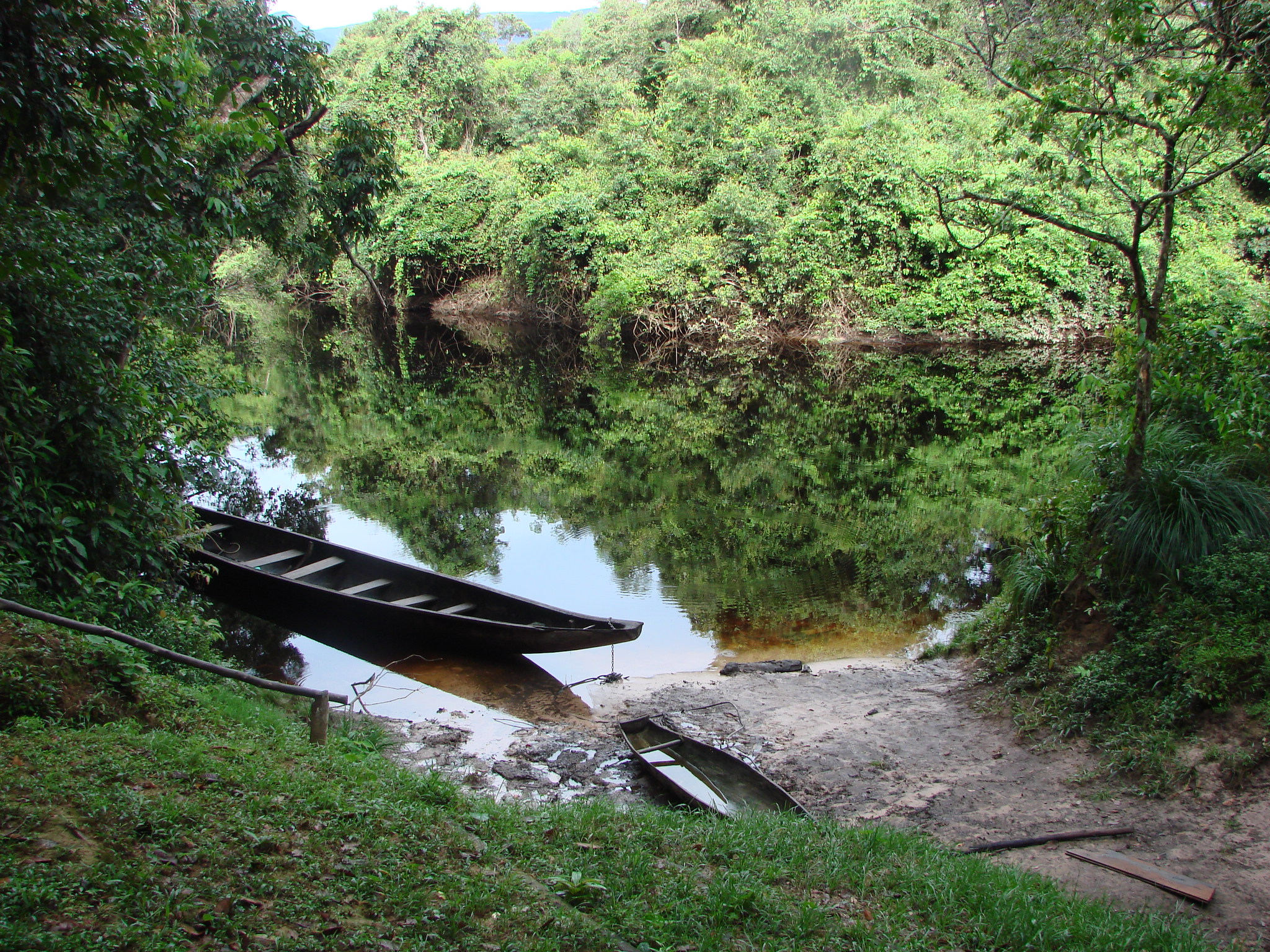
A canoe (canoa), which serves as a transport for many locals and visitors

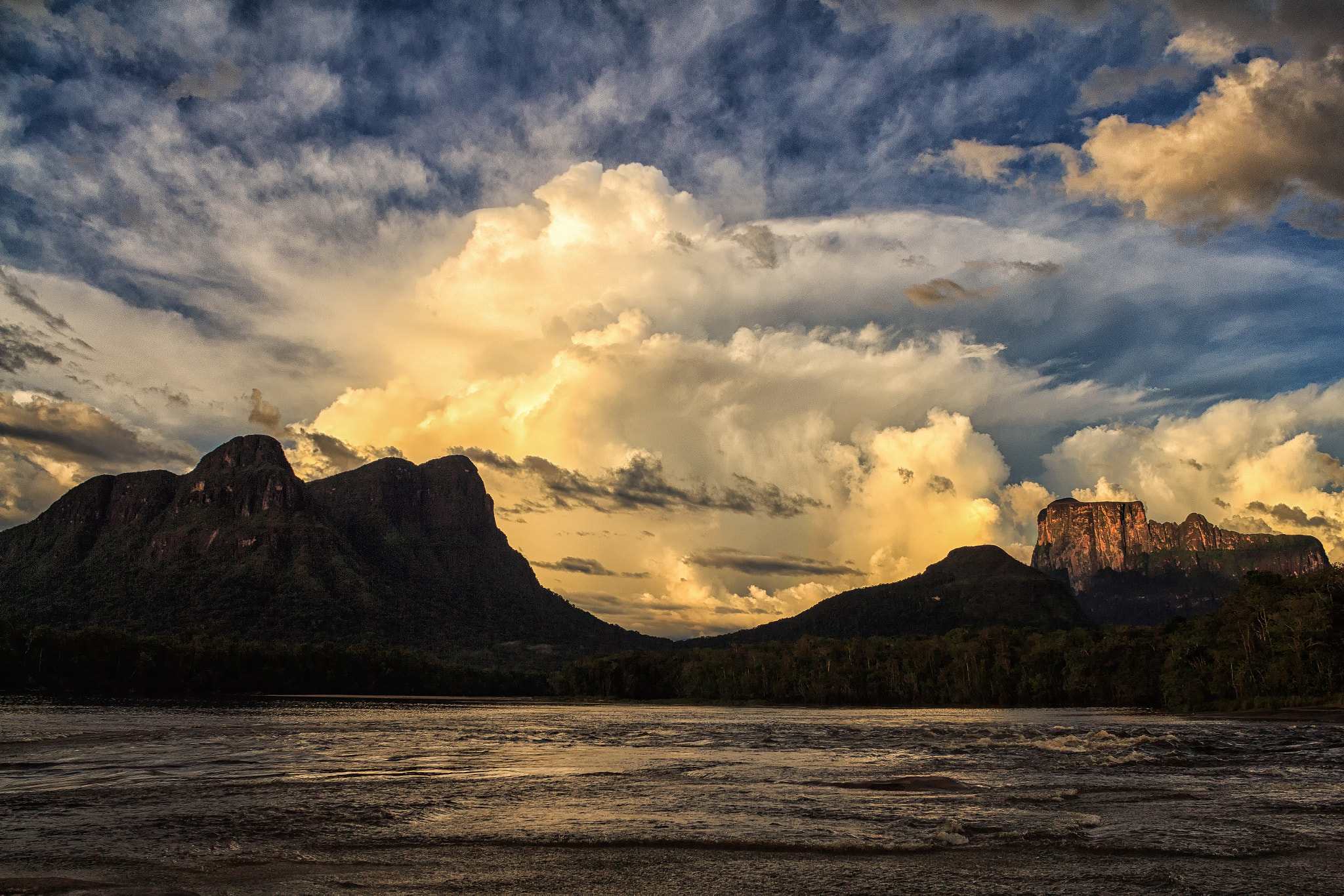
Cerro Wichuj Uripikay and Kuaymayojo Autana

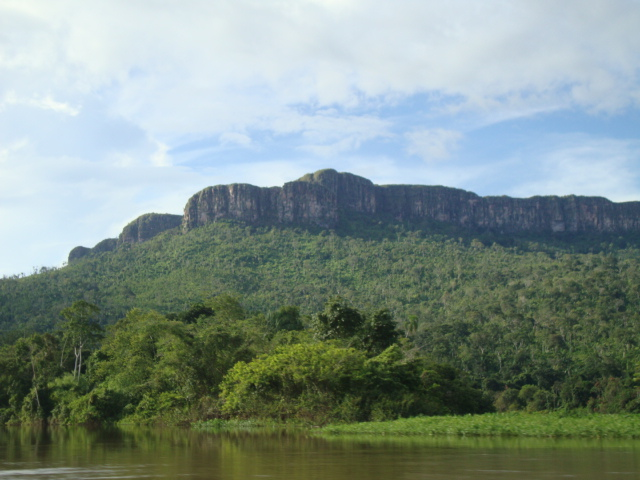
Ocamo River

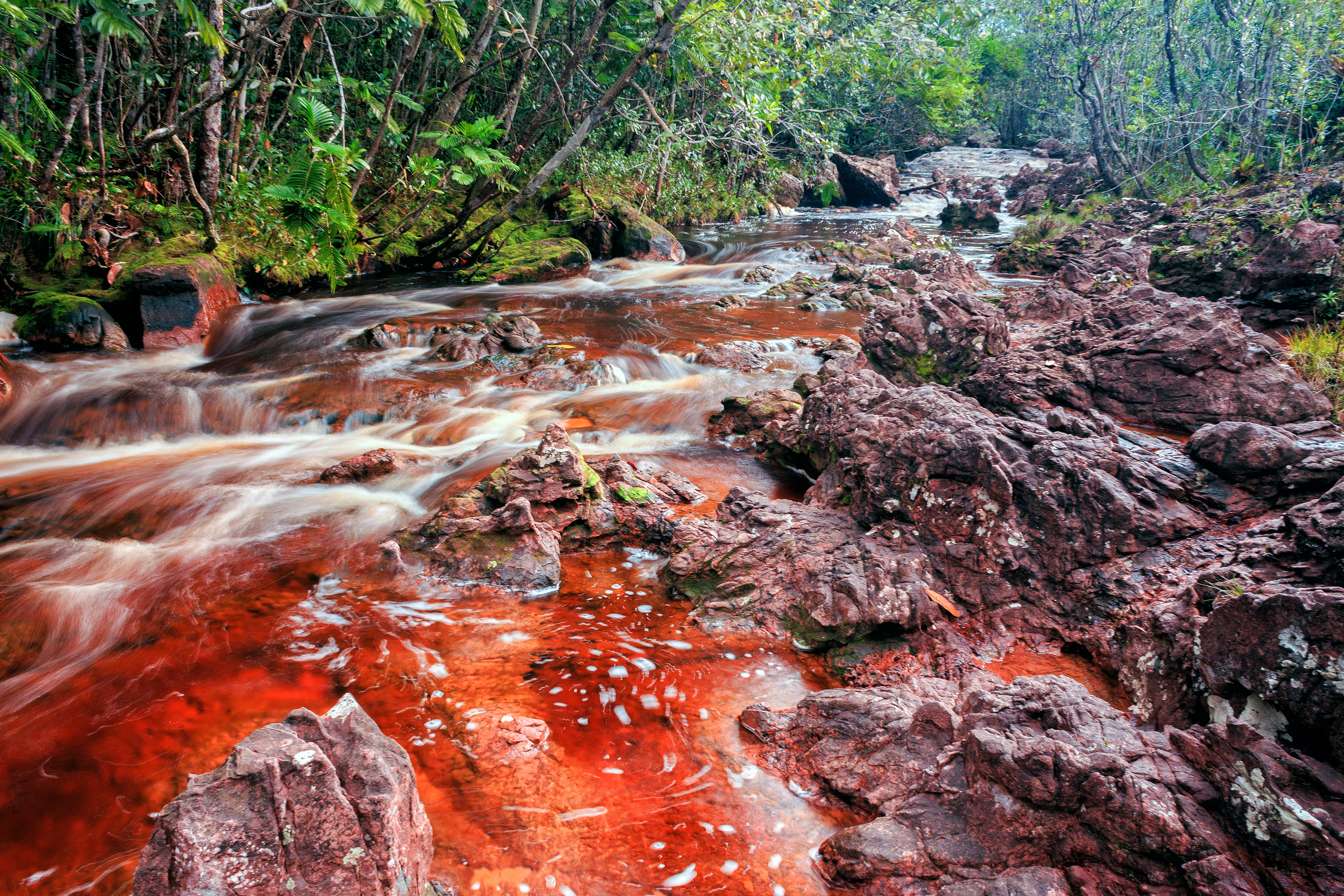
Zorro River

== See also ==
- Amazonas Department, Colombia
- Amazonas State, Brazil
- States of Venezuela
