= Venezuelans of European descent =

White Venezuelans
Venezolanos blancos (Spanish)
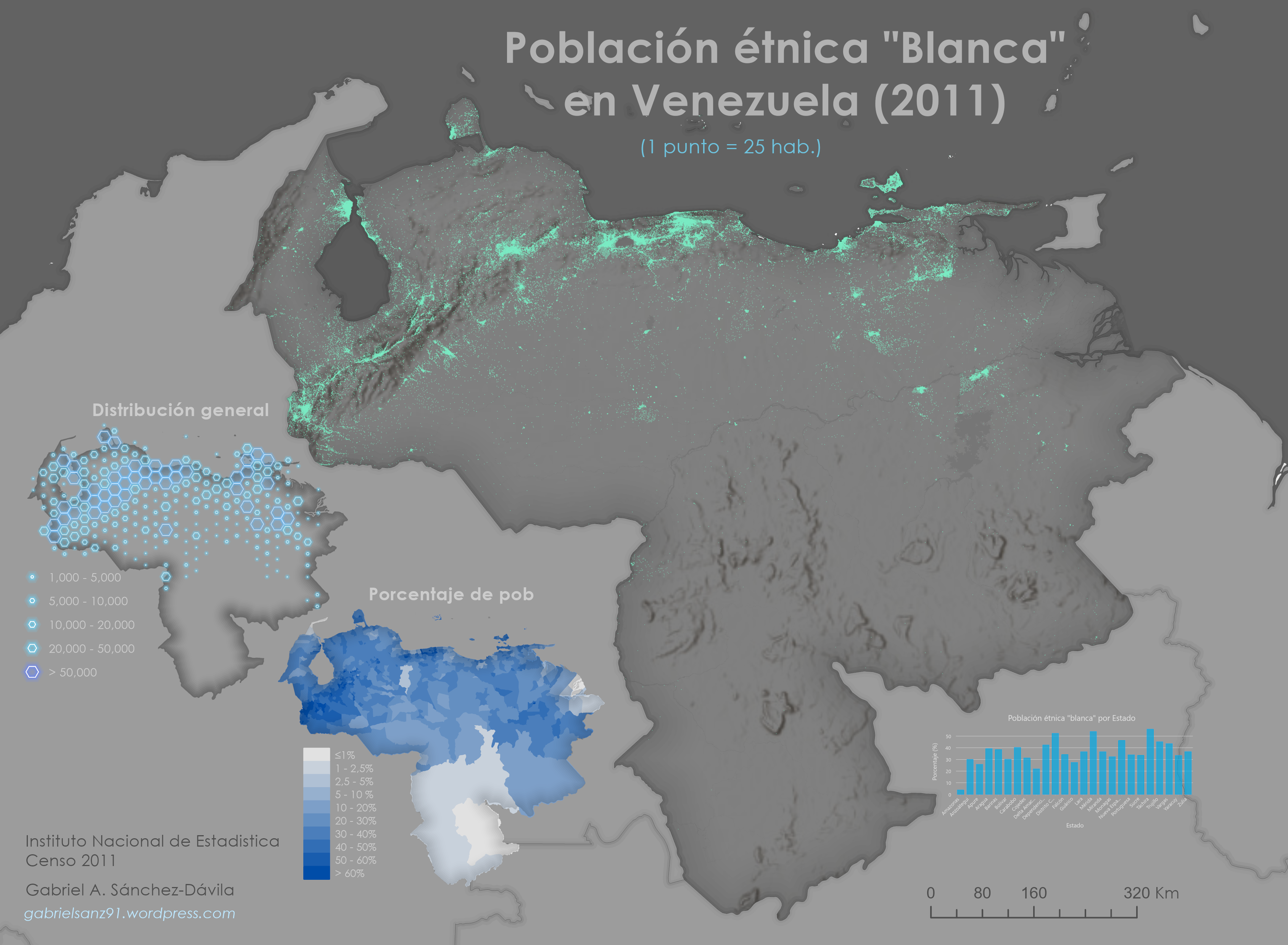

Total population
- White ancestry predominates 13,169,949 (2011 census); 43.6% of the Venezuelan population. ≈6.4 million (Latinobarómetro 2024) 22.4% of Venezuelan respondents self-identified as white

Regions with significant populations
- Entire country; highest percents found in Andean, Central, Capital region and major urban-conglomerations.

Languages
- Venezuelan Spanish small minorities speak Italian, Catalan, Basque, Galician, Valencian, Aragonese, Occitan, Asturleonese, Portuguese, English, French, Polish, Ukrainian, Russian, Hungarian, Yiddish, and Alemán Coloniero, a dialect of German

Religion
- Christianity

Related ethnic groups
- Moreno Venezuelans, Spanish Venezuelans, Italo-Venezuelans, Portuguese Venezuelans, German Venezuelans, Ukrainian Venezuelans, Russian Venezuelans, Polish Venezuelans, Hungarian Venezuelans, Jewish Venezuelans, White Colombians, White Latin Americans

European Venezuelans (Spanish: Venezolanos europeos), also known as White Venezuelans (Spanish: Venezolanos blancos) are Venezuelans who self-identify in the national census as white, tracing their heritage to European ethnic groups. According to the official census report, although "white" literally involves external caucasoid features such as fair skin, hair, and eyes, among others, the term "white" has been used in different ways in different historical periods and places, and so its precise definition is somewhat confusing.

According to the 2011 National Population and Housing Census, 43.6% of the population identified themselves as white people. A genomic study shows that about 61.5% of the Venezuelan gene pool has European ancestry. Among the Latin American and Caribbean countries in the study (Argentina, Bahamas, Brazil, Chile, Costa Rica, Colombia, El Salvador, Ecuador, Jamaica, Mexico, Peru, Puerto Rico, and Venezuela), Brazil, Venezuela, and Argentina exhibit the highest European contribution. Meanwhile another study published on Scielo concluded that the average Venezuelan has 40% European admixture.

The ancestry of European Venezuelans is primarily Spanish, Portuguese, and Italian.

Other ancestries of European Venezuelans are: Germans, Poles, Greeks, and other minorities.

== History ==
Italian explorer Christopher Columbus arrived in the Venezuela region in 1498. European explorers named Venezuela ("Little Venice") after observing local indigenous houses on stilts over water. During the first quarter-century of contact, the Europeans limited themselves to slave hunting and pearlfishing on the northeastern coast; the first permanent Spanish settlement in Venezuela, Cumaná, was not made until 1523.

European colonization of Venezuela commenced with the arrival of the Spanish in the late 15th century, with settlers predominantly hailing from regions such as Andalusia, Galicia, the Basque Country, and the Canary Islands. The influence of the Canary Islands on Venezuelan culture and customs has been particularly significant, earning Venezuela the occasional nickname "the eighth island of the Canary archipelago".

Throughout the colonial period, Spanish authorities discouraged non-Spanish migration to safeguard colonial territories from rival European claims, although exceptions existed. The influx of Germans began in the early 16th century, with King Carlos I granting colonization privileges to German families to offset certain debts. This led to the renaming of the Province of Venezuela as Klein-Venedig, with its capital established as Neu-Augsburg (now Coro), and the founding of Neu-Nürnberg (now Maracaibo), the country's second-largest city. In 1542, the Dutch seized control of the Araya peninsula for its lucrative salt flats, subsequently expanding their presence to other coastal areas such as Falcón, Carabobo, and Zulia due to economic ties with the nearby Netherlands Antilles. Until deep into the 19th century, the now Venezuelan islands of Aves, the Aves archipelago, Los Roques and La Orchila were also considered by the Dutch government to be part of the Dutch West Indies.

During the emergence of the independence movements in the Americas, Venezuela experienced a notable influx of White Dominicans. This surge in migration was largely prompted by a genocide perpetrated by Afro-descendant Haitians following the capture of Hispaniola. As Venezuela pursued independence, it witnessed a significant arrival of Italian immigrants seeking better opportunities, with migration beginning in 1814 and intensifying around 1870 during Italy's unification. These Italian immigrants primarily concentrated in agricultural regions, particularly focusing on coffee and cocoa cultivation in the Andean and the Coastal Range area of the country. Concurrently, volunteers from England, Scotland, and Ireland formed the "British Legion", actively engaging in the War of Independence, leaving a lasting impact and contributing to the enduring presence of British descendants in Venezuela.

Following independence, Venezuela faced challenges attracting immigrants due to economic stagnation and internal conflicts. Despite this, small groups of French settlers, particularly Corsicans, established themselves along the coast of the Paria Peninsula, contributing significantly to the cocoa industry. Additionally, Italians were notably present in the Andean region, while German immigrants formed communities such as Colonia Tovar in the center-north, they also played vital roles in commerce, particularly in Maracaibo's retail sector and informal banking systems. Towards the late 19th century, White Americans and White Canadians relocated to Venezuela, primarily as evangelical missionaries representing various Protestant denominations, along with engineers drawn by the burgeoning oil industry.

After 1935, Venezuela underwent a period of economic and social advancement with the discovery of oil, positioning itself as an attractive destination for immigrants. From 1940 to 1961, an estimated 900,000 European immigrants arrived in Venezuela, following the Second World War, the Francoist dictatorship and the policies of the governments of the Warsaw Pact. Among them, Spanish, Italian, and Portuguese migrants constituted the majority, while smaller numbers included Germans, French, Swiss, Poles, Greeks, Czechs, Russians, Ukrainians, Serbs, Nordics, Romanians, Slovenes, Croats, Belgians, Austrians and Hungarians.

During the 1970s and 1980s, Southern Cone nations like Argentina and Uruguay with a predominantly Spanish and Italian-descents population, were plagued by oppressive dictatorships. Consequently, many individuals from these countries sought refuge in Venezuela, attracted by the promise of safety and stability. Additionally, Venezuela became a destination for other European Latin Americans communities, including Colombians, Chileans, Dominicans, Brazilians, Cubans, and others, fleeing economic struggles, political unrest, and autocratic regimes in their homelands.

== Census ==
Around 42-43% of the population are identified as white Venezuelan although most have Native American and African mixtures. The highest concentrations, ranging from 65 to 80%, are found in the Venezuelan Andes (Mérida, San Cristóbal, Tovar, Valera, and numerous others towns), the Coastal Range (Eastern Caracas, San Antonio de Los Altos, El Junko, Colonia Tovar, among others) and areas of the north-eastern Caribbean coast (Lechería, Porlamar, Pampatar, Araya Peninsula).

Census data reveals that in major urban areas like Maracaibo, Valencia, Maracay, Barquisimeto, Ciudad Guayana, Puerto La Cruz, among others, several districts or parishes boast "white" majorities exceeding 50%. These areas typically align with medium to higher socioeconomic levels, resembling Latin American cities of European descent such as Montevideo and Buenos Aires. Conversely, regions like Amazonas state, Orinoco Delta, and Alta Guajira exhibit minimal white presence, often less than 1% of the local population.

== Geographic distribution ==
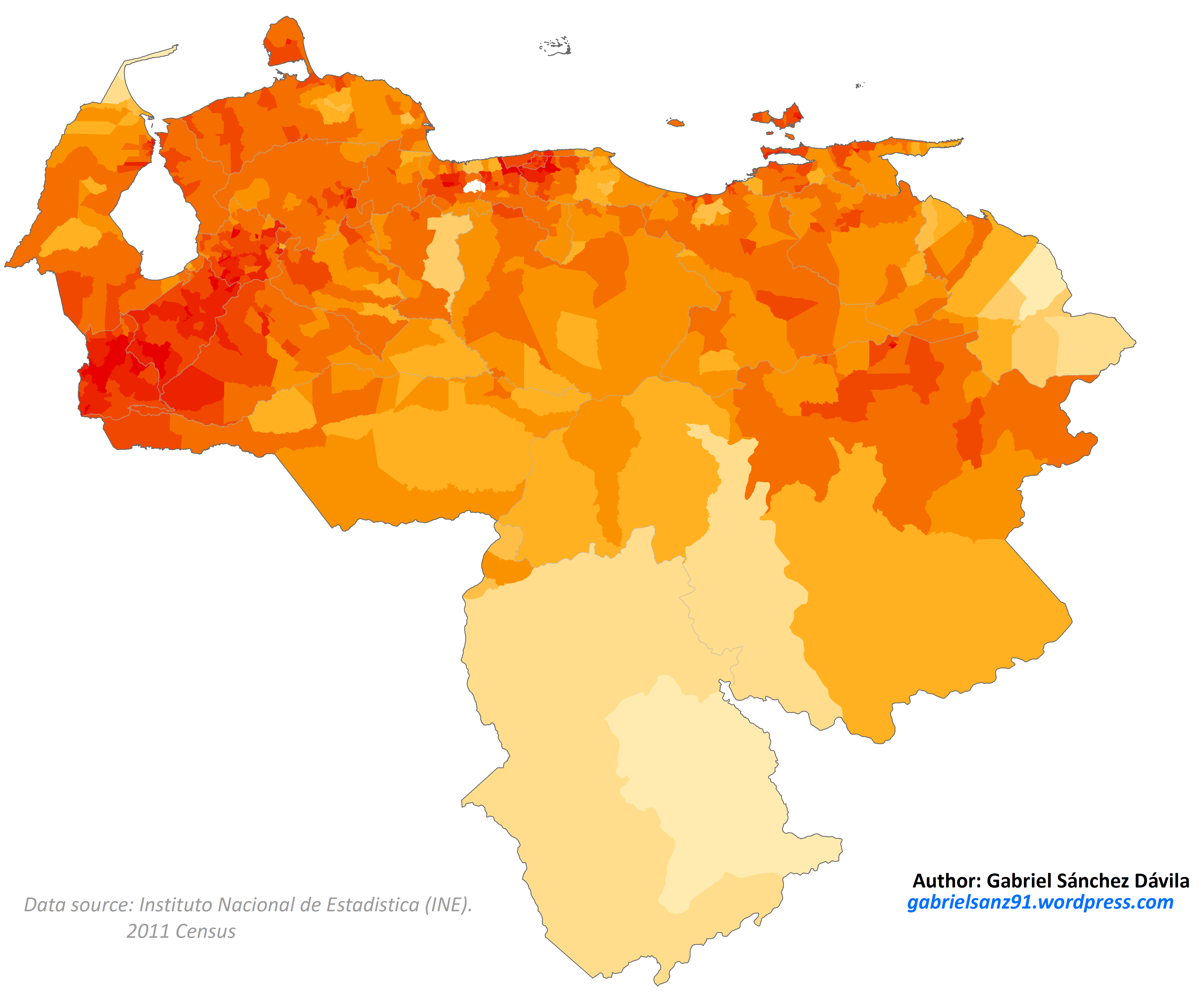
Distribution of Venezuelans of European descent (2011)

=== White Venezuelan population by state ===
The following is a sortable table of the white Venezuelan proportion of the population in each Venezuelan state, according to the 2011 Census data.

Rank (by %)	State	White population (2011)	white (%)
1	Táchira	743,013	58.8%
2	Mérida	479,021	53.7%
3	Capital District	1,079,892	51.2%
4	Trujillo	369,961	48.3%
5	Nueva Esparta	217,828	47.1%
6	Zulia	1,799,760	46.3%
7	Miranda	1,387,265	45.8%
8	Vargas	153,252	44.7%
9	Aragua	763,351	43.4%
10	Carabobo	1,010,138	42.7%
11	Barinas	344,265	41.5%
12	Lara	800,225	41.9%
13	Anzoátegui	629,802	40.0%
14	Bolívar	646,059	39.2%
15	Falcón	375,823	38.9%
16	Monagas	359,473	38.8%
17	Sucre	375,688	38.5%
18	Portuguesa	348,745	37.0%
19	Delta Amacuro	62,457	36.4%
20	Cojedes	115,437	35.6%
21	Yaracuy	229,542	35.5%
22	Amazonas	54,102	34.4%
23	Guárico	264,036	32.9%
24	Apure	157,193	30.2%

=== Percentage of white Venezuelans in municipalities ===
The top 20 communities (municipalities) with the highest percentage of White Venezuelans according to the 2011 Census:

1. Chacao (Metropolitan District of Caracas) 72.20%
2. Umuquena (San Judas Tadeo), Táchira 71.80%
3. Cordero (Andrés Bello), Táchira 70.11%
4. Lechería (Diego Bautista), Anzoátegui 70.10%
5. El Hatillo (Metropolitan District of Caracas) 68.80%
6. San Antonio de Los Altos (Los Salias), Miranda 66.90%
7. Baruta (Metropolitan District of Caracas) 66.40%
8. Canaguá (Arzobispo Chacón), Mérida and Lobatera (Lobatera), Táchira 65.50%
9. La Grita (Jáuregui), Táchira 64.70%
10. San Cristóbal, Táchira 64.50%
11. El Junko (Metropolitan District of Caracas) 63.20%
12. Táriba, Táchira 62.80%
13. Michelena, Táchira 62.50
14. Palmira (Guásimos), Táchira 62.30%
15. Seboruco (Seboruco), Táchira 61.90%
16. Pueblo Llano, Mérida 61.30
17. Tovar, Mérida 60.90%
18. Colonia Tovar (Tovar), Aragua 60.80%
19. Capacho Nuevo (Independencia), Táchira 60.20%
20. El Cobre (José María Vargas), Táchira 60.00%

=== Density of white Venezuelans in municipalities ===
The top 20 communities (municipalities) by population density (per km2) of white Venezuelans, according to the 2011 Census:

1. Chacao (Metropolitan District of Caracas) 3,962.69
2. Santa Rita (Francisco Linares Alcántara), Aragua 2,604.25
3. Carlos Soublette, Vargas 2,506.08
4. Capital District (Metropolitan District of Caracas) 2,493.38
5. Baruta (Metropolitan District of Caracas) 2,479.77
6. Sucre (Metropolitan District of Caracas) 1,967.07
7. Maracaibo, Zulia 1,835.49
8. Lechería (Diego Bautista), Anzoátegui 1,668.23
9. Porlamar (Mariño), Nueva Esparta 1,176.69
10. San Francisco, Zulia 1,110.25
11. Los Guayos, Carabobo 1,107.78
12. Catia La Mar, Vargas 1,094.47
13. San Antonio de Los Altos (Los Salias), Miranda 1065.68
14. Carrizal, Miranda 970.25
15. El Limón (Mario Briceño Iragorry), Aragua 944.04
16. Palmira (Guásimos), Táchira 932.00
17. Santa Cruz (José Angel Lamas), Aragua 800.90
18. San Cristóbal, Táchira 766.64
19. Cagua (Sucre), Aragua 761.63
20. Pampatar (Maneiro), Nueva Esparta 749.08

== See also ==
- Demographics of Venezuela
- Spanish immigration to Venezuela
- Portuguese Venezuelan
- Arab Venezuelans
- Mestizos in Venezuela
- White Latin Americans
- White Colombians
- Afro-Venezuelans
- Romanian Venezuelan
- Hungarian Venezuelan
- Greeks in Venezuela
- Italian Venezuelans
- White people
- Venezuelans
- Basque Venezuelans
- Croatian Venezuelans
- Serbian Venezuelans
- Polish Venezuelans
- Slovene Venezuelans
- Russian Venezuelans
- Ukrainian Venezuelans
- History of the Jews in Venezuela
