= Russian Venezuelans =

People of Russian birth or origin who reside in Venezuela

Russian Venezuelan Ruso-venezolano · Русские венесуэльцы
Regions with significant populations
- Venezuela: Mainly Caracas, Merida, Valencia, Maracaibo

Languages
- Venezuelan Spanish, Russian

Religion
- Mainly Russian Orthodox Church, Roman Catholicism, some Protestantism, Judaism, Deism

Related ethnic groups
- Other Russian and Venezuelan people Other East European or Orthodox White Venezuelans as Ukrainian, Polish, Hungarian.

Russian Venezuelans (Spanish: Ruso-venezolano, Russian: Русские венесуэльцы) are Venezuelan persons of full, partial, or predominantly Russian ancestry, or Russian-born persons residing in Venezuela.

== History ==
Venezuela truly opened itself to Russia in the 20th century. In the early years, labor migrants began arriving in the country, and after the 1917 Revolution, political exiles from Russia – both monarchists and Kadets – began to appear. Later on, several families of Russian emigrants from China relocated to Venezuela. Until the middle of the 20th century, however, an organized colony of Russians living in Venezuela did not exist. Despite this lack of organization, the strong Russian footprint on the cultural life of Venezuela in the early 20th century was owed to the Russian artist Nikolai Ferdinandov. El Ruso, as he was called by Venezuelans.

A full-fledged Russian diaspora in Venezuela began to appear only in 1947. It was then, two years after the end of the Second World War, when the Venezuelan government decided to invite immigrants from a ruined Europe to develop the distant and scarcely inhabited regions of the country. Accordingly, Venezuela did not place any limitations on profession, knowledge of language or age, restrictions which were common in the United States, Canada and other countries. Many of Russians countrymen – emigrants of the first wave, Soviet citizens driven to work in Germany, former Red Army captives who did not want to return to the Soviet Union – decided to take the risky step and take Caracas up on its offer. This was how the future “Russian Venezuelans” motivated themselves to cross the ocean and leave the hunger and cold of Europe behind. In their new place of residence, the Russian émigrés received ten dollars per person from the International Red Cross. With this “capital,” they began their lives in Venezuela.

Some of the Russian émigrés settled on the outskirts of Caracas, while others ventured into more distant regions of the country. Initially, Russians worked as low-skilled laborers, but having established their presence, they soon began to take on more interesting (and higher-paying) professions. For example, they took part in demarcating the country’s borders, built roads, bridges, tunnels, and took up work in the oil industry. Russian engineers helped build the Humboldt Hotel, which was once a symbol of Caracas. Many Russians, after learning Spanish, took positions in Venezuelan ministries, universities and private companies. The presence of Russians in Venezuela brought first theatre and ballet to the country for the first time. Even beauty contests have not taken place without the participation of Russian women. It’s well known that Venezuela has won many beauty contests worldwide, and it’s not surprising to hear such names as Lyudmila Vinogradoff among the participants.

== Religion ==
The Russian Orthodox Church. Orthodox Christianity came to the country in 1947 when Archpriest Vladimir Chekanovsky arrived with the first group of émigrés. Thanks to the efforts of another cleric, Archpriest John Baumanis, Russian Orthodox parishes were founded in Caracas, Valencia, Barquisimeto, Maracay and Barcelona. In recent years, a number of new priests have come to Venezuela from Europe and the United States.

By the early 1950s, Orthodox parishes had been established in virtually all areas of Russian settlement. These parishes were under the jurisdiction of the Russian Orthodox Church Outside Russia. The first Orthodox church in Venezuela – the Church of the Sign of the Mother of God in Valencia – was built in 1950 under the initiative of Vadim Ordovsky-Tanaevsky (father of Rostislav) and according to an architectural design by V.E. Sheffer. In 1955, the Cathedral of St. Nicholas was consecrated in the Dos Caminos region of Caracas. To this day, the cathedral remains an integral part of Russian spiritual life in Venezuela. Two additional stone churches were built in the provinces – St. Peter and Paul in Maracay and St. Nicholas in Barquisimeto.

Over the following decades, the Russian Orthodox parishes served as the focal point of the Russian diaspora’s spiritual life in Venezuela. These parishes opened Sunday schools for the children of Russian immigrants. At the Cathedral of St. Nicholas in Caracas, a funeral box was established to pay for the burials of the poor, and in 1965, a decision was made to purchase a section of the municipal cemetery.

== See also ==
- Immigration to Venezuela
- White Venezuelan
- Russia-Venezuela relations
