= Czechs in Venezuela =

Languages
- Spanish · Czech

Religion
- Christianity · Judaism · Others

Related ethnic groups
- Czechs, German Venezuelan, Slovene Venezuelan, Other Venezuelan

The Czech immigration in Venezuela began during the end of World War II. By 1950, the Czech colony was one of the most scarce European immigrant groups in the country: 1,124 people, according to the census of the time. It was not often that the Czechs people left their country with the express hopes of being settled in Venezuela. Many arrived after trying their luck in other countries; Others, by reference of third parties. But the main reason to settle here was simply the ease with which the Venezuelan government granted visas.

The second wave of immigration that came out of Czechoslovakia in this century, that of 1968, was numerous. Although most preferred countries in Western Europe, the United States or Canada, a few came to Venezuela. But after the division of Czechoslovakia (split today in the Czech Republic and Slovakia), the democratic opening, immigration to Venezuela has been almost nil.

At the Embassy of the Czech Republic in Caracas were registered at the end of the twentieth century just over 200 immigrants in the country but could be more. There is no known statistic, but according to Ambassador Antonin Blazek, if one compares the relationship between the number of immigrants and contributions to the country (means in commercial and cultural benefits), the Czechs could lead the list in Venezuela as one of the most productive immigrant colonies.

== Notable people ==
- Emil Friedman, violinist.
- Vladimir Kubis, veterinary
- Karl Stohr, composer and poet
- Harry Osers, engineer
- Peter Seidemann, engineer
- Hans Neumann, chemist
- Lothar Neumann, chemist
- Vanessa Neumann, lawyer
- Richard Novicki, parasitologist
- Karl Roubicek, brewer master
- Perla Vonasek, actress
- L. Rafael Reif, engineer and inventor. 17th president of Massachusetts Institute of Technology
- Anneliese Rockenbach, swimmer
- Hellmuth Straka, anthropologist
- Tomas Straka, historian
- Martin Trnovsky, chemist
- Ernst Tugendhat, philosopher.

== See also ==
- Czech diaspora
- Immigration to Venezuela
