= Nordic Venezuelans =

Total population
- c. 2,000

Regions with significant populations
- Caracas

Languages
- Spanish, Swedish, Danish, Norwegian, Finnish

Related ethnic groups
- Venezuelans, Danes, Norwegians, Swedes, Finns, Icelanders, Faroe Islanders

A Nordic Venezuelans are a Venezuelan persons with full or partial Nordic ancestry, or a Nordic-born persons living in Venezuela. Nordic settlement in Venezuela is little-known, due to a lack of information about its colonization.

== Swedish colonization attempt in Esequibo ==
During the 18th century, Swedes attempted to colonize the Essequibo region between the lower Orinoco and Barima rivers in Guyana's present-day Barima-Waini region. The Swedes, settled in the area since July 1732, were expelled in 1737 by forces led by Major Sergeant Carlos Francisco Francois Sucre y Pardo (grandfather of Venezuelan independence leader Antonio José de Sucre). A century later, about 50 Swedes and Norwegians lived in central Venezuela.

== Evangelical Free Churches and missionaries ==
=== Scandinavian Alliance Mission in western Venezuela ===
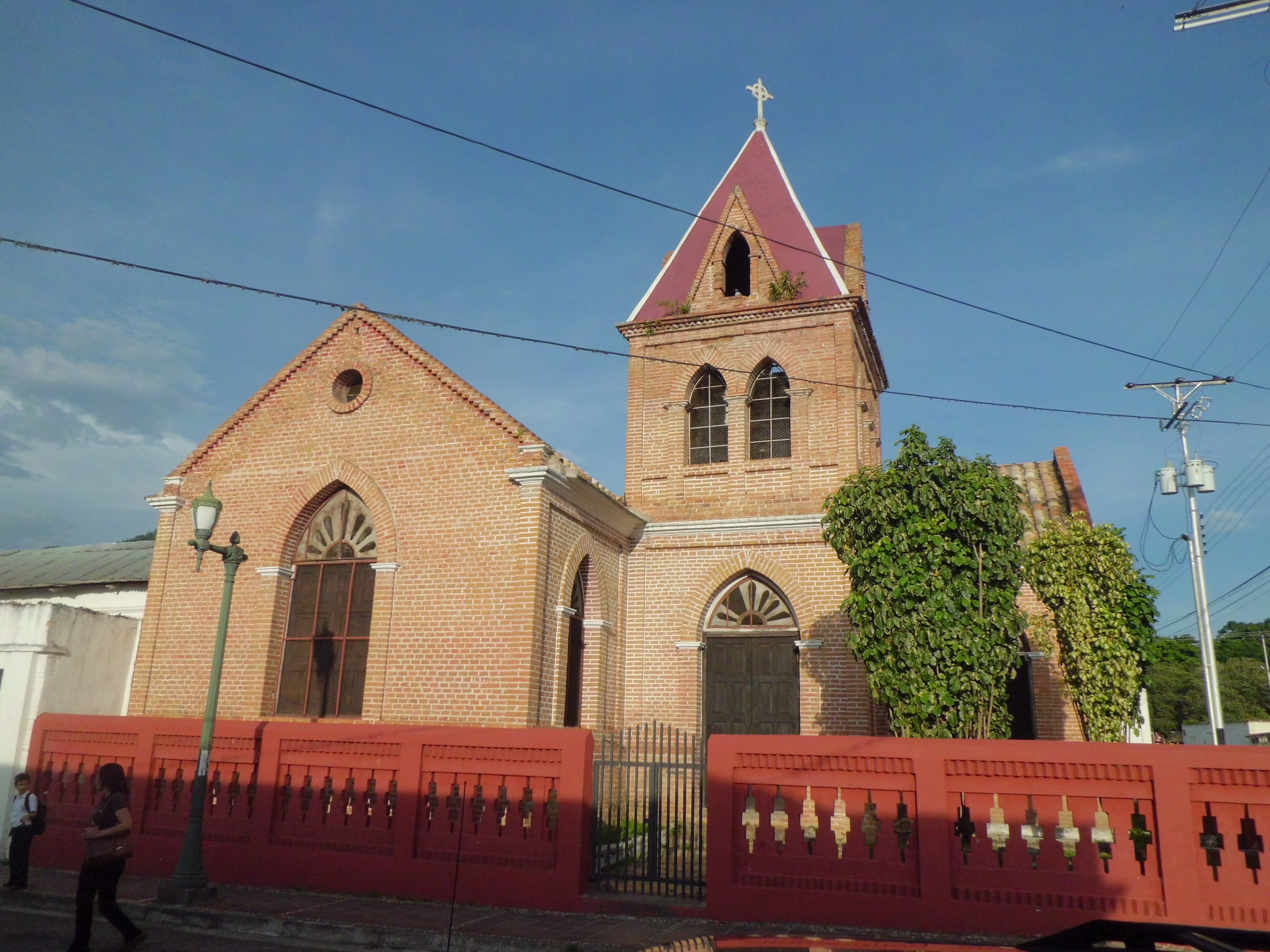
The Nordic-architecture Cristo Vive Evangelical Church (1917) in Rubio, better known as the Celtic Cross Church

It is believed that some of the first Nordic people to arrive in Venezuela were Danish Protestant missionaries from the Scandinavian Alliance Mission (SAM) in 1890. An additional small group of Nordic missionaries arrived in the country during the early 20th century; most were Scandinavian by birth or ancestry, and had previously immigrated to the United States. Several Nordic families moved to Maracaibo, and Rubio, remaining for at least 20 years; family names include Bach-Anderson, Christiansen-Gundersen, Eikland-Undheim, and Holmberg-Noren. Other individuals arrived as teachers. They established evangelical schools in the cities in which they settled: Colegio Evangélico Americano, Christiansen Academy (1951-2002) and the Juan Christiansen private school, named for Johann Christiansen Christensen (the first Danish Protestant in Táchira).

In Maracaibo, the missionaries founded Libertador American Evangelical School (now Peniel Private School) and a Bible college directed and staffed by Scandinavians; teachers included Astrid Erickson, Rose Erlandberg, and Harriet Handlogten.

==== Christiansen Academy ====
Christiansen Academy was an international private boarding school in Rubio which was founded in 1951 to serve missionaries' children in South America and the Caribbean. It was operated by the Evangelical Alliance Mission, the former Scandinavian Alliance Mission.

=== Free Swedish Church in central Venezuela ===
The first Free Swedish Church missionary arrived in Venezuela by 1898: the Swedish-American David Eduard Finstrom, from Kerkhoven, Minnesota. The Free Swedish Church is unrelated to the Scandinavian Alliance Mission. Finstrom later returned to the US, married Carrie Falk from Dalarna, Sweden, returned to La Victoria, Aragua, and founded Ebenezer Church. They helped establish the Emmanuel - Gott Mit Uns Church in Colonia Tovar, a German settlement. Other Swedish Americans, such as Wilford Anderson and Alford Bjurlin, developed congregations in the states of Aragua, Carabobo, and Guárico.

=== Olson family ===
During the early 1940s, an American family from the Swedish Baptist Church moved to Barquisimeto. Ingve Olson joined the German-American Assemblies of God missionary Bender-Schwager Kopittke (a former Independent Holiness Church missionary). They moved to Caracas two years later, establishing Las Acasias Pentecostal Church.

== Danish settlement in Chirgua, Carabobo ==
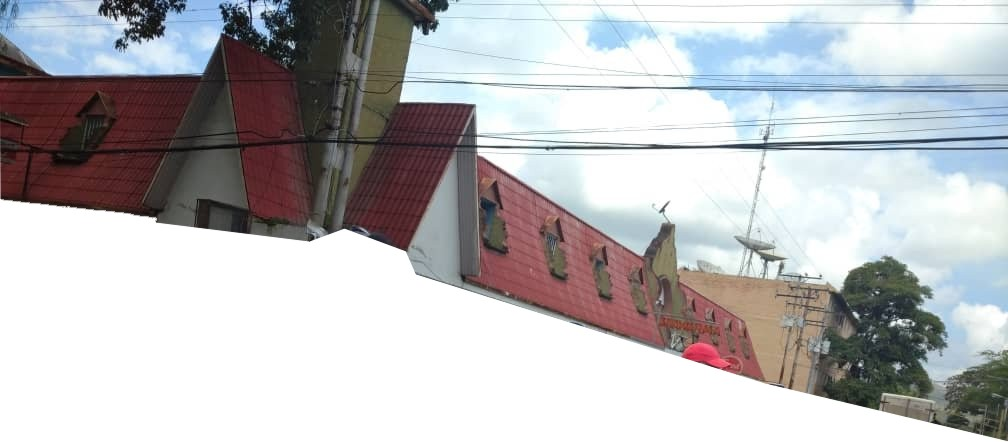
Danish architecture in Bejuma

In 1938, Venezuelan president Eleazar López Contreras created the Technical Institute of Immigration and Colonization to regulate European immigration to Venezuela. Among the first beneficiaries of López Contreras' policy were 48 Danish families: 2,780 people who were settled in Chirgua (Carabobo State) with 26 Venezuelan families. The settlement was unsuccessful, and 38 of 40 families were sent back to Denmark. Only two families and a few individual Danes preferred to stay in Chirgua.

== After World War II ==
After World War II, some emigration from Finland to Latin America continued. According to Finnish statistics, about 500 emigrants left for Latin American countries; Venezuela was among them. Small Finnish colonies have developed in major South American cities, including Caracas.

== Religion and culture ==
In October 1954, the Scandinavian community founded the Scandinavian Congregation (Spanish: Congregación Escandinava) in Caracas with the help of Bishop Åke Kastlund. They later founded the Lutheran Church of La Resurrección in La Castellana district with members of the German, Hungarian and Latvian Protestant communities.

Some celebrate Midsommar, which coincides with the Venezuelan Fiesta de San Juan. It is celebrated with a traditional campfire, songs and dances around the midsommarstång.

== Notable people ==
=== Norwegian ===
- Peter Bastiansen
- Thor Halvorssen (human rights activist)
- Thor Halvorssen (businessman)

=== Swedish ===
- Eva Ekvall
- Eva Lisa Ljung
- Dogge Doggelito
- Omar Rudberg
