= Basque Venezuelan =

Venezuelan citizens with Basque ancestry

Basque Venezuelans (Spanish: Venezolanos Vascos; Basque: Euskal Venezuelarrak) are citizens of Venezuela who are of Basque ancestry.

== History ==
=== Conquerors and settlers ===
Since 1515 the island of Cubagua became the Spanish economic hub of the Caribbean thanks to pearls. The royal officials charged with overseeing and collecting this great treasure were almost all Basques as Juan López de Arrichulueta, royal overseer of pearls trade; Martín de Ochandiano, royal treasurer of Cubagua. By 1516 the navigator and slave hunter Juan Bono de Quejo sailing from Cubagua explored Trinidad island and the Orinoco Delta. In 1519, the ship ownners Sancho Ortiz de Urruela and Juan Urrutia successfully secured official royal licenses to finance and lead trade-and-rescue expeditions (armadas de rescate) directly to these shores. Friar Antonio de Bilbao, a Franciscan friar served as prior of the Nueva Cádiz convent of Cubagua around 1531. The captain Domingo de Zubizarreta and merchant Sancho de Lizaur controlled the maritime traffic in eastern Venezuela.

Juan Pérez de Tolosa, judge of residence for the province of Venezuela and Cabo de la Vela, arrived in 1546 and restored the order in the cities of Coro and El Tocuyo. His brother Alonso recognized what would be Trujillo. In 1589 the first Simon Bolivar, from Zenarruza, royal clerk and secretary of the Real Audiencia of Santo Domingo,] passed to Caracas as the first perpetual regidor and procurator general. He was responsible for the creation of schools of first letters and a seminary of grammar directed by Juan de Arteaga and Simón de Basauri (1591). Captain Antonio de Berrio, a pearl seeker in Guayana, went down the rivers to the Orinoco where he founded San Jose de Oruña (1592) and Santo Tomás de Guayana (1593, later Angostura). The adventure of El Dorado (1561) began with Lope de Aguirre and Pedro de Ursúa as the protagonists and Barquisimeto as the end point of it. Already in the c. XVII, ranch owners, such as Francisco de Arrieta, Pedro Hernández de Galarza and Antonio Arraez de Mendoza in the Bobures Valley, Juan Félix de Arrúa in the Chama valley, etc. Among the governors and members of the Caracas chapter, Basque's surnames such as Alquiza, Hernani, Oñate, Aguirre, Hoz de Berrio, Ybarra, Bolívar, Lezama, Arguinzoniz, Zabala, Hurtado, Arechederra, Mendoza, Arteaga, Múxica and Butrón, Villela, Echeverria, Landaeta, Guevara, Zuazo, Arraez, Ochoa, Bera settled on the city. In Barinas, the Ochagavía, in Barquisimeto the Ansola, in Mérida the Uzcategui, etc. In the fight against the Dutch pirates of the first third of the century, Navarre Lope Díaz de Armendáriz (Marquis of Cadreita), Admiral Manuel de Redín and his brother, Captain Tiburcio Redín, entered Capuchin in 1637 and died in 1651 in La Guaira.

=== Capuchin missionaries ===
They were part of the white population penetration promoted by Spanish crown, for which they learned the aboriginal languages. In 1672 Francisco de Puente la Reina and 10 other friars, passed to Cumaná where they resided during 40 years. This Navarrese founded the Conversion of the Christian Doctrine for the Chaima Indians. Francisco Javier de Alfaro (Manuel Frías) moved from the convent of Los Arcos to Maracaibo; wrote a catechism for each group of native coianos, chaques and anatomists. Nicolás de Renteria missioned in Los Llanos in 1663. Antonio de Idiazabal arrived in Venezuela in 1672 and died, ill, in Cumaná.

=== Real Compañía Guipuzcoana de Caracas ===
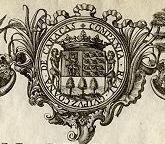
Logo of the Royal Guipuzcoan Company of Caracas

It was the most important mercantile company of its time (1728–1785); Its objective to displace the Dutch from the Venezuelan cocoa trade (also tobacco and hides). The royal permit authorized the Guipuzcoans based in San Sebastián to bring it in exchange for carrying their own merchandise from Pasaia and Cádiz and to pay a canon to the monopolistic port of Cádiz. The main factor in Caracas was Pedro de Olavarriaga. Factories were opened in La Guaira, Caracas, Puerto Cabello, San Felipe, Maracaibo, Cumaná and Guayana. Not only did he carry goods from Gipuzkoa, but also supplies and troops and enabled his own ships to defend Venezuela from the English attacks, a war in which Blas de Lezo was distinguished. It was due to the colonization of Cumana and several fishing trials. The Basques established in Venezuela continued colonization mainly in the valleys of Aragua, in the plains of Cojedes, Portuguesa, Orinoco and coasts of Caracas. They introduced, among other things, the indigo of dye, the cotton and the sugar cane. The free trade declaration of 1778 and the English harassment determined its closure. The link with Pasaia-San Sebastián remained until the end of the century.

=== Second wave of Basque immigration ===
In 1939 as a result of the Spanish Civil War, begins the arrival at Venezuelan ports of what is considered the largest migration of Basques to Venezuela since the colonial period. With the support of the Basque Government in exile, the Venezuelan Government of General Eleazar López Contreras and with the approval of a large number of Venezuelan intellectuals such as Arturo Uslar Pietri and Antonio Arraíz, on June 24 of the same year, 82 Basques addressed the Transatlantic "Cuba" in the French port of Le Havre departing for Venezuela under the notes of the Txistu de Segundo de Atxurra who interprets the Agur Jaunak, many of them never returning. The arrival of this first contingent was an event in the Caracas of the time and the local press echoed the same dedicating some reviews, in the same it is mentioned that on Sunday July 6, 1939 after hearing Mass in the Church of Santa Rosalía in the city of Caracas, the group accompanied by Arturo Uslar Pietri and Simón Gonzalo Salas made a wreath to the remains of the Liberator Simon Bolivar in the National Pantheon, singing the Agur Jaunak, the National Anthem of Venezuela and the Eusko Abendaren Ereserkia, creating this last great controversy since some media criticized this, erroneously, for having been interpreted communist hymns in the national pantheon, a situation that was not taken into account by the Venezuelan Government. To this first contingent others occurred almost consecutively and with a larger number of people.

== Caracas Basque Center ==
On March 3, 1950, the Basque Center of Caracas was inaugurated with the presence of the Lehendakari José Antonio Aguirre and the Basque delegate in New York, Jesús de Galíndez, where they keep alive the legacies and customs of the exiles and publish Caracas'ko Eusko Etxea.

At present it is the most populous Basque Center (600 families, predominantly Vizcainos and Alaveses) and one of the most important in the world. Built in the neighborhood of El Paraíso.

== Euzko Gaztedi and the extraterritorial press ==
EG was created in 1948 in the heart of the Centro Vasco de Caracas (Basque Center of Caracas) with the purpose of grouping the youth and promoting cultural and social activities. Its presidents were: Martín Ugalde, Sabin Zenarruzabeitia, Jon Urrezti, Iñaki Elguezabal, Jon Aretxabaleta, Jesus Dolara, Joseba Leizaola, Rosario Amestoy, Iñaki Aretxabaleta, Joseba Bilbao, Joseba Iturralde, Txomin Bizkarret, Bilgen Amézaga, Iñaki Anasagasti, Jesús Azpiritxaga, Iñaki Goikoetxea, Xabier Azpiritxaga, Adolfo Urrutia and Ander Amenabar. From the work of this group invigorated by Jokin Intza emerges Euzko Gaztedi of the Basque Interior-Resistance (EGI), dependent of the PNV, that clandestinely introduced the magazine "Gudari" in Overseas between 1960-1974 and published important titles (Steer, Landáburu, Azpiazu, Aguirre, Leizaola, Abrisketa, etc.). Some of its members and the new refugees of the 60 establish a group related to ETA. The Basque-Venezuelan impulse to the Basque press in America, France and underground was very important with about 30 different modalities among which the magazine "Noticentro" of the Caracas Basque Center.

== Notable people ==
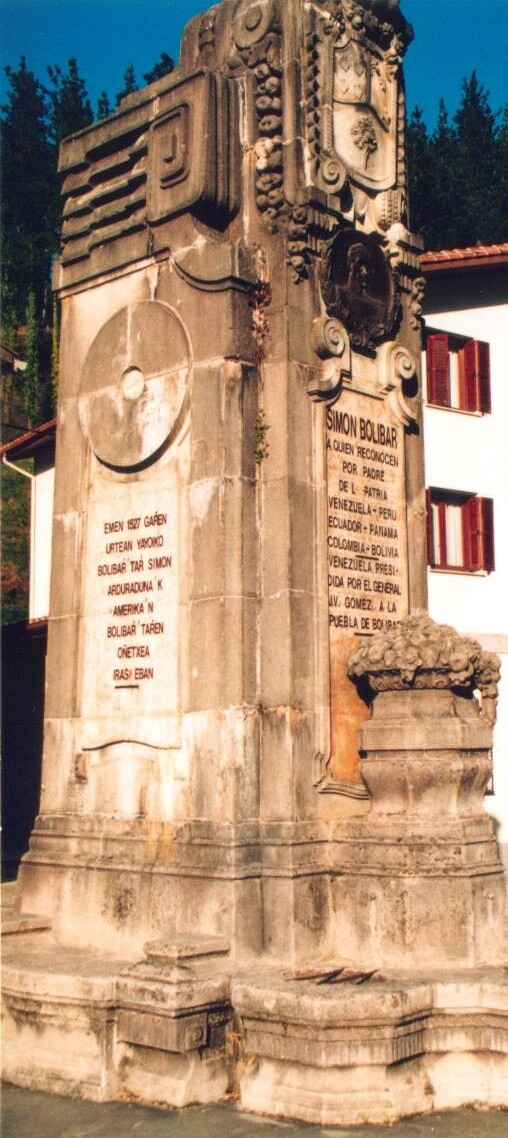
Monument to Simón Bolívar, in Ziortza-Bolibar (Basque Country)

- Jose Altuve, professional baseball second baseman for the Houston Astros of Major League Baseball (MLB).
- Iñaki Anasagasti, politician
- Fernando Amorebieta, former professional footballer.
- Jon Aramburu, professional football player for Real Sociedad.
- Antonio Aranguren, entreprenour, CEO of Venezuela Oil Concessions
- Juan Bautista Arismendi, militar
- Josefa Aristeguieta, politician
- Jean Aristeguieta, poet and editor
- Fernando Aristeguieta, professional footballer who plays for Caracas as a striker.
- Antonio Arraiz, writer and diplomat
- Diego Arria, politician and diplomat
- José Antonio Anzoátegui, Brigadier General in the Battle of Boyacá, helping to lead a republican army of Colombians and Venezuelans against Spanish royalist forces during the Venezuelan War of Independence.
- José María Aurrecoechea, militar
- Goizeder Azúa, TV Host, anchorwoman, model, journalist, and beauty queen who won Miss International 2003.
- Doris Benegas, political lawyer specialising in criminal law, particularly causes related to women and left-wing politics.
- José María Benegas, politician for the Spanish Socialist Workers' Party (PSOE).
- Simón Bolívar, military and political leader who played a leading role in the establishment of Venezuela, Bolivia, Colombia, Ecuador, Peru and Panama as sovereign states, independent of Spanish rule.
- William Echeverria, journalist and politician
- Heriberto Echezuria, geologist
- Xabier Elorriaga, contemporary film and TV actor, writer and director.
- José Esparza, virologist.
- Unai Etxebarria, retired road racing cyclist. He rode for Euskaltel–Euskadi his entire career, from 1996 until 2007.
- Yon Goicoechea, lawyer.
- Francisco de Guruceaga Iturriza, religious, Bishop of La Guaira
- Ignacio Iribarren Borges, diplomat
- Boris Izaguirre, screenwriter, journalist, writer, TV host and showman.
- Felipe Larrazábal, musician and politician
- Wolfgang Larrazábal, naval officer and politician. He served as President of Venezuela following the overthrow of Marcos Pérez Jiménez on 23 January 1958.
- Julio Lobo Olavarria, sugar trader and banker
- Leopoldo López, politician and political prisoner.
- Narciso López, adventurer and soldier, best known for an expedition aimed at liberating Cuba from Spain in the 1850s. His troops carried a flag that López had designed, which later became the flag of modern Cuba.
- Ernesto Mayz Vallenilla, philosopher
- Cristobal Mendoza Hurtado, First President of Venezuela.
- Eduardo Mendoza Goiticoa, scientific researcher and agricultural engineer.
- Arturo Michelena, painter
- Garbiñe Muguruza, professional tennis player who represents Spain in tennis competitions and turned professional in 2012. She won the French Open in 2015 and Wimbledon in 2017
- Jorge Olavarria, writer and editor
- Juan Francisco Otaola Pavan, engineer
- Luis Ugalde, philosopher
- José Urdaneta, militar
- Rafael Urdaneta, militar, last president of Gran Colombia
- Virginia Urdaneta, architect and actress
- Wenceslao Urrutia, politician
- José Uzcátegui, boxer who competes in the Super Middleweight division.
- Rafael Uzcátegui, sociologist
- Ramón José Velásquez, historian, journalist, lawyer and former President of Venezuela between 1993 and 1994.
- Pedro Maria Velaz, religious, writer, diplomat
- Mikel Villanueva, footballer who plays for Spanish club Málaga CF as a central defender.
- Oswaldo Vizcarrondo, professional footballer who plays as a centre back.
- Stephanie de Zorzi, model and beauty pageant titleholder
- Cesar Zumeta, writer, diplomat

== See also ==
- Immigration to Venezuela
- Venezuelans of European descent
- Spanish Venezuelan
