= Greeks in Venezuela =

Total population
- 3,000 Greece-born residents

Regions with significant populations
- Venezuela: Mainly Greater Caracas, Valencia, Maracay, Barquisimeto, Puerto La Cruz, Ciudad Guayana

Languages
- Predominantly Spanish and Greek

Religion
- Predominantly Greek Orthodox

Related ethnic groups
- Other European Venezuelan, Greek diaspora

Greeks in Venezuela are Venezuelan residents who are either fully or partially of Greek descent, or a Greece-born person who resides in Venezuela. They are mostly located in the north-center of Venezuela, concentrated in Caracas and Valencia.

== History ==
=== First generation ===
Apparently, one of the first Greeks to arrive in the country was "Juan El Griego" to Margarita Island, and "Kalimios" in 1922, who founded the company of "Ferry-Boats" in Maracaibo Lake.

Most of the Greeks that are still living in the country came in 1948, from Greece and other close countries, immediately after the end of World War II, due to the prevailing conditions of poverty and unemployment in Europe. Most were of Greek origin, born in Greece or in neighboring countries, but of Greek parents or grandparents. The group of about 160 who come to Venezuela in that year, about 30 were from Romania, between 30 and 40 from Germany and the rest from Greece. Apparently then come some other Greeks, who had initially arrived in other countries of America.

2,000 more Greeks arrived later between 1955 and 1957. After these groups, immigration decreased, and since 1960, the majority of those who came do so for family reunification. These Greeks came to the country primarily for economic reasons, attracted by newscasts, written advertisements and films in which they talked about Venezuela, oil and the need for immigrants to agricultural and industrial activities.

Most of the arrivals in 1948 and 1955-1957 remained in Caracas. Those who settled across the country did it basically in Miranda, Lara, Zulia, Aragua and Carabobo state.

The first generation mostly learned the Spanish language by talking to people on the street because they had to work for a living. They established "meeting points" to practice their language and exchange with the peasants. So the Greek Association of Venezuela emerged on Avenida Libertador in 1954, Fanis Karaindros' Greek Café in the Plaza de San Jacinto from 1956 to 1961, and the Greek Orthodox Community in North Florida district in 1961.

Other ways to preserve their language and culture were the creation of the Greek School (1967-1968) and the publication of newspapers, this last is carried out almost entirely by Nicholas Palamidis. The newspapers were: News Greek (Noticias Griegas) (1961-1964), Press Greek (Prensa Griega) (1964-1966), Greek Voice (Voz Griega) (1966-1968), Free Satire (Sátira Libre) (1967-?), Greek Light (Luz Griega) (published jointly by the Greek Orthodox Community, 1968–1979) and the newspaper Democracy (co-published by the Venezuelan Antidictatorial Committee of Greeks, 1968-?).

To practice their religion, the Greek Orthodox Archdiocese of America asked to assign them a representative, which achieved in 1956 and built a small chapel in 1961, which runs until the start of construction of the current Byzantine Cathedral (opened in February 1992 ). Most of this generation had only primary education, few knew a skilled job, so they set out to be street vendors, artisans or skilled workers. A few, after some years, collected some capital and established small industries. Currently, most of them are traders which own businesses or small industries.

=== Second generation ===
Few members of the second generation of Greek Venezuelans dominate perfectly Greek language. They learned Spanish language in Venezuelan schools and in daily contact with friends, neighbors and business of their parents. The Greek language is only practiced it at home, meeting places to which they were with their parents, in the Church and in the Greek school where many of them came on Saturdays. They are still Orthodox. Religion is passed through oral tradition and family daily contact through the calendar of festivals in the community -which is largely religious- and classes taught at the Greek school. Both generations helped build chapels and churches in several cities: Maracaibo, Barquisimeto, Valencia, Valles del Tuy conurbation. In Caracas for three decades, they dedicated to raise money for the construction of the first Latin American Byzantine Cathedral opened on 23 February 1992.

In 1957, for the first time, a melkite pope of the Society of the Missionaries of St. Paul, Gabriel Dick, took pastoral care of the Greek community in the country. The Apostolic Exarchate of Venezuela was erected on 19 February 1990 with the papal bull Quo longius of Pope John Paul II.

== Population ==
In the 1950 census for the first time are recorded as living in the country 496 Greeks, this number increased to 1566 in 1961, then 1684 in 1971 and decrease to 1453 in 81. Nowadays the number of Greece-born residents are around 3000.

== Festivities ==
List of the typical Greek holidays the Greek community tend to celebrate in Venezuela:

- 1 January: Saint Basil or New Year
- 6 January: Theofania or Baptism of Jesus Christ
- 7 January: St. John the Baptist - Carnival
- 25 March: Independence Day and The Annunciation
- Easter: (Responds to the lunar calendar): The most important dates are Holy Saturday and Easter Sunday or "Anastasis", which are the most important religious celebrations all year and is celebrated with great joy. That day the Easter eggs are blessed and game Eggs is performed. After Midnight Mass, the feast of the "Anastasis" is celebrated and celebrate the Anastasios and Anastasias with traditional dances and food as "Magiritzia", "Tzurekia" and "Kuluria" and on Sunday it is done the "Agape" Love.
- 21 May: St. Constantine and Helen.
- 15 August: Feast of the Assumption of the Virgin and Day of the Greek Church in Caracas
- 28 October: Greek Refusal to Italians in World War II.
- 17 November: The Athens Polytechnic Day Massacre
- 24 November: Day of the Greek Resistance
- 6 December: Saint Nikolaos
- 25 December: Christmas
- 31 December: End of year

== Plaza Atenas (Athens Square) ==
It's a plaza located in Caracas, originally called "Placita Cruz Diez", the plaza ceased to be called that way when it was delivered into the custody of the Greeks where they remodeled it and took care of it.

It was built in a natural site where a Saman tree (located in the middle of it) makes a natural obstacle that forces the Avenida Los Pinos bifurcates into two channels. It has a bust of Socrates raised on a pedestal and a plate with the data of its inauguration and the name of Plaza Atenas, in honour of Athens and the Greek community in Venezuela.

== Notable Greek Venezuelans ==
- Efterpi Charalambidis
- Homero Cunyopoulos
- Evangelos Hatgikonstantis
- Nicolás Palamidis
- Emmanuel Remundakis
- Costa Palamides
- Yannis Ioannidis
- Pantelis Palamides
- Princess Tatiana of Greece and Denmark
- Genadios Xhrisoulakis
- Efterpi Charalambidis
- Rita Verreos
- Giorgios Rigas* (Suspected by interpol)

== See also ==
- Melkite Greek Catholic Apostolic Exarchate of Venezuela
- Immigration to Venezuela
- White Venezuelan
- Greek people
- Greek diaspora
- Greece–Venezuela relations
