= Hungarian Venezuelans =

Hungarian Venezuelans Venezuelai magyarok Venezolanos Húngaros
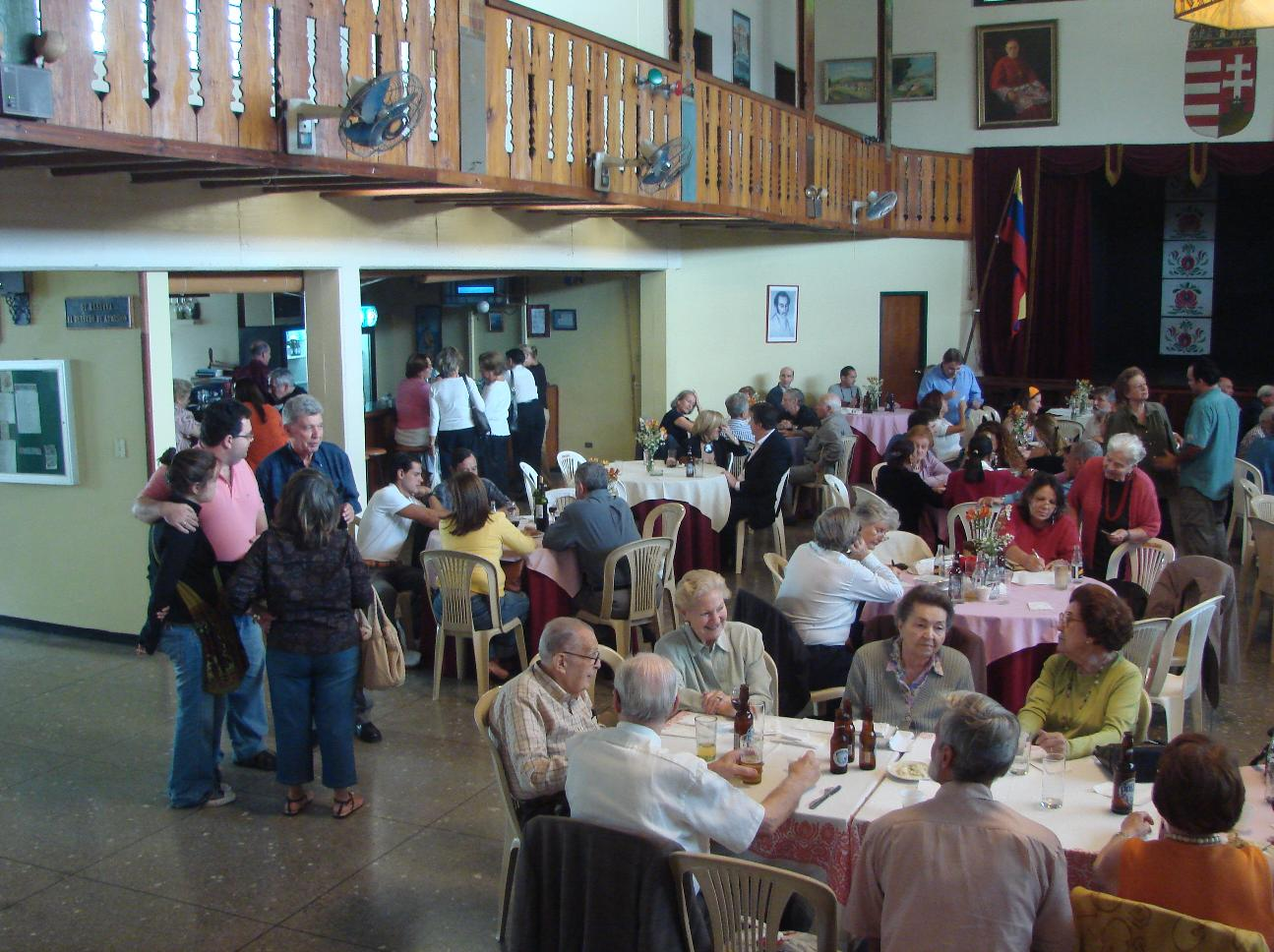
- Hungarian Cultural House in Caracas

Total population
- 4,000

Regions with significant populations
- Greater Caracas

Languages
- Spanish (Venezuelan Spanish), Hungarian

Religion
- Mostly Protestantism, Catholicism and Judaism

Related ethnic groups
- Venezuelan of European descent and Hungarian diaspora

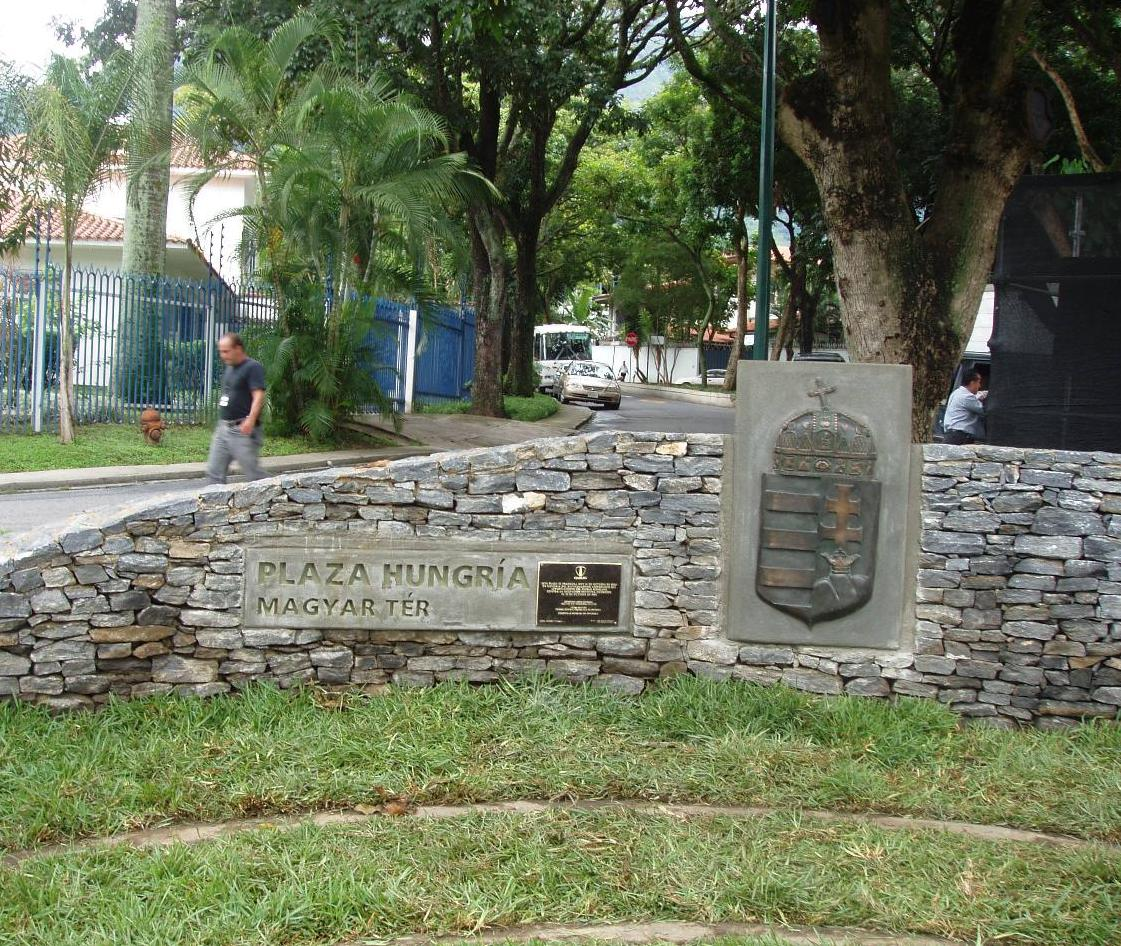
Hungary Square located in Caracas, donated by Leopoldo Lopez the mayor of the Chacao Municipality, after laborious efforts of the Hungarian Honorary Consul János Fenyves

The Hungarian-Venezuelan community is primarily composed of immigrants who left Hungary after World War II and the Hungarian Revolution of 1956. Although settled as immigrants in the second half of the 20th century, records of previous centuries prove there were Hungarians who visited Venezuela motivated by exploratory interests. Such is the case of the noble Hungarian expeditionary Pál Rosty de Barkócz, who traveled to the country in 1857 and photographed the region of San Juan de los Morros.

== History ==
Most Hungarian immigrants arrived from Europe in 1946, and soon began meeting in Caracas, initially in private homes and later they were in a small rented house in neighborhood of "Los Chorros" in Caracas.

Hungarian Protestant community (mostly Calvinist and Lutheran) then began meeting to read the Holy Scriptures, and to celebrate religious ceremonies since December 24 of 1948, when Dr. Paul Puky started such ceremonies in a camp called "El Trompillo", with 30 Hungarians. Afterwards, Protestants Hungarians continued to organize until in 1954, they built a church on their own in La Castellana district, together with the German, Latvian and Scandinavian Protestant communities.

In the decade of the 1950s many important personalities began to found the institutional and traditional bases of the community. In 1953 at the initiative of Mrs. Egyed Erzsébet, the first Fehérbál was performed, which were presented to the young Hungarian society, becoming a tradition that still exists to this day.

On the other hand, military commander Andrew Farkas and Géza Dolányi, were along with other members of the colony founders, the founders in 1954 of the "Mindszenty's Roman Catholic ecclesial community". Subsequently, Farkas was not only Catholic member of the council, but served as a mediator and peacemaker figure in the colony for decades.

=== The Hungarian Cultural House ===
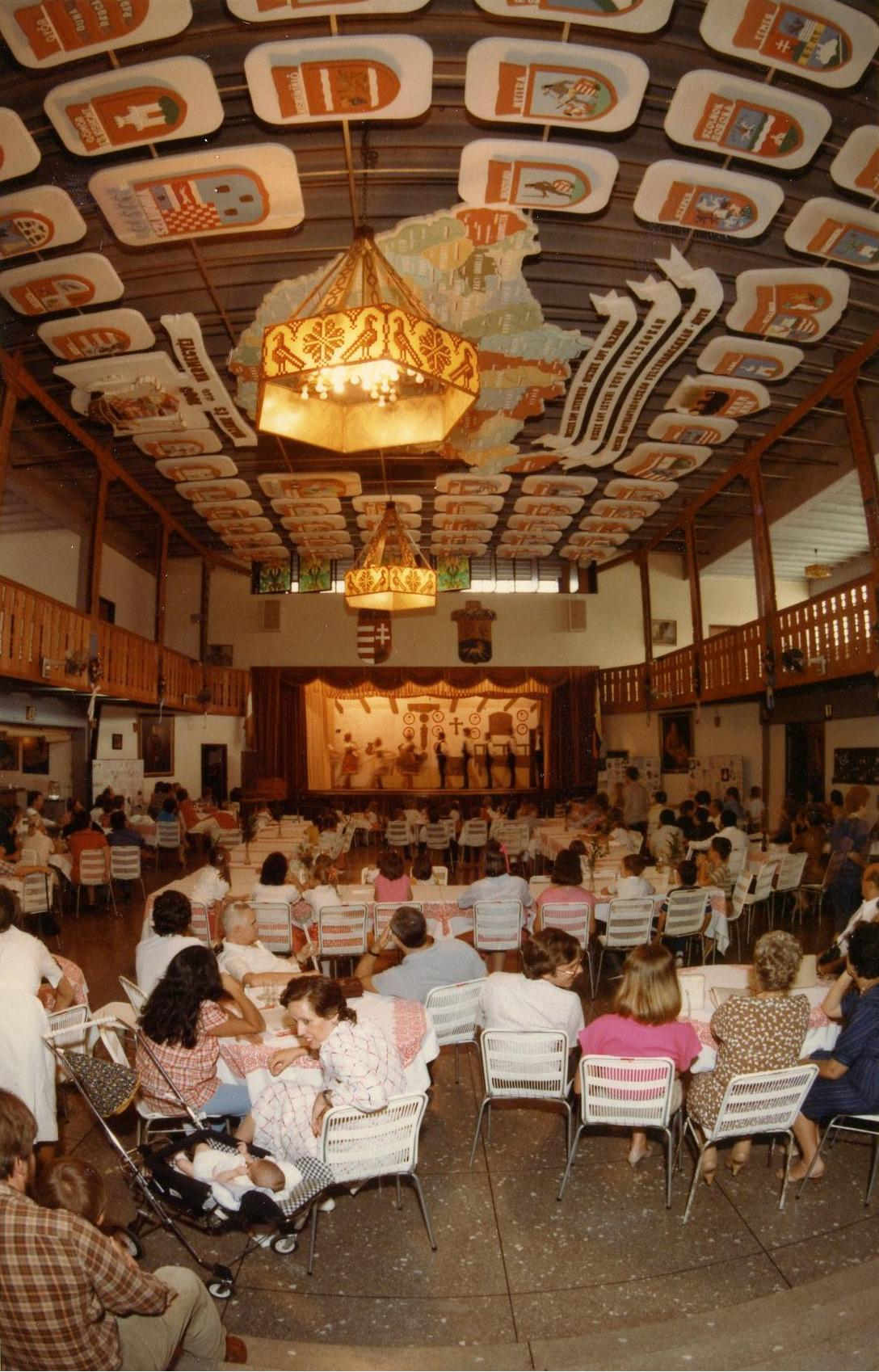
Hungarian Cultural House in Venezuela

Having grown more the diaspora, the Hungarians decided to acquire a larger land and build a cultural house, which could serve as headquarters for immigrants. The Venezuelan Social Hungarian Cultural Centre, known as "The Hungarian House" was opened in 1969, after the planning of architect Kornél Gyömrei. The foundation of the cultural center was initiated by initiative of Edit Kertész, who oversaw the construction of what became the largest House of Hungary in Latin America. Also it's one of the Hungarian houses artistically more elaborate, being a reference to the other colonies of Hungarian emigrants.

The Hungarian-Venezuelan colony has remained close to 16 organizations throughout its history, having their headquarters in the Hungarian House; among them are: The Association of Protestant Ladies Susana Lorantffy, the Saint Isabel's Association of Catholic Women, the Hungarian folk dance groups Buzavirág and Gyöngyösbokréta, four groups of scouts, Hungarian Historical Community, Hungarian Preschool, the Council of the Hungarian-Venezuelan Cadastre founded and led by Dr. Ildikó Kunckel, the director of the Hungarian Federation of Latin American Organizations

== Notable people ==
- Klára Lenz - Gobelin tapestry artist
- Catherine Fulop - actress, model, beauty pageant contestant, and television presenter.
- Alberto Barrera Tyszka - writer and teacher
- Carolina Izsák- Venezuelan beauty queen
- Nicolás Ladislao Fedor Flores - professional footballer who plays for Spanish club Rayo Vallecano as a striker
- Catalina Krishaber - wife of botanist Leon Croizat along with founded the “Jardin Botanico Xerofito” in Coro.
- Shirley Varnagy- Journalist

== See also ==
- Hungarian people
- Hungarian diaspora
- Immigration to Venezuela
