= Serbian Venezuelans =

Venezolanos Serbios Венецуелански Срби Venecuelanski Srbi
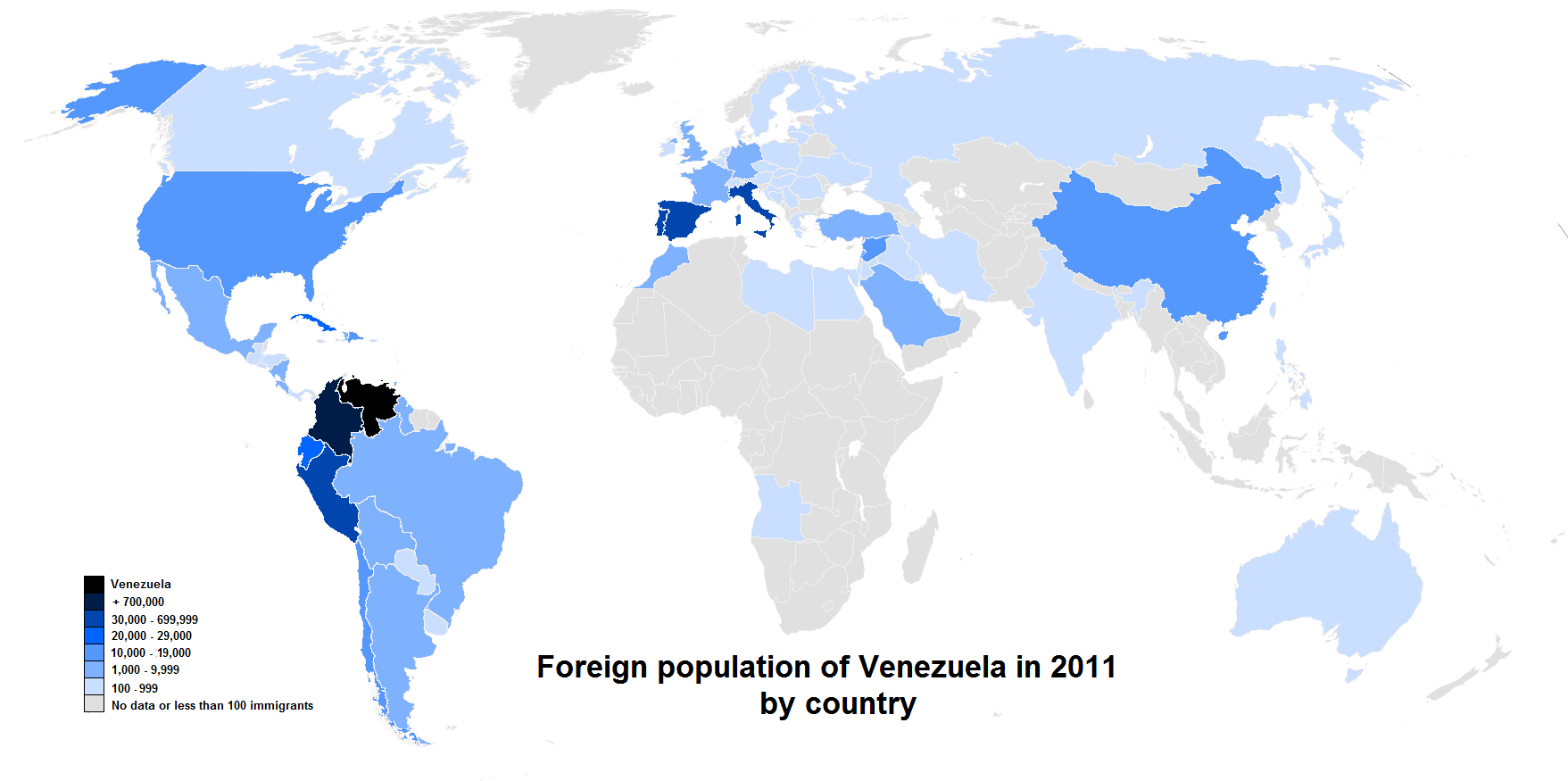
- Foreign-born population in Venezuela

Total population
- ~100 (est.)

Regions with significant populations
- Caracas, Maracaibo, and Maracay

Languages
- Venezuelan Spanish

Religion
- Predominately Catholicism, minority Eastern Orthodoxy (Serbian Orthodox Church)

Related ethnic groups
- White Venezuelan

Serbian Venezuelans or Serb Venezuelans are citizens of ethnic Serb descent under Venezuelan nationality law, mostly with partial or distant Serb ancestry, i.e. second- or third-generation immigrants.

== History ==
Serbian immigration to Venezuela dates back to the mid-20th century and consisted mainly of political emigrants, i.e. opponents of the newly established communist regime in Yugoslavia, who settled in Venezuela after World War II.

In 1955, they founded the Serbian Orthodox Christian community in Caracas. Later, they built the Serbian Orthodox church in 1966, where the consecration was attended by King Peter II of Yugoslavia. The Serbian Social Club of Aragua State was founded in 1965 by a group of Serb immigrants in order to preserve and promote Serb customs, religion, culture and folklore, with all the community based in the country without distinction of race or creed, sharing in the same space with the activities of the St. John the Baptist Church which belonged to the newly founded Serbian Orthodox Eparchy of Buenos Aires and South America.

== Demographics ==
By the late 1960s, the Serbian-Venezuelan population reached 2,000; it has been in constant decline since, with current estimates in the low hundreds.

== Notable people ==
- Aleksandar Janković – Chetnik voivode
- Miguel Socolovich – baseball player
- Veruska Ljubisavljević – model and beauty pageant titleholder

== See also ==
- Immigration to Venezuela
- European Venezuelan
- Serb diaspora
- Serbia–Venezuela relations
- Serbian Orthodox Eparchy of Buenos Aires, South America, and Central America
