= Croatian Venezuelans =

Venezuelans of Croat descent

Croatian Venezuelans Croata-venezolanos
- (Croatia) (Venezuela)

Total population
- 5,000

Regions with significant populations
- Capital, Central, Zulia, Andean and Eastern Regions

Languages
- Mainly Spanish and Croatian

Religion
- Christianity (predominantly Catholic), and others

Related ethnic groups
- Other Venezuelans, Croats, Croatian diaspora

Croatian Venezuelans (Croata-venezolano, Croata venezolano) are Venezuelans of full, partial, or predominantly Croat descent, or Croat-born people residing in Venezuela.

It is estimated that 5,000 Croats live in Venezuela.

== History ==
Croatian immigration to Venezuela dates back to the late nineteenth century, and was characterized by the individual arrival of merchant seamen. Until World War I, a few number of Croats settle in Venezuela, nevertheless it is in the period of the World War II when the Croatian families that escaped from the government of Tito begin to settle in the country. Most of these immigrants came from present-day Croatian territory, particularly from the coastal and inland areas of Dalmatia. Others came from Bosnia and Herzegovina.

== Status of Croats in Venezuela ==
In 1949 came the initiative to create the Asociación Croata Venezolana (Croatian Association of Venezuela), entity that was transformed in 1972 in the Centro Croata Venezolano (Venezuelan Croatian Center). The Comité Croata de Venezuela (Croatian Committee of Venezuela) had been operating in Caracas since 1958. Its purpose was to support the transformation of Croatia into an independent and democratic state. The installation of the Hogar Croata (Croatian Home) in 1962 at its headquarters in Chacao was of major importance. Celebration of cultural and social events and the organization of sporting events. La Sociedad de Damas Croatas (Croatian Women Society) was established in 1968 and the Venezuela-Croatia Economic Chamber (Camara Venezolano – Croata de Industria y Comercio – Cavecro) established in 1997.

The majority of the members of the Croatian community settled in Caracas and Valencia and, to a lesser extent, in other cities of the interior: Maracay, Maracaibo, Mérida and in localities of the Yaracuy state, where some joined the work in the sugar industry. Also, several forest technicians arrived that later contributed to the establishment of the School of Forestry Engineering at the University of the Andes. A large percentage of the Croatians were artisans, who later became small entrepreneurs, and many were professionals, especially engineers and technicians, who had outstanding performance in Venezuela.

== Notable Croatian Venezuelans ==
- Branko Benzon, physician, diplomat and politician.
- Ratomir Dujković, football player and trainer.
- Tatiana Blatnik, Princess of Greece and Denmark.
- Gabriela Elena Španić, actress known for her roles in several Latin telenovelas.
- Dani Španić, model, actress and TV Host.
- Milka Chulina, actress, model and Miss Venezuela 1992 winner, second runner-up at Miss Universe 1993 and Top 15 semifinalist at Miss International 1994.
- Zdenko Morović, footballer.
- Tomislav Jurić, painter.
- Seka Severin de Tudja, sculptor.
- Miguel Šočolović, major league baseball player.
- Dušan Žanko, writer and the intendant of the Croatian National Theatre in Zagreb from 1941 to 1943.
- Slavko Župčić, psychiatrist and writer.
- Ernesto Villegas, journalist, politician, and writer.
- Vladimir Villegas, journalist and politician, and news director of Globovisión.

== See also ==
- Croats
- List of Croats
- Immigration to Venezuela
- Venezuelans of European descent
