= Russia–Venezuela relations =

- Venezuela: Russia

Diplomatic mission
- Embassy of Venezuela, Moscow: Embassy of Russia, Caracas

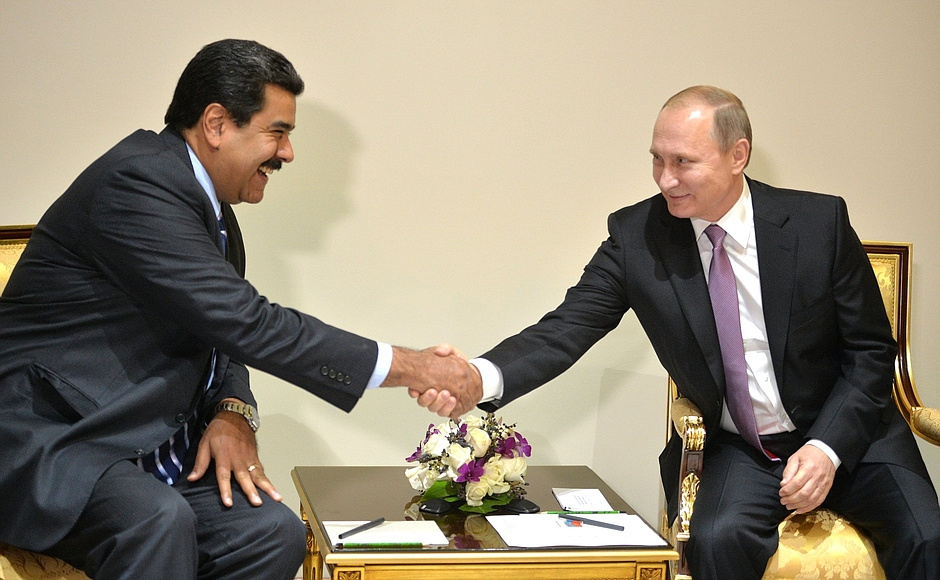
President Maduro meeting with Russian president Vladimir Putin in Tehran, Iran, in November 2015

Russia–Venezuela relations include cooperation between Russia and Venezuela in areas of common concern, such as their common status as oil exporters, and policy toward the United States. Venezuela is Russia's most important trading and military ally in Latin America. Russia recognized Nicolás Maduro as the president of Venezuela, instead of Juan Guaidó, in the Venezuelan presidential crisis.

== Background ==
The Soviet Union established diplomatic relations with Venezuela on March 3, 1945. In 1952, during the dictatorship of Marcos Pérez Jiménez, Venezuelan security police apprehended and deported suspected Russian spies, which caused bitter protests back and forth between the two countries, leading to Venezuela breaking off relations with the Soviets on June 13, 1952. The relations were restored on April 16, 1970.

== Chávez era ==
Under President Hugo Chávez, Venezuela enjoyed warm relations with Russia. Much of this was through the sale of military equipment; from 2005, Venezuela purchased more than $4 billion worth of arms from Russia. In September 2008, Russia sent Tupolev Tu-160 bombers to Venezuela to carry out training flights. In November 2008, both countries held a joint naval exercise in the Caribbean. Following Chavez's two visits to Moscow in July and September 2008, Russian Deputy Prime Minister Igor Sechin arrived in Venezuela to pave the way for a third meeting within five months between their two presidents.

In November 2008, Venezuela and Russia discussed 46 potential cooperation agreements during an intergovernmental commission. Venezuelan vice president Ramón Carrizales and Sechin reviewed a series of initiatives that Chavez and Russian president Dimitri Medvedev would sign later in the month. Venezuelan foreign minister Nicolás Maduro added to aggressive foreign policy initiatives sought by Chavez in saying that "the unipolar world is collapsing and finishing in all aspects, and the alliance with Russia is part of that effort to build a multipolar world." The two countries discussed the creation of a bi-national investment bank, the opening of a direct air route between Caracas and Moscow, the building of an aluminum plant, the construction of a gas platform off the Venezuelan coast, plans for automobile production, and Venezuela's acquisition of Russian planes and ships. While the two countries also reached agreements on the development of outer space and the use of nuclear energy. Maduro added that the two countries "will develop all what has to do with technology and satellite in the space", while still continuing to work at using nuclear energy with peaceful means to generate alternative energy.

Venezuela sought to develop mines at its largest gold deposits with help from Russia. Venezuelan Mining Minister, Rodolfo Sanz, told a Russian delegation that a memorandum of understanding would be signed with the Russian-owned Rusoro to operate the Las Cristinas and Brisas mine projects with the Venezuelan government. The former, one of Latin America's largest gold projects, was under contract to Canada's Crystallex, which had waited in vain for years for an environmental license to start mining. The minister, however, said the government was taking control of the mine to start work in 2009.

Further ties were in the offing when Chavez said an agreement for the Humberto Fernández-Morán Nuclear Facility would be signed upon Russian president Medvedev's visit to Venezuela accompanied by a Russian fleet of warships in mid-November 2008. Chavez also revealed that Russian nuclear technicians were already at work in Venezuela.

As a Russian flotilla, including the nuclear-powered warship Peter the Great, was on its way to the Caribbean for naval exercises with Venezuela, analysts saw the move as a geopolitical response to US support for Georgia following the 2008 South Ossetia War. Russian fighter jets have also been sold to Venezuela, while Caracas bought 100,000 AK-103 assault rifles to replace outdated FN FAL rifles for its military. However, the Russian Deputy Foreign Minister, Sergei Ryabkov downplayed the relevance of such moves "It looks like everyone has been accustomed for a long time to our warships being in naval bases and our warplanes in hangars, and thinking it will be like that forever", Ryabkov stated.

In September 2009 Russia approved a $2 billion loan to Venezuela.

2010 by agreement between the Fund of Housing at the mayor of Moscow and the Ministry of Housing Venezuela Russian contractors taking part in the "Great Housing Mission" for the construction of a typical panel housing. According to 13stroy.ru, they built about 10 thousand apartments in tenement houses. The project involves not only the construction of housing and infrastructure, but also the organization of nine joint ventures for the production of building materials.

In October, 2010, Chavez visited Russia where he signed a deal to build Venezuela's first nuclear power plant as well as buy $1.6 billion worth of oil assets.

On 6 October 2011, Russian Deputy Prime Minister Igor Sechin rushed to Caracas to get Chavez to commit to a $4 billion loan to purchase Russian weapons. In 2011, Venezuela was the top customer for Russia's arms for ground forces.

== Maduro era ==
Hugo Chávez died in March 2013. A special presidential election was held in April, which was won by Chávez's vice president, Nicolás Maduro.

In July 2017, during the crisis in Venezuela, in an article of Russia's Military-Industrial Courier, a journal popular with military officers of the Russian Armed Forces, in the event of a Venezuelan civil war, it was recommended that the Russian government provide military intelligence to the Bolivarian government, establish alliances with ALBA and to assist proxy leftist militant forces, such as colectivos, to maintain the Bolivarian government's power.

Maduro was re-elected for a second term in May 2018, but the result was denounced as fraudulent by most neighboring countries, the European Union, Canada and the United States. Russia, however, recognized the elections and Russian president Vladimir Putin congratulated Maduro.

In December 2018, Russia sent two Tupolev Tu-160 bombers to Venezuela. These jets are capable of carrying nuclear weapons. The Russian and Venezuelan militaries later conducted joint military exercises.

In January 2019, the majority opposition National Assembly declared that Maduro's reelection was invalid and declared its president, Juan Guaidó, to be acting president of Venezuela. The United States, Canada, Brazil and several Latin American countries recognized Guaidó as interim president. Russia, however, continued to support Maduro. It was also reported in January that Russian mercenaries linked to the Wagner Group had traveled to Venezuela in order to protect Maduro. There were conflicting reports on how large the group was or when they arrived with Yevgeny Shabaev, a Cossack leader with ties to military contractors, claiming they got the order to travel on 21 January "to protect those at the highest level of government" and that they could number up to 400. Shabaev, who is a campaigner for veterans rights claimed he had been told about the trip by relatives of the mercenaries. Other sources meanwhile claimed that they were much smaller and one source said that the mercenaries arrived in advance of the presidential election in May 2018 while another group arrived "recently". A month later, Russia, along with China vetoed a United Nations Security Council resolution calling for new presidential elections in Venezuela.

In March 2019, two Russian military planes landed in Caracas. A local journalist said he saw about 100 troops and 35 tonnes of equipment loaded off and that General Vasily Tonkoshkurov escorted soldiers out of one. The planes were one An124-100 while the other was an Il-62M. The spokeswoman for Russian foreign ministry, Maria Zakharova, said that the people were specialists that was there for bilateral "military technical agreement" and would remain as long the Venezuelan government desired. Russian media platform Sputnik claimed that they were there to "fulfill technical military contracts". The deployment was condemned by the US department of State, US special envoy to Venezuela, Elliott Abrams and President Donald Trump who said the US was keeping all avenues open on how to make Russia leave Venezuela and said "Russia has to get out" during a meeting in the Oval Office with the wife of Juan Guaidó, Fabiana Rosales.

In January 2020, Russia congratulated the election of Luis Parra as the next president of the National Assembly. The Russian Foreign Ministry said that the election contributes to the return of the intra-Venezuelan political struggle to the constitutional field that will find a peaceful exit to the ongoing crisis. In response, opposition deputies denounced that Russia looked after supporting Parra to improve its businesses in Venezuela, including to increase the Russian shareholder participation in oil contracts and other mining concessions that need the approval of the National Assembly and that it would not have with Guaidó.

On 23 February 2022, Maduro voiced his backing of Putin following Russia's recognition of Donetsk PR and Luhansk PR. Maduro claimed that he examined ways trough diplomacy to reduce tensions while saying that Putin was attempting to safeguard peace in the region. He also expressed a belief that Russia would be "coming out of this battle even more united" and saying again that he backed every try to resolve the conflict with diplomacy as he claimed Ukraine virtually was a colony of the US and Europe.Russia then launched an invasion of Ukraine one day later. The invasion received widespread international condemnation; Maduro, however expressed his "strong support" for Russia in a phone call with Putin and condemned the sanctions Western nations imposed on Russia.

Russia supported Maduro's claim of victory in the contested 2024 Venezuelan presidential election. Troops with patches of the Wagner Group were also seen among Venezuelan security forces during protests against the regime in the aftermath of the rigged elections. This promted worry about foreign involvement in Venezuela internal affairs.

According to CNBC, Russia's "most prominent" Latin American relationship is with Venezuela. Conversely, Venezuela's primary geopolitical ally is Russia.

Venezuela was reported to have extradited two Colombian members of Ukraine’s military to Russia after they flew from Ukraine to Colombia via Caracas.

Between May 7-9 2025, Maduro visited Moscow where he attend the Victory Day parade and signed a 10 year strategic partnership agreement with Putin. The agreement would include among other things opposition to unilateral sanctions, working together to explore and develop new fields of oil and natural gas, finding ways to boost output from existing oil fields ran by joint ventures. They also agreed to expand their oil trade under terms that benefits both sides and advance their cooperation in the energy sector, particularly regarding generation and transmission of electricity. Maduro ratified the treaty on 8 October and Putin did the same on 27 October.

In mid-October 2025, the Venezuelan transportation minister, Ramón Celestino Velásquez, reportedly handed over a written request from Maduro to Putin while visiting Moscow asking for Russian military support in light of the US military buildup in the Caribbean. The request reportedly included help to strengthen Venezuela's air defense systems, including sending 14 missile units and the restoration of several Russian-made Sukhoi SU-MK2 previously purchased by Venezuela. The letter also asked for renovations of eight engines and five radars in addition to undefined logistical support. The Su-30 jets were described in the letter as the Venezuelan government's most important deterrence in the threat of war along with an request of a medium-term financial plan of three years via Russian state defense conglomerate Rostec, still the amount was unspecified. It's unknown if Russia answered to the request.

On October 23, Maduro publicly boasted about Russian made anti-aircraft missiles he claimed Venezuela had deployed around the country stating "Any military power in the world knows about the Igla-S and Venezuela has no less than 5000 of them".

In November 2025, responding to US provoking maneuvers on Caribbean region, Russia slammed "excessive military force" of American Navy overreach their territorial waters and backed the Venezuelan government in defending its national sovereignty, while considering military aid to help Caracas.

On 28 October 2025, a Russian transport aircraft of type Il 76 with ties to Russias military and the former Wagner mercenary Group landed in Caracas after numerous stops is Russia friendly countries consistent of wanting to avoid Western airspace and potential cargo checks in unfriendly countries. It's also possible that pick ups or deliveries were made along the way. The operator of the aircraft, Aviacon Zitotrans, is under sanctions by the US, Canada and Ukraine for its ties to the Russian military and is known to have transported military equipment to places where the Wagner Group has operated.

On November 4 2025, senior Russian lawmaker in the lower parliament defense committee, Alexei Zhuravlyov, said that Russia continued to supply arms to Venezuela amidst its escalating tensions with the US and threatened to supply Oreshnik and Kalibr missiles. He also said they already had supplied several battalions of S-300VM (Antey-2500) surface to air missiles as well as Buk-M2E and Pantsir S1 systems to Venezuela. Pantsir S1 systems had previously not been part of the Venezuelan arsenal. He pointed out that the scope and details of the deliveries remained classified but hinted that "the Americans might be in for some surprises". Zhuravlyov also said that Russia is Venezuelas key military-technical partner and delivers a full range of weapons from small arms to combat aircraft.

On December 9 2025, Putin and Maduro had a phone call where Putin reiterated his backing of Maduro's government amid rising tensions with the US. They both also reasserted to systematically carry out collaborative projects covering multiple spheres.

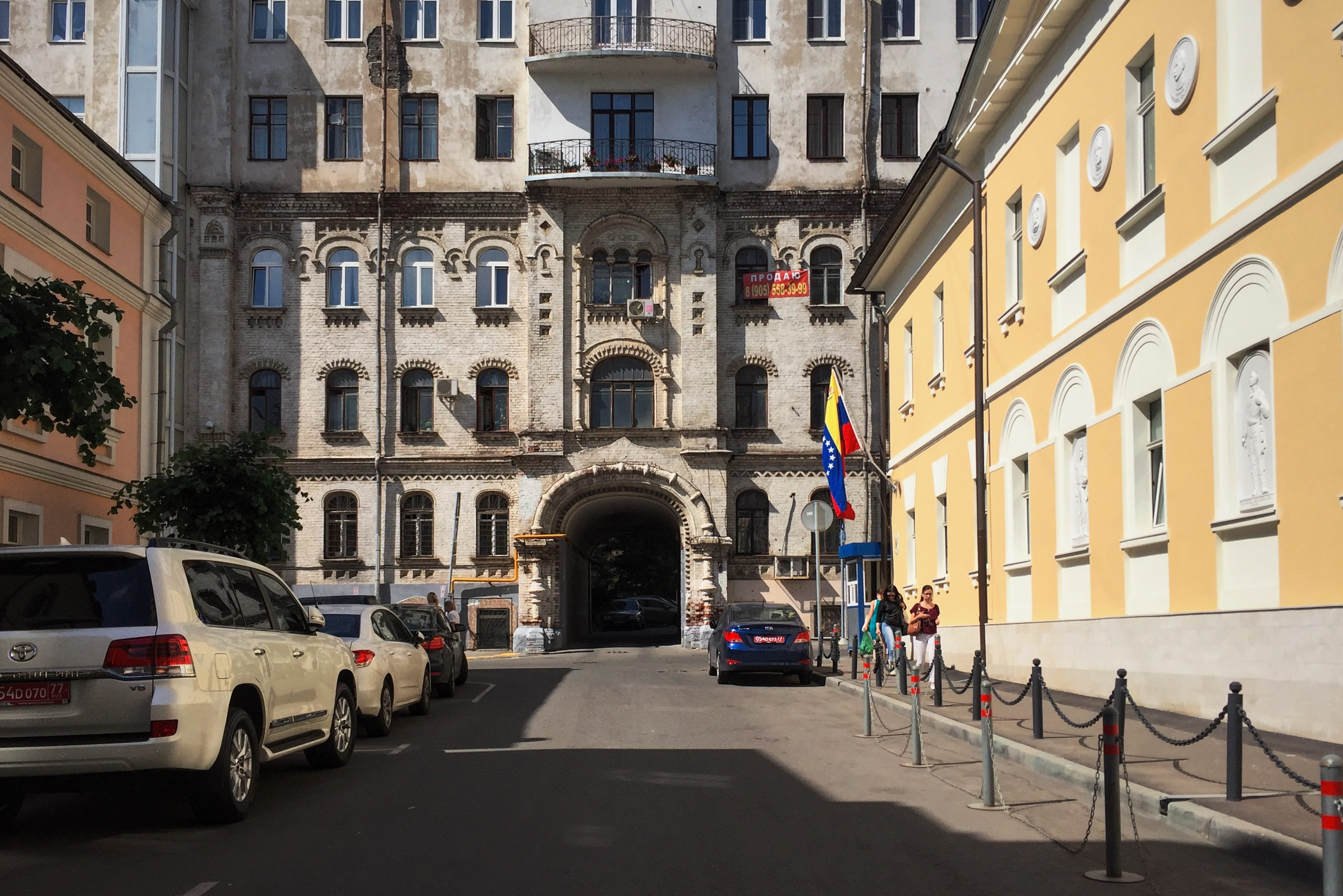
Embassy of Venezuela in Moscow

On 12 January 2026, The New York Times reported that Russian air defenses supplied to Venezuela failed to stop the US operation to capture Maduro on 3 January in part because they were for the most part non-operational with the systemets not even connected to radar. It was further reported that the systems were not linked to each other and could have been deactivated for years. Core elements of these systems were still in storage and not positioned while the US seems to have intentionally targeted locations were Russian Buk missile systems were held or stationed. US officials said that the reason Venezuela had a hard time preserving its Russian made air-defenses was due to its lack of Russian specialists and spare parts as they were being diverted to Russias own war in Ukraine. Two former US officials even speculated that Russia may even intentionally allowed the systems to worsen as to avoid a graver clash with the US

On January 4, 2026, following the capture of Nicolas Maduro by US forces, Russia was one of the countries that supported Maduro.

== Resident diplomatic missions ==
- Russia has an embassy in Caracas.
  - List of ambassadors of Russia to Venezuela
- Venezuela has an embassy in Moscow.

== See also ==
- Russian Venezuelans
