= Greece–Venezuela relations =

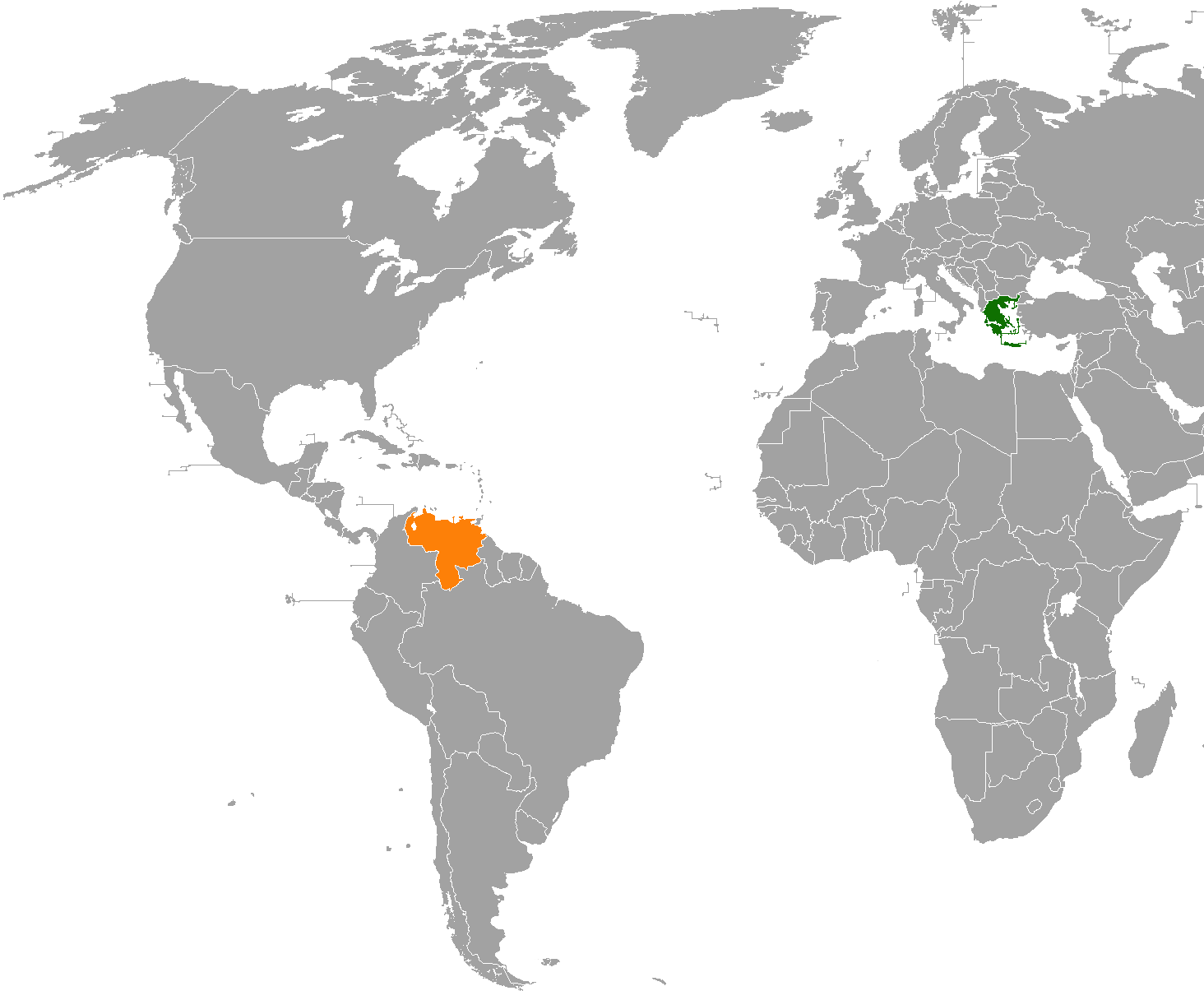
- Greece: Venezuela

Greece–Venezuela relations are the bilateral relations between Greece and Venezuela. Greece has an embassy in Caracas. Venezuela has an embassy in Athens. Both countries are full members of the United Nations.

== Diaspora ==
Data of Consular Office in Venezuela estimates that the Greek community has an approximate population of 3000 people, with the majority working in trade, financial and business activities. There are organized Greek communities mostly in Caracas and smaller ones in Valencia, where the Greek language is taught and Greek Orthodox churches operate.

== Recent relations ==
In February 2019, the Greek government, led by prime minister Alexis Tsipras, refused to follow most of the Western world, refusing to recognize opposition leader Juan Guaido as interim president of Venezuela. In July 2019, the centre-right successor of Tsipras, Prime Minister Kyriakos Mitsotakis, recognized Venezuelan opposition leader Juan Guaido as the interim president of his country.

In August 2019, the Venezuelan Parliament, led by interim President of Venezuela Juan Guaido appointed Eduardo Massieu Paredes as Venezuelan Ambassador to Greece.

== See also ==
- Foreign relations of Greece
- Foreign relations of Venezuela
- Greeks in Venezuela
