= Moreno Venezuelans =

Venezuelan ethnic group

Venezolanos morenos (Spanish)
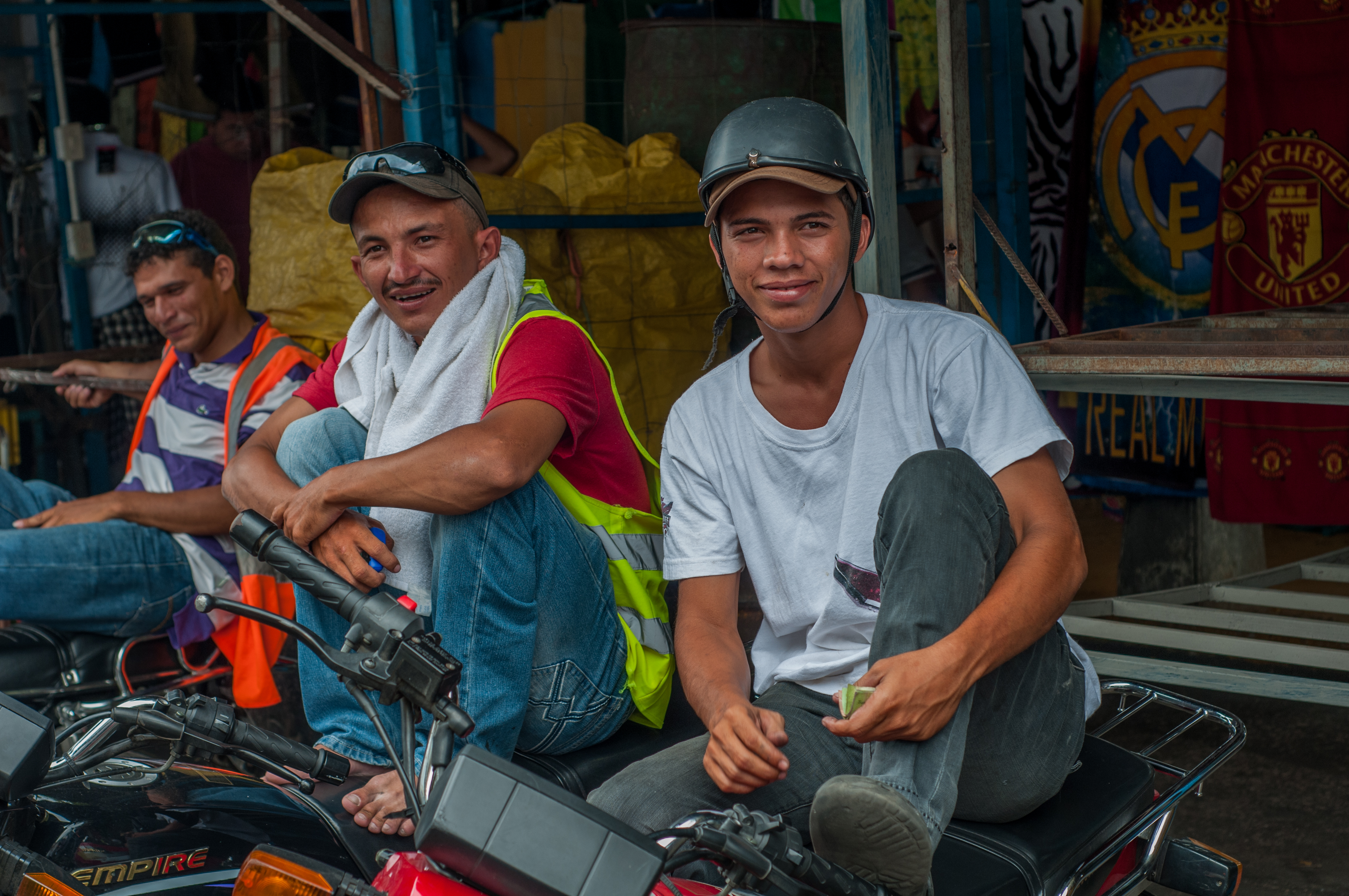
- Venezuelan motorcycle-taxi drivers

Total population
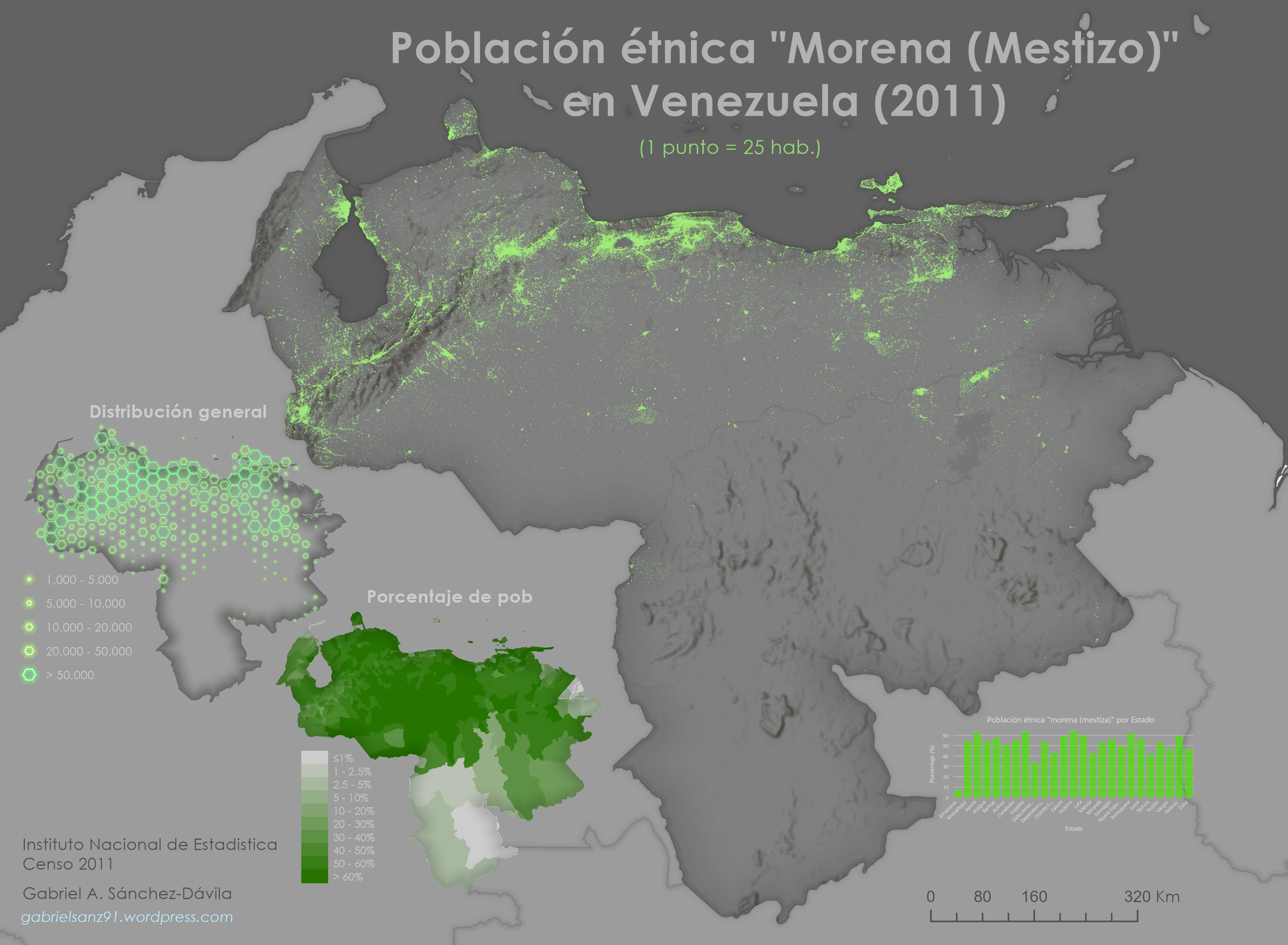
- Mixed ancestry predominates 15,586,454 (2011 census); 51.6% of the Venezuelan population

Regions with significant populations
- Throughout Venezuela

Languages
- Venezuelan Spanish; Small minorities speak Italian, Portuguese, Arabic, English, German, and French

Religion
- Christianity

Related ethnic groups
- Other Venezuelans: White Venezuelans · Black Venezuelans · Native Venezuelans

Moreno Venezuelans (Spanish: Venezolanos morenos) or Mixed Venezuelans (Spanish: Venezolanos mixtos/Venezolanos mestizos) are Venezuelans who tend to be multiracial, typically those who are genetically intermediate between Europeans, Amerindians and/or Africans. They were also known as mulattos, mestizos, pardos, and zambos. Some Moreno Venezuelans may also be mixed with Asian ancestry (Chinese, or Indian), although this is not as common.

Since the concept of "race" in Venezuela is rather fluid, there is no defined boundary to what is and is not Moreno. Many self-proclaimed White and Black Venezuelans have some degree of Moreno ancestry.

In terms of mere physical description, Moreno can be used to describe Indigenous Venezuelans because of their brown complexions.

Moreno may occasionally apply to olive-skinned people of Mediterranean or Canarian origins but it is not very common.

Moreno or the diminutive Morenito can be used to describe Blacks in a less racial connotation.

Simón Bolívar in his letters to Francisco de Paula Santander, described his fear that the majority of the mixed-race population, whom were already legally free men before the War of Independence, would conspire against and dethrone Bolívar’s new Elite that was still mostly "Whites" and form a “Pardocracia”.

General Manuel Piar was an example of a legally “pardo” person who passed completely as "White", but on every legal term he was still a Pardo.

Other important figures in the Venezuelan army of independence were also of mixed race, such as Judas Tadeo Piñango, José Florencio Jiménez, and José Laurencio Silva, the latter married to María Felicia Bolívar Tinoco, Simón Bolívar’s cousin.

Despite being a majority of the population, only a handful of Venezuelan presidents have been multiracial. The first was Juan Vicente Gómez, Rufino Blanco Fombona in “Judas Capitolino” described Gómez as having “a dirt-like complexion, with dark, small and chinky eyes, protuding cheekbones and a short forehead”. All of these features pointed out in an attempt to shame Gómez for being a mestizo.

Hugo Chávez was quite vocal about his mixed ancestry; his family is of African, Amerindian, Italian and Spanish origins. His successor Nicolás Maduro is of Jewish and Pardo origins.

Per an autosomal DNA genetic study conducted in 2008 by the University of Brasília (UNB), Venezuela's gene pool is composed of 61% European contribution, 23% indigenous contribution, and 16% African contribution.

== Census ==
According to the 2011 Census, people who identify as Moreno amount to 51.6% of Venezuela's population.

The Census of Venezuela classifies the population as:

- Black
- Afro descendant
- Moreno
- White
- Other

== See also ==
- Demographics of Venezuela
- Mestizo
- Mestizo Colombian
- Pardos
