= Slovene Venezuelans =

Ethnic group

Venezuelans of Slovene descent Venezuelski Slovenci Esloveno Venezolano
Total population
- 1,000

Regions with significant populations
- Greater Caracas, Valencia, Maracay, Maracaibo and Acarigua

Languages
- Slovene, Venezuelan Spanish

Religion
- Catholic with a Lutheran minority

Related ethnic groups
- Slovene diaspora

Venezuelans of Slovene descent, also Slovene Venezuelans (Slovene: venezuelski Slovenci) number around 1,000.

== History ==
The first Slovenians arrived in Venezuela between the two world wars, although in a small number, estimated at 50 people. After World War II, a small Slovenian community of about 500 members formed, which settled between 1947 and 1953, mostly from the Littoral. This emigration was motivated by the dissatisfaction with the economic conditions and partly with the political conditions, and by existing ties with Slovenes in Venezuela. Based on different sources and testimonies, it is estimated that up to 1960 between 550 and 800 Slovenians arrived in Venezuela.

Most of the Slovenes settled in Caracas and in smaller numbers in Valencia, Maracay, Maracaibo, and Acarigua. In 1958 the Slovenian priest Janez Grilc arrived in Venezuela from Argentina, who proved to be an excellent organizer. That same year masses in Slovene began, and also pilgrimages with marked national qualities, followed the social and cultural gatherings. In 1966, the Sv. Ciril in Metod association was formally founded in Caracas, "whose events were between 100 and 150 people. They organize pilgrimages, during Saint Nicholas Day and the commemoration of the independence of Slovenia. At that time, they formed the Asociación Eslovena (Slovenian Association), which is still active and which holds an annual gathering in Valencia in which a pilgrimage is carried out and a mass is offered. Due to the small number of Slovenian residents, a cultural center of their own did not exist, and so they participated in the events and celebrations of the Hogar Croata de Caracas (Croatian Club).

Starting in April 1959, the newspaper Življenje - Vida was published, with religious and informative themes.

== Notable people ==
- Ladislav Blatnik (1933–1986), shoe entrepreneur
- Janez Grilc (a.k.a. Juan Grilc, 1926–1997), priest
- Princess Tatiana of Greece and Denmark (born 1980)
- Danilo Žerjal (1919–1984), discus thrower and hammer thrower

== See also ==
- Slovene diaspora
- Immigration to Venezuela
