= Spanish immigration to Venezuela =

Spanish Venezuelans
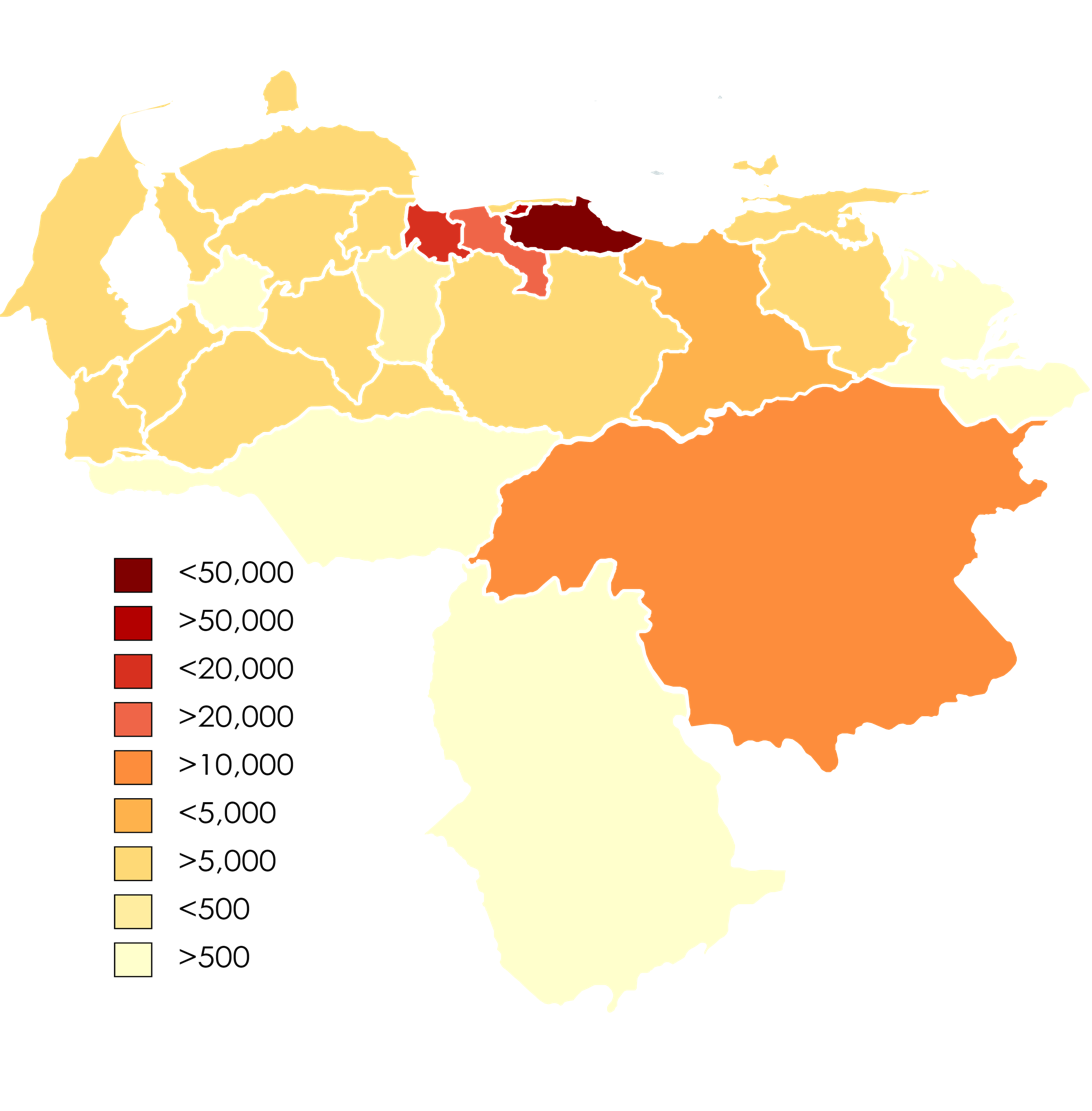

Regions with significant populations
- Miranda: 72.923 Spaniards Distrito Capital: 44.201 Spaniards Carabobo: 19.669 Spaniards

Languages
- Venezuelan Spanish; Minorities of Catalan, Basque, Galician, Valencian, Aragonese, Occitan, and Asturleonese speakers

Religion
- Predominantly Roman Catholic

Related ethnic groups
- Spaniards including Criollo people, Canary Islanders (Isleño), and Peninsulares

Spanish Immigration to Venezuela began around 1500, when the Spanish first landed on and conquered the territory, and immigration continues to the present day. There are many Venezuelans of Spanish origin, especially from the Canary Islands (known as Isleños). And by this event, most White and multiracial (Moreno, Pardo, Mestizo, and Mulatto) Venezuelans have Spanish ancestry.

Spanish immigration to Venezuela begins with the Spanish colonization of the Americas and it continued during Colonial Venezuela and after independence (1830). Further immigration has taken place since, particularly following at the start of World War II and during the Francoist dictatorship.

== History ==
From the beginning of the colonial period and until the end of the Second World War, most European immigrants in Venezuela were Spanish, predominantly Canary Islanders. Their cultural impact was significant, influencing both the development of Castilian Spanish in the country as well as its cuisine and customs. Venezuela has perhaps the largest population of Canarian origin, and it is commonly said in the Canary Islands that "Venezuela is the eighth island of the Canary Islands." In the 16th century, the German conquistador Georg von Speyer in the Canary Islands recruited 200 men to colonize Venezuela, as did Diego Hernández de Serpa, governor of New Andalusia Province, who sent another 200 soldiers and 400 slaves from Gran Canaria to Venezuela, where some of these Canarians were among the founders of Cumaná.

From 1936 onwards, the majority of Canarian immigrants opted for relocation to either Cuba or Venezuela, with some of those who moved to Venezuela originating from Cuba. This migration was actively promoted by the government, particularly targeting Spanish citizens. The trend continued until 1948, primarily favoring Venezuela. Although large-scale immigration persisted until the early 1980s, there was a notable decline in the 1970s, coinciding with the onset of Canarian emigration to various European countries. Presently, descendants of Canary Islanders are dispersed across Venezuela.

=== Political Refugees ===
In 1949, the CIA produced a paper concerning spanish republican immigration, as they were concerned of the recent activity in the country.

== Demographics ==
As of December 2014, there are more 231,833 Spanish citizens in Venezuela. As of January 2016, that figure reduced to 188,025 according to the spanish National Statistics Institute. In the same study, Venezuela ranked fourth in total immigration. One year later, immigration the country slowed down considerably.

== See also ==
- Isleño#Venezuela
- Venezuelans in Spain
- Spain–Venezuela relations
- Spanish diaspora
- Venezuelans of European descent
- White Latin Americans
