= Vanessa Neumann =

Venezuelan-American diplomat (born 1972)

Unofficial Ambassador of Venezuela to the United Kingdom
- Incumbent
- Assumed office 2019
- Appointed by: National Assembly of Venezuela
- President: Juan Guaidó

Personal details
- Born: 1972 (age 53–54) Caracas, Venezuela

Vanessa Neumann (born 1972, Caracas) is a Venezuelan-American diplomat, business owner, author and political theorist. Neumann is the president and founder of Asymmetrica, a political risk research and strategic communications firm headquartered in New York City and Washington, D.C. Neumann served for four years on the OECD's Task Force on Countering Illicit Trade, She is the author of the 2017 book Blood Profits: How American Consumers Unwittingly Fund Terrorists, as well as its 2018 Brazilian edition, Lucros de Sangue.

During the 2019 Venezuelan presidential crisis, a plenary session of the Venezuelan National Assembly approved her appointment as ambassador for the self-appointed President Juan Guaidó. She was appointed Ambassador and Chief of Mission for Venezuela to the Court of St. James's in the United Kingdom. The administration of Nicolás Maduro did not recognize Guaido's diplomats.

== Early life ==
Vanessa Antonia Neumann was born in Caracas, Venezuela to Michal Neumann (1947-1992) and Antonia Donnelly (1947-2015). Miguel Neumann was the son of entrepreneurs Hans and Milada Neumann, Jews who emigrated from Czechoslovakia to Venezuela in 1949. Antonia Donnelly de Neumann was an American of Irish and Italian descent. Neumann's grandfather, Hans Neumann, owned two newspapers in Venezuela: the English-language The Daily Journal, and Tal Cual. Mila Neumann was given the Order of Francisco de Miranda. Miguel Neumann founded Intercomunica, which produced a television series interviewing political leaders on the world stage and a series of books on Venezuelan cinema and culture. Miguel Neumann also owned the Spanish winery Vega Sicilia.

== Education ==
Neumann received a Ph.D. (2004) from Columbia University, where she submitted her doctoral dissertation, "Autonomy and Legitimacy of States: A Critical Approach to Foreign Intervention," under the tutelage of Rawlsian scholar Thomas Pogge.

== Professional career ==
While pursuing her doctorate, she volunteered for UNICEF, starting in 2001, raising funds from individual and corporate donors and travelling to Tanzania to coordinate with the local health administration on tetanus vaccinations. She has worked for the Foreign Policy Research Institute. At the Centre for Applied Philosophy and Public Ethics (CAPPE) in Canberra, Australia, in 2006, she supported Thomas Pogge's research into reform of the global institutional order for the alleviation of extreme poverty. While working as adjunct assistant professor of philosophy at Hunter College of The City University of New York, she was also an analyst at the International Institute for Strategic Studies in London, where she worked on armed conflict in Colombia. In 2013, the year Vanessa Neumann, Inc. became Asymmetrica, Neumann was the academic reviewer for the United States Special Operations Command (SOCOM) teaching text on counterinsurgency in Colombia.

Neumann's academic talks are centered on three areas of research: Venezuela, crime-terror pipelines, and foreign investment (particularly from China) in the Latin American energy sector. She wrote a 2017 article for The Daily Beast on illicit financial flows from Chinese counterfeiting.

Neumann is a commentator on politics and a vocal critic of the Hugo Chávez and Nicolás Maduro governments. She alleges that organized crime conducted by them is a cause of oppression in Venezuela. She supports US sanctions on Venezuela. Her book Blood Profits: How American Consumers Unwittingly Fund Terrorists has drawn support from exiled Venezuelan opposition leaders and she alleges that organized crime by the Maduro government is a cause of what she describes as an economic collapse and human rights violations in Venezuela.

Neumann has published articles in The Wall Street Journal, and The Daily Beast. She has appeared on CNN, CNNE and Fox Business. She was once introduced as a panelist by a Department of State official. Her written work has been used by the American Enterprise Institute.

=== Ambassador to the UK ===
During the 2019 Venezuelan presidential crisis, unsuccessful would-be president Juan Guaidó appointed Neumann as his Ambassador and Chief of Mission to the Court of St. James (the UK).

=== Return to the private sector ===
In November 2020, Neumann's LinkedIn profile was changed to reflect her return to the helm of Asymmetrica. Her resignation as Guaidó's ambassador to the UK appeared on page 2 of the December 1, 2020 edition of The Financial Times.

ON 4 February 2022, Neumann was appointed to the board of Tintra, a UK bank and fast growing regtech firm listed on the AIM market of the London Stock Exchange. In a 10 March 2022 interview with Finance Monthly, she discussed how biases and prejudices within the Western Financial System pose challenges for emerging markets and why she thinks advanced technology and AI, like Tintra is developing, is key to creating efficiencies and promote development.

== Personal life ==
Neumann dated Mick Jagger in 1998. Their relationship ended in 2002. She was later engaged to Scottish landowner William Stirling. Neumann married William Cash, son of Sir William Cash, a British Conservative politician and Member of Parliament for Stone. They divorced in 2010.

== Books ==
- Neumann, Vanessa Antonia (2004). Autonomy and Legitimacy of States: A Critical Approach to Foreign Intervention. Dissertation, Columbia University.
- Neumann, Vanessa (2017). Blood Profits: How American Consumers Unwittingly Fund Terrorists. St. Martin's Press. ISBN 978-1-250-08935-9.
- Neumann, Vanessa (2018). Lucros de sangue: Como o consumidor financia o terrorismo. Matrix Editora. ISBN 978-8-582-30500-3
