= Christiansen Academy =

School in Venezuela

Christiansen Academy (also known as Academia Christiansen or C.A.) was a private boarding school that provided an American-style education from kindergarten through grade 12 in Rubio, Táchira, Venezuela.

Operated by The Evangelical Alliance Mission (TEAM), the school opened in 1952 as a University-preparatory school, primarily intended for children of evangelical missionaries in the greater region of northern South America and the southern Caribbean, but it also educated many local, national and international students. The school taught its coursework primarily in English as well as in Spanish.

The academy closed in June 2001 in response to declining enrollment, as missionary focus moved away from rural areas into urban centers which offered more educational options for expatriate American children.
