= Ukrainian Venezuelans =

(Ukraine) Ukrainian Venezuelans (Venezuela) Ucraniano-Venezolano Венесуельські українці
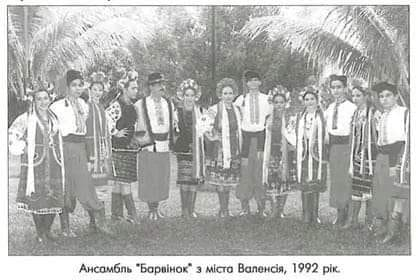
- Ensamble of Ukrainian Venezuelans in Valencia, Venezuela in 1992

Total population
- 10,000

Regions with significant populations
- Mainly Caracas and others.

Languages
- Spanish (Venezuelan Spanish), Ukrainian

Religion
- Mostly Catholicism and Eastern Orthodox

Related ethnic groups
- Ukrainian diaspora, Ukrainian Brazilians, Ukrainian Argentines, Ukrainians in Mexico

Ukrainian Venezuelans are Venezuelans of Ukrainian heritage. The Ukrainian diaspora increased after 1945 due to a second wave of political emigrants. In the latter half of the 1940s and early 1950s, these Ukrainians were resettled in many countries creating new Ukrainian settlements in Australia and Venezuela. In Venezuela the population is estimated to be around 10,000 Ukrainians.

== Notable people ==
- Ivan Belsky (1923-2003), painter and graphic artist.
- Lya Imber, (Odesa, Ukraine, 1914 - Caracas, 1981), the first woman in Venezuela to obtain the degree of Doctor of Medicine (Paediatrics & Child Care Specialist) and the first female member of the board of the Medical School of the Federal District.
- Sofia Imber, journalist.
- Aniuska A. Kazandjian, botanist and university professor.
- Stefanía Fernández Krupij, beauty pageant titleholder who won the Miss Venezuela 2008 and Miss Universe 2009 titles. She earned a Guinness record by being the first Miss Universe winner who was crowned by a compatriot.
- Vasyl Krychevsky, was a painter, architect, art scholar, graphic artist, and master of applied art and decorative art.

== See also ==
- Ukraine–Venezuela relations
- Ukrainian diaspora
