= Polish Venezuelans =

Polish Venezuelans Polscy Wenezuelczycy Polaco-Venezolano
Total population
- 130,000

Regions with significant populations
- Caracas, Maracaibo, Valencia, Maracay

Languages
- Predominantly in Spanish, minority speak Polish and/or Yiddish

Religion
- majority Roman Catholicism (Poles), minority are Orthodox and Judaism (Polish Jews)

Related ethnic groups
- Poles, Polish Brazilians, Polish Americans, Polish Canadians

Polish Venezuelans (Polish: Polscy Wenezuelczycy, Spanish: polaco-venezolanos) are Venezuelan citizens of full or partial Polish ancestry. The Polish colony in Venezuela is well dispersed throughout the country, but most of the Poles and their descendants live in big cities like Caracas, Maracaibo and Valencia.

== Polish immigration to Venezuela ==
In the 1630s, there were ideas being proposed between Duke Jacob Kettler and the King of the Polish–Lithuanian Commonwealth, John II Casimir Vasa for Curonian colonization of Venezuela. Polish ships had explored settlements within the Caribbean and tried on four occasions to establish a colony on the nearby island of Tobago, however the attempt of a colony failed and all plans to establish a colony in Venezuela faltered. In 1787, Polish King Stanisław August Poniatowski hosted future Venezuelan military leader and revolutionary, Francisco de Miranda for a few days in Kaniów (in present-day Ukraine) while Miranda was traveling Europe. During the Venezuelan War of Independence, several Polish officers served and fought for Venezuelan independence against Spanish troops. One Polish officer, Izydor Borowski fought for Venezuelan independence and was promoted to general by Simón Bolívar. Soon after Venezuela obtained independence, small numbers of Poles immigrated to Venezuela, many of them scientists, clergy, architects and engineers.

Polish immigration to Venezuela occurred in three stages, the first during World War II, when Polish citizens of Jewish origin were fleeing the Holocaust.

The second happened immediately after the war (years 1946–1948), when the Poles of Jewish origin who survived the war joined their relatives already established in Venezuela. In addition, many Polish soldiers who had fought in Britain, Germany and Italy or were prisoners in Nazi camps migrated to Venezuela. Others migrated also after the war from Europe (not from Jewish origins) escaping the Soviets and ended being successful architects, engineers, businessmen and extraordinary human beings. Many escape to Germany at the end of the war and waited for two or three years to get documents and travel permits to move to Latin America, many came to Venezuela during the period of 1948 - 1952.

The next wave of Polish immigration to Venezuela took place between 1957 and 1958 when a few hundred Polish citizens primarily of Jewish origin arrived. There were others who escaped from Poland during a communist crackdown (1947–1956).

== Current status ==
As for their profession and employment, the largest group among Poles in Venezuela is constituted by representatives of small family business. There are a considerable number of musicians, academics and doctors. Teodoro Petkoff Malec is a Venezuelan politician, ex-guerrilla, journalist and economist. One of the most prominent politicians on the left in Venezuela, Petkoff began as a communist but gravitated towards liberalism in the 1990s. The governor of Miranda state, Henrique Capriles Radonski, film director Jonathan Jakubowicz, and the writer Luis Zelkowicz are of Polish origin. In the sports world, Jimy Szymanski is a representative of Venezuela in tennis and Ricardo Wloka a jockey. Ilan Chester is a singer and composer. Mariano Kossowski and his brother Andrés Kossowski founded Promar TV in Barquisimeto, Lara State. Nina Novak prima ballerina is a dance national prize of 1996, Harry Abend, is a national prize winning sculptor, and Maria Magdalena and Andrzej Antczak are recognized archaeologists. Andres Gluski is CEO of AES. Ángel Rosenblat was a philologist, essayist and hispanist. Mieczysław Detyniecki is a painter. David Smolansky, politician, Voluntad Popular, former mayor of El Hatillo, Miranda State. Franco de Peña, film director. Gerardo Gerulewicz, pianist and composer. Two Polish Venezuelans have achieved considerable success in the Miss Venezuela. In 1996, Miss Venezuela for Miss World pageant was Ana Cepinska who then get the third place in the Miss World 1996 pageant in India. In 2003 one of the 10 finalists of Miss Venezuela was Francys Sudnicka, who later represented Poland in the Miss Universe 2006 (did not place) and Miss Earth 2006 (semi-finalist) pageants. Marius Sznajderman is a painter, printmaker and scenic designer. Eduardo Krulig, plastic surgeon. Pynchas Brener, former rabbi of Caracas, actual ambassador of Venezuela in Israel. Waclaw Zalewski was engaged as architect by Universidad de los Andes and MIT. The project "Polish Diaspora in Numbers /Polonia w Liczbach Wspolnota Polska" on Facebook is made by Monica Puerta de Pieslak, a Venezuelan.

== See also ==
- Poland–Venezuela relations
- Polish diaspora
- Ethnic groups in Venezuela
