= German Venezuelans =

Venezuelan citizens who descend from Germans

Total population
- 150,000 (of ancestry)

Regions with significant populations
- Colonia Tovar, Caracas.

Languages
- Spanish, German

Religion
- Roman Catholicism, Lutheranism, Eastern Orthodoxy

Related ethnic groups
- German people, German Americans, German Argentines, German Brazilians, German Canadians, German Chileans, German Mexicans, German Paraguayans, German Peruvians, German Puerto Ricans, German Uruguayans

German Venezuelans (German: Deutsch-Venezolaner; Spanish: Germano-venezolanos) are Venezuelan citizens who descend from Germans or German people with Venezuelan citizenship. Most of them live in Caracas, Maracaibo, Valencia, Colonia agrícola de Turén, El Jarillo, and Colonia Tovar where a small-reduced and decreasing minority of people speak the Colonia Tovar dialect, a German-derived dialect from their ancestry, and the Spanish language. In general, the descendants of Austrians, German-Swiss people, and German Italians (Italian citizens of German descent and speak German language) are also counted on this term.

== History ==
=== First colonization attempts ===
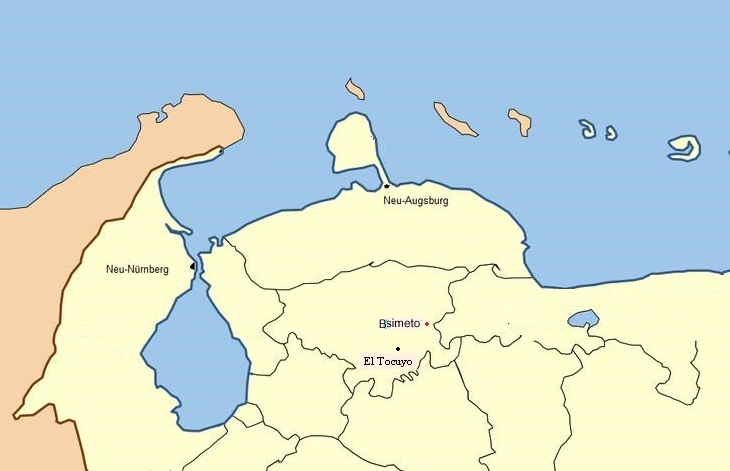
First settlements in Welserland/Klein Venedig

Charles V, Holy Roman Emperor and King of Spain granted rights to the Augsburg banking families of Anton and Bartholomeus Welser in 1528 to colonize Venezuela. By 1531, the Welsers controlled the privilege. They set up a colonization scheme and sent Ambrosius Ehinger as governor to Santa Ana de Coro (German: Neu-Augsburg), the capital of Klein-Venedig or Welserland (as it was known in Germany) in 1529. On October 7, 1528, Ehinger left Seville with the Spaniard García de Lerma and 281 settlers and they headed towards the Venezuelan coast, where they arrived on February 24, 1529, at the region of Santa Ana de Coro. From there, he explored the interior searching for the city of El Dorado, a legendary golden city, whose myth had been created by the Spanish through a misunderstanding of indigenous Muisca traditions combined with the European desire for wealth. The myth was fueled by stories of a Muisca ceremony where a chief was covered in gold dust and washed in a lake, misinterpreted by the Spanish as evidence of a city made of gold. On September 8, 1529 Ehinger founded the colony of New Nuremberg (German: Neu-Nürnberg), today known as Maracaibo. The aforementioned rights were revoked in 1546 by Emperor Charles V due to non-compliance with the stipulations. Many of the German settlers died from tropical diseases, to which they had no immunity, or hostile Indian attacks during frequent journeys deep into Indian territory in search of gold.

When Juan de Carvajal was founding El Tocuyo in 1545, Spaniards and some German-speakers (German, Flemish and Swiss that did not agree with the Welser government) headed to that new town. Conversely, those Germans, some of them marrying Spanish and aboriginal ladies, decided to use a Spanish surname instead of using a Germanic one.

After some intentions of Nicolaus Federmann, George Hohermuth von Speier to consolidate a German State in this land, and after the death of Bartholomeus Welser and Philipp von Hutten, that ended up with the death of Juan de Carvajal, the Council of the Indies determined to cease the German administration upon Venezuela in 1546, because the Welser did not fulfill the treat of establishing cities and fortress and bringing settlers.

In addition, there are two town known as Cuara. One to the south of "Valles de Quibor" where its inhabitants state out that they descend from those Welser settlers . The other "Cuara" today "Campo Elias" near to Urachiche in the State of Yaracuy, where inhabitants, though having aboriginal features, also have blue and green eyes, hazel or blond hairs, claiming that they also descends from those Welsers that came to Venezuela approximately 500 years ago.

There is a saying in Cuara Quibor about the first Venezuela President Jose Antonio Paez Herrera. It is said that his mother Maria Violante Herrera was born in that Larense town. She had as a nickname "La Catira de los ojos azules" (The blue-eyed creole blonde [The term "catira" is a feminine form of "catire", a Venezuelan slang of "blond."])

Governors, Mayors and Lieutenant-Governors between 1528 and 1556

Governors, Mayors and Lieutenant-Governors
1529 - 1530	Ambrose von Ehinger hispanicized as Ambrosio Alfinger
1530	Hans Seissenhofer von Key (due to the challenge of his name, he got a nickname Juan Alemán o Juan 'EL Bueno' . He was a captain and interim governor) (Tenente-Governador interino)
1531 - 1533	Bartholomeus Sayler hispanicized as Bartolomé de Santillana
1533	Ambrose von Ehinger hispanicized as Ambrosio Alfinger
1533 - 1535	Nicolas Federmann (Lieutenant-Governor of Coro after the death of A. Ehinger)
1535 - 1540	Georg Hohermut von Speyer hispanicized as Jorge de Espira
1540 - 1543	Heinrich Remboldt (Mayor of Coro and interim governor) He commanded "Juan de Villegas" to found Barquisimeto, however Villegas founded the city in 1552, 8 years after the death of Remboldt.
1543 - 1544	Philipp von Hutten hispanicized as Felipe de Utre ou Felipe de Hutten (Lieutenant-Governor)
1557 - ?	Melchior Grübel (Mayor of EL Tocuyo, and Coro interino)

German Toponomy of in the regional geography

- Posesión Federmann or Sabana de Federmann to the north of Barquisimeto, Lara.
- Quebrada de von Hutten, near to Vela de Coro and Puerto Cumarébo, Falcón.
- Alemán, 94 km to the west of Barquisimeto, Lara.
- Welsares a suburb in Cuara, to the southwest of Barquisimeto.
- Wohnsiedler, a square in Barquisimeto
- Frawenthal, a valley right to the south of Barquisimeto

=== Foundation of Colonia Tovar ===
After those first colonization attempts in the 16th century, Germans did not emigrate to Venezuela again until 1842. Between 1814 and 1842, some regions of Germany suffered heavy economic losses, while their inhabitants were paying high taxes. This caused great poverty in the country, which gave many Germans the desire to immigrate in order to escape poverty. To all this must be added that Germans had an excellent reputation as settlers. This positive image was created by pioneers in Brazil. On the other hand, Venezuela at the beginning of the 19th century, didn't have much political weight, so there was no fear or interference on their part.

During the second government of José Antonio Páez, the Congress enacted, in May 1840, a new immigration law which provided for a policy of economic and cultural exchanges between Venezuela and Europe. The entrepreneurs received loans on the condition that they accept immigrants over a period of two years. Given the huge population deficit that existed at that time in Venezuela, the Minister of Interior and Justice at the time, Angel Quintero, called for collaboration to Agustín Codazzi (traveler and geographer) so that he could indicate the lands eligible to attract European immigration in order to increase the productivity of the country. From the outset, Codazzi thought of Germany because of its economic situation. Along with Alexander Benitz, he began planning an organized immigration. Codazzi made explorations in various fields owned by the family Tovar, who had offered to donate them to establish a colony. So, Codazzi started a propaganda effort to get people to join the project and he chose families from the south of Germany, who then would travel to colonize the country. These families had to be masons, carpenters, blacksmiths, weavers, shoemakers and tailors. They came from the Grand Duchy of Baden and surrounding areas of (Germany), especially from Kaiserstuhl. These areas not only had many taxes, but also had problems related to agricultural productivity. These families left their country in 1842. Thus, on October 14, 1841, 374 people come formally to a Venezuelan port, founding the current La Colonia Tovar, with European structures and their particular lifestyle. He formed a company that had as partners Agustin Codazzi and Ramon Diaz, and as a guarantor to Martin Tovar y Ponte. That same year he began work on the land donated by Manuel Felipe Tovar, which would serve as home to German immigrants. Once in Tovar, it was found that of the eighty houses promised only twenty had been built. In addition, the assigned land had been deforested. Nor was there an access road. The administrator to the settlers exploited them for labor and prevented them from leaving the colony. This situation did not improve until 1845, when the government dismissed the administrator from office. Then, in 1852 the territory was transferred to the colony's families. Between 1858 and 1870, the colony was sacked twice, and once was completely destroyed by flames. From 1870, colonists began to successfully grow coffee. In 1877, Colonia Tovar had only 200 people living there. In 1920 they numbered 850.

=== German refugees in the Colonia Agrícola de Turén ===
During the Second World War, Germany experienced the Nazi persecution, the war, the Holocaust, the destruction of Germany and the postwar period that prompted some German immigration to Venezuela. Many of these Germans settled in this country specifically influenced by the testimonies narrated by the German scientist Alexander Humboldt about this country, where he spent most of his career in the 19th century. In 1949, a group of Venezuelan and German founded the Asociación Cultural Humboldt (in English: Humboldt Cultural Association), named in honor of this German scientist. This institution, works as a communicating vessel for relationships between Germany and Venezuela, particularly through cultural events. The Germans who came to Venezuela in the second half of the 20th century, mostly worked in German companies that were set on Venezuelan soil. The telecommunications, chemical, pharmaceutical, brewery industries were the most favored destinations, occupationally speaking, for these immigrants.

Additionally between 1951 and 1954, there were about 53 families of German origin (some from Bukovina) that were refugees in Colonia agrícola de Turén (State of Portuguesa) . They have farms and agriculture industries.

As a witness, they still maintain institutions in order to preserve their language and culture, for example the Lutheran Church that holds periodically mass services in German.

== Germans from the remote south of Brazil ==
There was an attempt of immigration of Teuto-Brazilians in the year 2000, some of German and Italian ancestry. It did not prosper and they returned to Ijuí Jóia and Augusto Pestana, the towns from which they had come.

== Demography ==
In Colonia Tovar, just a minority of its people speak the Colonia Tovar dialect, a German dialect said to be difficult to understand for native standard German speakers. Most of them have lost their language and culture over the years, keeping only some customs that have remained through programs to promote tourism in the region, considering it a differentiated area of Venezuela.

The Germans that arrived to Colonia Agrícola de Turén and the first generation of descendants still keep the language as they hold church masses at Lutheran Church in Turén.

== Education ==
German schools:

- Colegio Humboldt Caracas
- Colegio Alemán de Maracaibo
  - Formerly Colegio Aleman del Zulia
- Colegio La Esperanza in Valencia, Carabobo.

== Notable ==
- Daniela Avanzini, member of girl group Katseye
- Ileana Jacket, actress and dancer

== See also ==
- Germany–Venezuela relations
- German diaspora
- Immigration to Venezuela
