= Immigration to Venezuela =

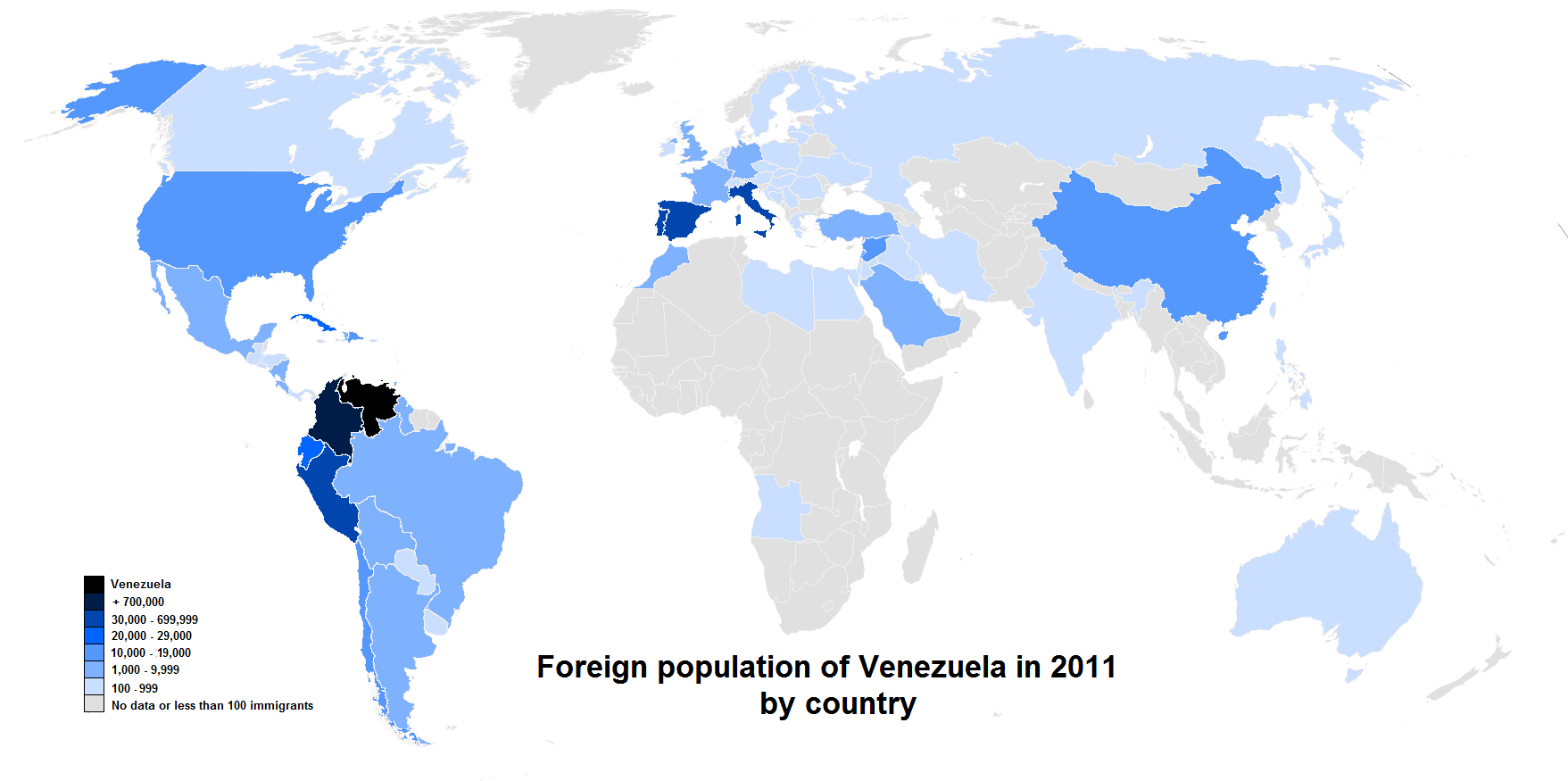

Immigration to Venezuela historically has been significant. Because of the Venezuelan geographical location as a gateway to South America, this nation has been the plot for many newcomers, even taking place before Columbus' discovery in 1498 when many aboriginal inhabitants came and left Venezuela. After the Spanish colonization of the Americas brought European colonists and African slaves, immigration to Venezuela was significant particularly in the period after World War II, with large numbers of immigrants from Asia and Europe, particularly southern Europe. In addition, Venezuela shares a 1000-mile border with Colombia and has long had substantial numbers of Colombian residents. Since the 1980s, the Colombian conflict has seen largescale Colombian immigration, with Venezuela the number one destination for displaced Colombians.

== Immigration under Spanish rule ==
European immigration in Venezuela began in 1500 with the Spanish colonization of Cubagua island to exploit abundant pearl oysters, enslaving the indigenous people and harvesting the pearls intensively. In 1514, Dominican friars founded Cumana, the oldest Spanish city still in existence in mainland America. Many Spaniards began their explorations searching for gold, while others Spaniards established themselves as leaders of the native social organizations, teaching natives the Christian faith and the ways of their civilization. Catholic priests would provide education for Native Americans that otherwise was unavailable. Within 100 years after the first Spanish settlement, nearly 95 percent of all Native Americans in Venezuela had died. The majority of the deaths of Native Americans were the cause of diseases such as measles and smallpox, which were spread by European settlers.

Out of all Spanish nationalities, the Castilians, Canarians, Catalonians, and the Basques were the most represented. Over time, Europeans intermarried often with the Amerindian peoples, and to produce a mixed-race population which are the majority of people in Venezuela today. Starting in the early 1500s, except the authorization of german settlers in Venezuela from 1527 to 1548, Spain discouraged non-Spaniard immigration to its colonies to prevent other European countries from asserting claims over the colony. Meanwhile, nearly 200,000 Africans were forcibly brought to supply labor to the agriculture and mining economy. (see Afro-Venezuelans)

== Nineteenth-century immigration ==
After independence in 1821, a lack of economic attractions and successive civil wars provided few incentives for immigration as Corsican immigration to Venezuela, with Corsicans playing a substantial role in the cocoa industry, German immigration included the founding of Colonia Tovar in 1843, and German traders played a significant economic role particularly around Maracaibo. By the turn of the nineteenth century and the Venezuela Crisis of 1902–1903, German traders dominated Venezuela's import/export sector and informal banking system.

== Caribbean immigration ==
Because of the Venezuelan geographical location as a gateway to South America, this nation has been the plot for many newcomers, even taking place before Columbus' discovery when many aboriginal inhabitants came and left Venezuela. During the later centuries African-descendants from the Caribbean islands entered Venezuela as immigrants. Among them Trinidadians, Cubans, Dominicans, Haitians, Dutch Antilleans, Martiniquens, Grenadians; in summary people from all the Caribbean nations. To summarize Antillian blacks coming even from British, Dutch and French Guianas.

=== Haitians in Venezuela ===
Haitians have left their legacy in the nation. In 1806, Francisco de Miranda design the first Venezuelan flag in Jacmel (South of Haiti). On December 24, 1815 the general Simon Bolivar first set foot on Haitian soil. The liberator in 1816 with 400 men all of them Haitians fought for the freedom cause reach Venezuela.

The immigration of Haitians can be organized into three phases. The first from the beginning of the 1960s to the beginning of the dictatorship of the Duvalier causing the wave of immigrants to Venezuela. Then, with the "boom" of the Venezuelan economy a greater flow of Haitian nationals entering Venezuela (from the Netherlands Antilles). In mid-1980 the last group enter directly from Haiti, settling down first in Caracas (Carapita, Antímano, San Martin, Catia and La Vega) to exercise duties as ice cream vendors, street vendors, and so on. They are as well in Valencia and Barquisimeto (San Juan and El Tostao). Many of them trilingual, they speak French, Haitian Creole and Spanish of Venezuela.

=== Guyanese in Venezuela ===
Illegally coming from the Esequibo.

=== Other Antilleans in Venezuela ===
Many women from West Indian Caribbean came to Venezuela to work at the wealthy American expats who worked at oil fields across Venezuela. Most of them settle in Cabimas, Maracaibo, Socorro among other towns. They were hired because most of those expats refused to learn or speak in Spanish and rejected to hire Venezuela ladies as servants. In this group several English-speaking Trininadian and Grenadian maids came to Venezuela.

== Post-war European immigration ==
After World War II, with Eduardo Mendoza Goiticoa in charge of immigration, substantial numbers of immigrants came from Europe, particularly southern Europe. As Secretary of Agriculture for Rómulo Betancourt's government, Mendoza headed the Venezuelan Institute for Immigration and embraced the creation of the International Refugee Organization in 1946 (this body was later replaced by the Office of the United Nations High Commissioner for Refugees). Mendoza succeeded, despite fierce opposition within the cabinet, in ensuring that Venezuela would aid European refugees and displaced people who could not or would not return to their homes after World War II and chose to emigrate to Venezuela. He assumed responsibility for the legal protection and resettlement of tens of thousands of refugees arriving in Venezuela. International Refugee Organization officials consider Mendoza to have directed the most successful refugee program in the post-war period. Immigration reached a peak while he was minister and would later decline with a new government.

== North Americans in Venezuela ==
=== Americans in Venezuela ===
Since late of the nineteenth century people from United States of America started to come to Venezuela. They were temporary immigrants. Evangelical missionaries, as well as preachers of other protestant groups, as well as oil engineers who came to work in Western Venezuela.
