= Táchira (disambiguation) =

Táchira is one of the 23 states of Venezuela.

Táchira may refer to:

- Táchira River, a river on the border between Colombia and Venezuela
- Deportivo Táchira Fútbol Club, a Venezuelan football club
- Vuelta al Táchira, a Venezuelan bicycle race
- Táchira emerald, a species of bird native to the state
