= Juan Vicente Pérez =

Venezuelan supercentenarian (1909–2024)

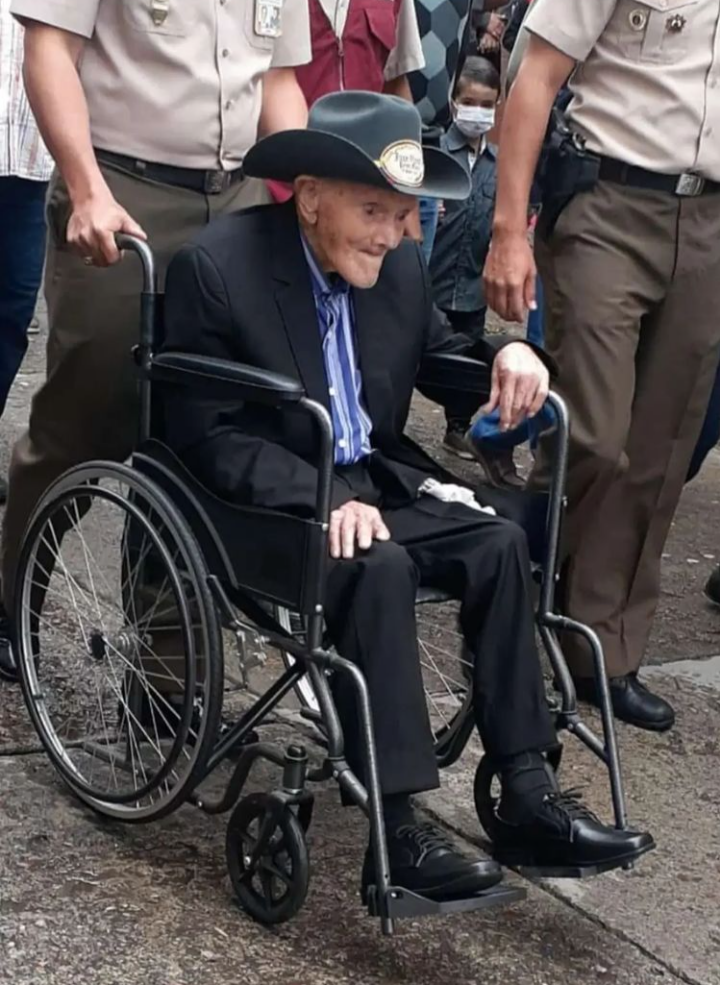
- Pérez on his 113th birthday in 2022
- Born: Juan Vicente Pérez Mora; 27 May 1909; El Cobre, Táchira, Venezuela
- Died: 2 April 2024 (aged 114 years, 311 days); San Jose de Bolívar, Táchira, Venezuela
- Occupations: Farmer; sheriff; construction worker
- Known for: World's oldest living man (18 January 2022 – 2 April 2024); Oldest Venezuelan ever (since 18 July 2020); Oldest verified man ever from South America (since 17 February 2024)
- Spouse: Ediofina del Rosario García (m. 1938; died 1997)
- Children: 11

Juan Vicente Pérez Mora (27 May 1909 – 2 April 2024) was a Venezuelan supercentenarian who, until his death aged 114 years, 311 days, was the world's oldest verified living man following the death of Spain's Saturnino de la Fuente García on 18 January 2022. He is currently the oldest validated person ever from Venezuela, the oldest verified man ever from South America as well as the fourth-oldest validated man ever.

== Biography ==
=== Early life ===
Pérez was born on 27 May 1909 in El Cobre, Venezuela, as the ninth child of Eutiquio Pérez and Edelmira Mora. In his early youth, his family moved to Los Paujiles in San José de Bolívar, Táchira, to work in agriculture. He mainly worked in harvesting sugar cane and coffee. He became literate from a book handed to him by his teacher, who became ill very soon after Pérez enrolled in school. In 1938, he married Ediofina del Rosario García (1916–1997), and they had six sons and five daughters in total, the first of whom, José Juan (1939–2013), was born in Los Paujiles.

=== Work ===
Aged 31, he and his wife moved to the town of Caricuena to buy a farm and he worked alongside his brother Miguel Arcángel. The rest of his children were born there. He became a sheriff of Caricuena in 1948 and his main job was resolving land and family disputes. In the late 1950s, Pérez was hired to work on the construction of the highway between San José de Bolívar and Queniquea. Due to the lack of machinery, he used a pick and shovel. He was paid two bolívars a day and if all work was not finished in one day, he was not paid until the next. His first known identification document was obtained in 1963. Sometime in the 1960s, he sold his farmland in Caricuena to buy property in San José de Bolívar, where he resided for the rest of his life. He was a life-long devout Catholic.

=== Later life ===
His wife died in 1997 after nearly 60 years of marriage, and thereafter his home and family were mainly cared for by his daughter Edilia del Carmen until her death in 2006. Aged 109, he was cheated out of a pension, though this was quickly resolved. As of his 111th birthday on 27 May 2020, six of his children (three daughters and three sons) were still living. He had 41 grandchildren, 18 great-grandchildren, and 12 great-great-grandchildren.

=== Death ===
Pérez died at his residence in San José de Bolívar, Táchira, on 2 April 2024, aged 114 years and 311 days. Venezuelan President Nicolás Maduro paid tribute to him on X (Twitter), and Omas Rojas, mayor of San José de Bolívar, declared three days of mourning and for all flags to be lowered at half mast.

== Health and longevity ==
=== Health and diet ===
In 2007, aged 98, Pérez had his dental prosthesis removed and began to use a wheelchair. Still, he was able to walk to some extent in his centenarian years.

When declared the oldest living man on 17 May 2022, it was reported that he lacked any notable health issues, and was very lucid, able to recall several aspects of his childhood. According to his family, his favourite foods were cake, mondongo, hallaca, and avocadoes. He was able to get into and out of bed with the aid of a bar beside it. He reportedly enunciated and had minimal hearing loss, with people having to speak loudly or be close to him. He credited his longevity to working hard, praying the rosary twice a day, and drinking a glass of miche (a type of aguardiente traditionally made from unrefined sugar cane blocks) every day.

=== Longevity ===
Pérez was first reported as Venezuela's oldest living person in May 2020. He became the oldest known Venezuelan ever on 18 July 2020, when he surpassed Carmen Pacheco de Carrasco (1901–2013), who died aged 111 years, 51 days. His age was validated by Latin American Supercentenarians (LAS) on 3 January 2021.

On 18 January 2022, upon the death of 112-year-old Saturnino de la Fuente García of Spain, Pérez became the world's oldest man. This was verified by Guinness World Records on 4 February, and announced on 17 May. His 113th birthday on 27 May 2022 was marked by a large celebration with his family, attended by many members of the community. Five days later, he became the last known man born in the 1900s decade, following the death of Italian-Brazilian man Delio Venturotti (25 October 1909 – 1 June 2022).

Pérez turned 114 in May 2023, becoming only the ninth verified man to ever do so and the first man to do so since Tomás Pinales Figuereo in 2020. This occasion was once again marked by a large celebration with many ecclesiastical elements, as well as visits from longevity researchers, local media, and town representatives.

Upon his death, he was succeeded as the world's oldest man by Chinese man Shi Ping (1 November 1911 – 29 June 2024). However, Shi's age claim was not yet verified at the time, so initially John Tinniswood (26 August 1912 – 25 November 2024) was thought to be the successor to Pérez. Tinniswood gained the title upon Shi's death.

== See also ==
- List of the oldest people by country
- List of the verified oldest people
