= Rafael Urdaneta Municipality =

Municipality in Táchira, Venezuela

Rafael Urdaneta Municipality Municipio Rafael Urdaneta
- Municipality
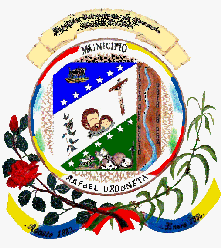
- Flag Coat of arms

- Location in Táchira

- Location in Venezuela
- Coordinates: 7°32′26″N 72°25′42″W
- Country: Venezuela
- State: Táchira
- Founded: 1994
- Municipal seat: Delicias

Government
  - Mayor: Raúl Villamizar (PSUV)

Area
  - Total: 177.6 km^{2} (68.6 sq mi)

Population (2011)
  - Total: 6,628
  - Density: 37.32/km^{2} (96.66/sq mi)
- Time zone: UTC−4 (VET)
- Area code(s): 0277

Rafael Urdaneta Municipality is one of the 29 municipalities that makes up the western Venezuelan state of Táchira and, according to the 2011 Venezuelean census, the municipality had a population of 6,628. The mayor of the municipality is Raúl Villamizar of the PSUV and Cordero is the municipal seat of the Rafael Urdaneta Municipality.
