= José María Vargas Municipality =

José María Vargas Municipality Municipio José María Vargas
- Municipality
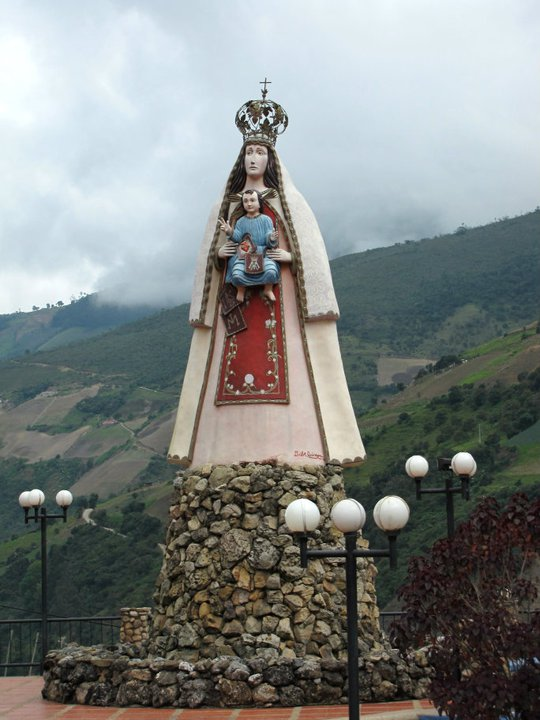
- El Cobre

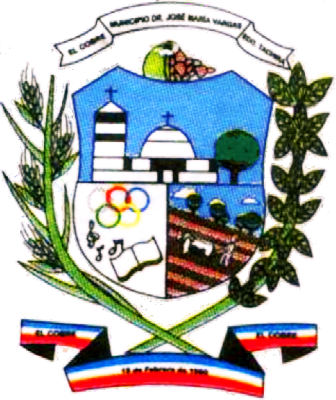
- Flag Seal

- Location in Táchira

- Location in Venezuela
- Coordinates: 8°01′N 72°05′W
- Country: Venezuela
- State: Táchira
- Municipal seat: El Cobre

Government
  - Mayor: Carlos Pérez Chacón (PSUV)

Area
  - Total: 85.0 km^{2} (32.8 sq mi)

Population (2011 -> 2019 projection)
  - Total: 10,230 -> 10,816
  - Density: 120/km^{2} (312/sq mi)
- Time zone: UTC−4 (VET)

José María Vargas Municipality is one of the 29 municipalities that makes up the western Venezuelan state of Táchira and, according to the 2011 Venezuelean census, the municipality had a population of 10,230. The mayor of the municipality is Carlos Pérez Chacón of the PSUV party since August 2025 and the town of El Cobre is the municipal seat of the José María Vargas Municipality.

== Demographics ==
Based on the 2011 Venezuelan census, The population of the José María Vargas Municipality was 10,230 people, accounting for 0.85% of the total population of the state of Táchira. Under half (43.9%) of the municipality's population is in the town of El Cobre, the municipal seat.

By June 2019, official projections from the Venezuelan Statistics National Institute estimated the population of José María Vargas as 10,816 people, representing an annual growth rate of 0.7% since 2011 and showing a population density of 127.2 inhabitants/km². However, these projections do not account for the impact of emigration linked to the country's recent economic and political circumstances.

The gender distribution of the population was 52.3% men (5,162) and 47.7% women (4,717). The age distribution showed that the largest segment of the population was aged 15 to 64, comprising 65.4% of the people. Younger people aged 0 to 14 made up 28.9% of the population, while those aged 65 and older accounted for 5.8%. The municipality is more rural than urbanized, with 56.1% of inhabitants (5,542) living in rural areas compared to 43.9% (4,337) in urban centers.

Ethnically, the municipality identified as predominantly White people (60%) and Mestizo (38.7%). Minority groups included 0.4% Afro-Venezuelans and 0.8% belonging to other ethnic groups. The literacy rate was 92.2%, with 623 inhabitants of José María Vargas not able to read or write.

== Government ==
The mayor of the José María Vargas Municipality is Carlos Pérez Chacón of the United Socialist Party of Venezuela (PSUV) party. He is a lawyer who majored in computer science. He was sworn in to office in August 2025.
