= Pedro María Ureña Municipality =

Pedro María Ureña Municipality Municipio Pedro María Ureña
- Municipality
- Flag Seal

- Location in Táchira

- Location in Venezuela
- Coordinates: 7°54′N 72°24′W
- Country: Venezuela
- State: Táchira
- Municipal seat: Ureña

Government
  - Mayor: Jhon Carrillo (PSUV)

Area
  - Total: 168.7 km^{2} (65.1 sq mi)

Population (2011 -> 2019 projection)
  - Total: 52,678 -> 56,142
  - Density: 312.3/km^{2} (808.7/sq mi)
- Time zone: UTC−4 (VET)
- Website: Official website

Pedro María Ureña Municipality is one of the 29 municipalities that makes up the western Venezuelan state of Táchira and, according to the 2011 Venezuelean census, the municipality had a population of 52,678. The mayor of the municipality is Jhon Carrillo of the PSUV party since December 2017 and the town of Ureña is the municipal seat of the Pedro María Ureña Municipality.

== Demographics ==
Based on the 2011 Venezuelan census, The population of the Pedro María Ureña Municipality was 52,678 people, accounting for 4.4% of the total population of the state of Táchira. Almost all (96.36%) of the municipality's population is in the town of Ureña, the municipal seat.

By June 2019, official projections from the Venezuelan Statistics National Institute estimated the population of Pedro María Ureña as 56,142 people, representing an annual growth rate of 0.8% since 2011 and showing a population density of 305.1 inhabitants/km². However, these projections do not account for the impact of emigration linked to the country's recent economic and political circumstances.

The gender distribution of the population was 49.8% men (25,821) and 50.2% women (26,058). The age distribution showed that the largest segment of the population was aged 15 to 64, comprising 68.1% of the people. Younger people aged 0 to 14 made up 27.1% of the population, while those aged 65 and older accounted for 4.8%. The municipality is almost entirely urbanized, with 96.4% of inhabitants (50,006) living in urban centers compared to just 3.6% (1,873) in rural areas.

Ethnically, the municipality identified as predominantly White people (58.1%) and Mestizo (39.2%). Minority groups included 0.9% Afro-Venezuelans, a small indigenous population of 4 individuals, and 1.8% belonging to other ethnic groups. The literacy rate was 96.2%, with 1,608 inhabitants of Pedro María Ureña not able to read or write.

== Government ==
The mayor of the Pedro María Ureña Municipality is Jhon Carrillo of the United Socialist Party of Venezuela, since his election in December 2017. He was re-elected for a third term in July 2025. The municipality is divided into two parishes; Nueva Arcadia and Pedro María Ureña.
