= Jáuregui Municipality =

Municipality in Táchira, Venezuela

Jáuregui Municipality Municipio Jáuregui
- Municipality

- Flag Seal

- Location in Táchira

- Location in Venezuela
- Country: Venezuela
- State: Táchira
- Founded: 1856
- Municipal seat: La Grita

Government
  - Mayor: Juan Escalante (PSUV)

Area
  - Total: 437.2 km^{2} (168.8 sq mi)

Population (2012)
  - Total: 100,112
  - Density: 229.0/km^{2} (593.1/sq mi)
- Time zone: UTC−4 (VET)

Jáuregui Municipality is one of the 29 municipalities in Táchira state, Venezuela. The municipality has a total surface of 454 km^{2} and it has some 100,112 inhabitants (2012 census). Its capital is La Grita.
