= La Fría =

- Coat of arms

- Location within Venezuela
- Coordinates: 08°13′08″N 72°14′54″W
- Time zone: UTC−4 (VET)

La Fría is a town in Táchira, Venezuela. It is the capital of García de Hevia Municipality. It was founded in 1853.

== Transport ==
It is served by La Fría Airport. It is proposed to have a railway station on the new national railway network.

== See also ==
- Railway stations in Venezuela
