= El Cobre, Táchira =

El Cobre
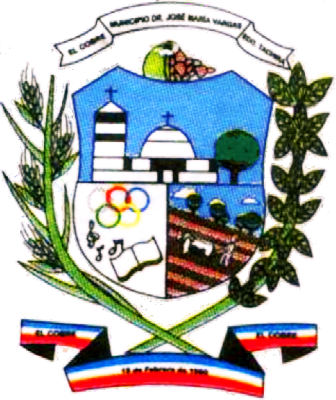
- Flag Coat of arms

- Location within Venezuela
- Coordinates: 8°2′9″N 72°3′27″W
- Country: Venezuela
- State: Táchira
- Municipality: José María Vargas
- Elevation: 2,105 m (6,906 ft)
- Time zone: UTC−4 (VET)
- Climate: Cfb

El Cobre is a town in the Venezuelan Andean state of Táchira. The town is the shire town of the José María Vargas Municipality.

== Notable person ==
- Juan Vicente Pérez (1909–2024), Venezuelan farmer and supercentenarian, former oldest living man, last man born in 1900s decade
