= Lobatera Municipality =

Municipality in Táchira, Venezuela

Lobatera Municipality Municipio Lobatera
- Municipality

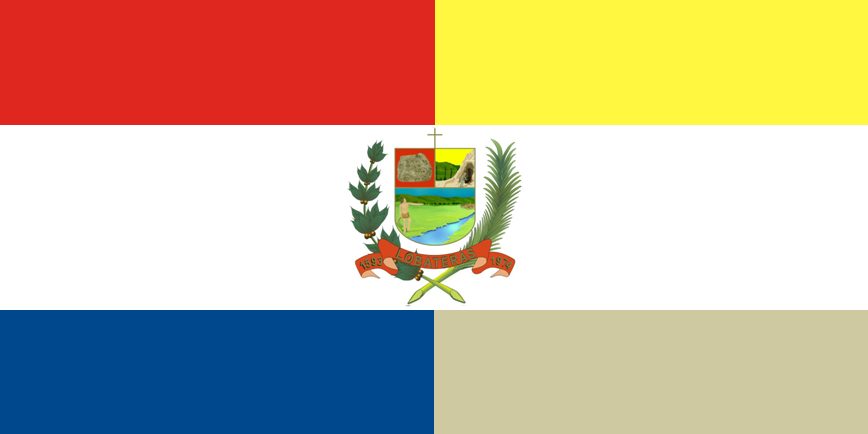
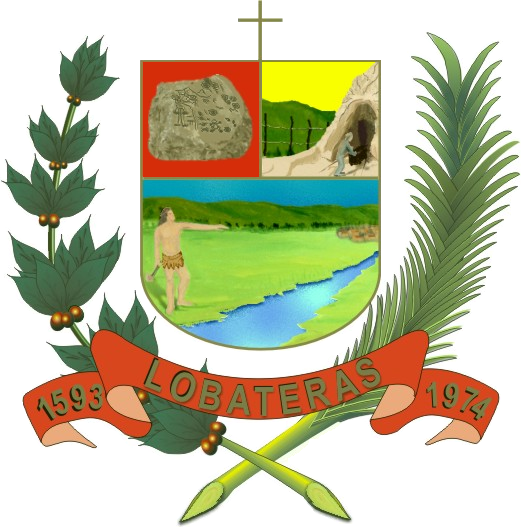
- Flag Seal

- Location in Táchira

- Location in Venezuela
- Country: Venezuela
- State: Táchira
- Founded: 1593
- Municipal seat: Lobatera

Government
  - Mayor: Natalia Chacón Padrón (PSUV)

Area
  - Total: 190.6 km^{2} (73.6 sq mi)

Population (2011)
  - Total: 11,158
  - Density: 58.54/km^{2} (151.6/sq mi)
- Time zone: UTC−4 (VET)

Lobatera Municipality is one of the 29 municipalities in Táchira state, Venezuela. The municipality has a total surface of 252 km^{2} and it has some 11,158 inhabitants (2011 census). Its capital is Lobatera.
