= García de Hevia Municipality =

Municipality in Táchira, Venezuela

García de Hevia Municipality Municipio García de Hevia
- Municipality

- Flag Seal

- Location in Táchira

- Location in Venezuela
- Country: Venezuela
- State: Táchira
- Founded: 1853
- Municipal seat: La Fría

Government
  - Mayor: Willington Vivas (PSUV)

Area
  - Total: 893.9 km^{2} (345.1 sq mi)

Population (2023)
  - Total: 61,568
  - Density: 68.88/km^{2} (178.4/sq mi)
- Time zone: UTC−4 (VET)

García de Hevia Municipality is one of the 29 municipalities in Táchira state, Venezuela. The municipality has a total surface of 910 km^{2} and it has some 61,568 inhabitants (2023 census). Its capital is La Fría.
