= Samuel Darío Maldonado Municipality =

Municipality in Táchira, Venezuela

Samuel Darío Maldonado Municipality Municipio Samuel Darío Maldonado
- Municipality
- Flag Seal

- Location in Táchira

- Location in Venezuela
- Country: Venezuela
- State: Táchira
- Founded: 1972
- Municipal seat: La Tendida

Government
  - Mayor: Eduardo Jaimes Cárdenas (PSUV)

Area
  - Total: 513.8 km^{2} (198.4 sq mi)

Population (2011)
  - Total: 16,398
  - Density: 31.92/km^{2} (82.66/sq mi)
- Time zone: UTC−4 (VET)

Samuel Darío Maldonado Municipality is one of the 29 municipalities in Táchira state, Venezuela. The municipality has a total surface of 533 km^{2} and it has some 16,398 inhabitants (2011 census). Its capital is La Tendida.
