= San Judas Tadeo Municipality =

Municipality in Táchira, Venezuela

San Judas Tadeo Municipality Municipio San Judas Tadeo
- Municipality
- Flag Seal

- Location in Táchira

- Location in Venezuela
- Country: Venezuela
- State: Táchira
- Founded: 1853
- Municipal seat: Umuquena

Government
  - Mayor: Jesús Pérez Gandica (UNICA)

Area
  - Total: 228.7 km^{2} (88.3 sq mi)

Population (2011)
  - Total: 7,523
  - Density: 32.89/km^{2} (85.20/sq mi)
- Time zone: UTC−4 (VET)

San Judas Tadeo Municipality is one of the 29 municipalities in Táchira state, Venezuela. The municipality has a total surface of 253 km^{2} and it has some 7,523 inhabitants (2011 census). Its capital is Umuquena.
