= Fernández Feo Municipality =

Municipality in Táchira, Venezuela

Fernández Feo Municipality Municipio Fernández Feo
- Municipality
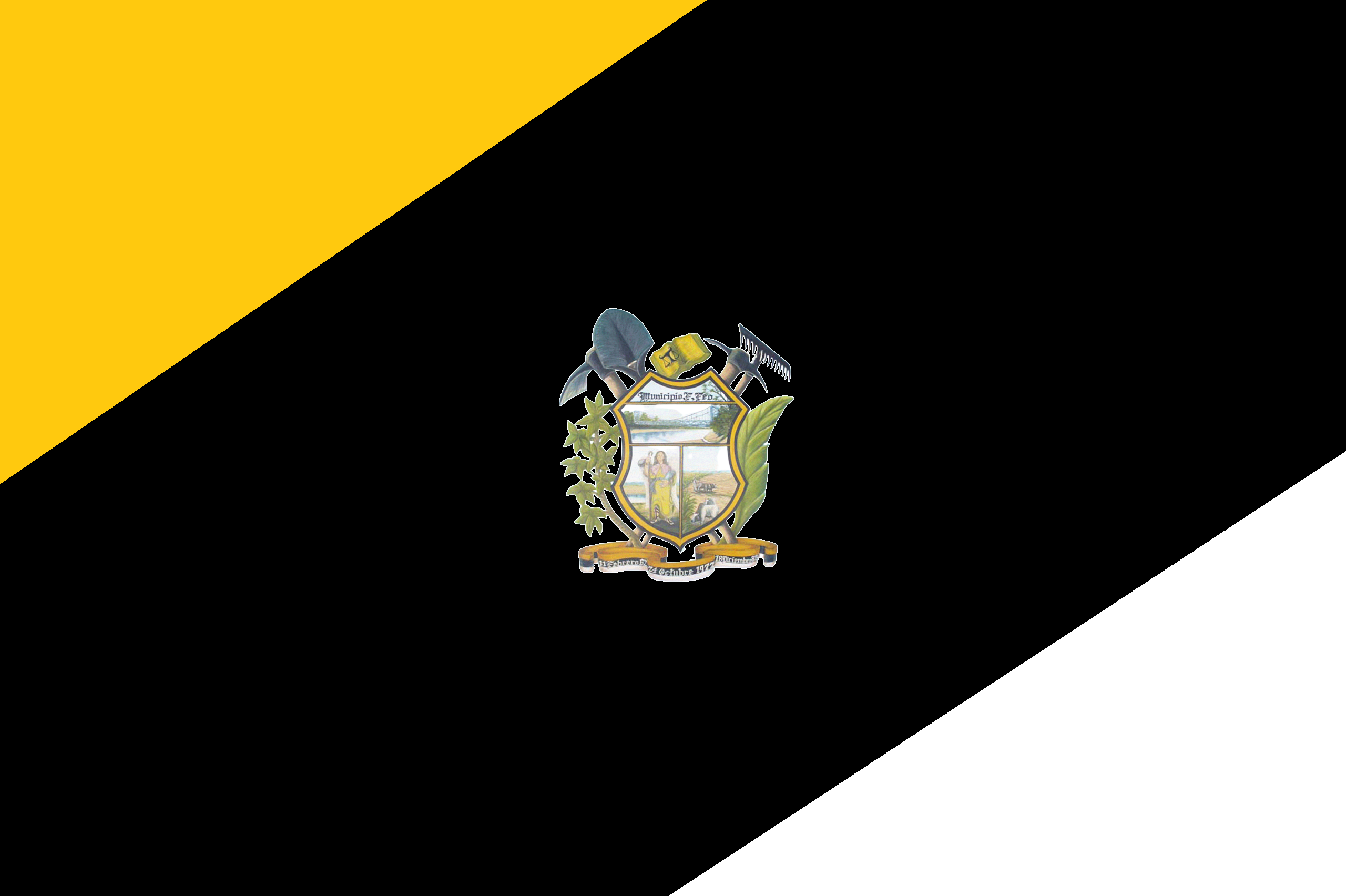
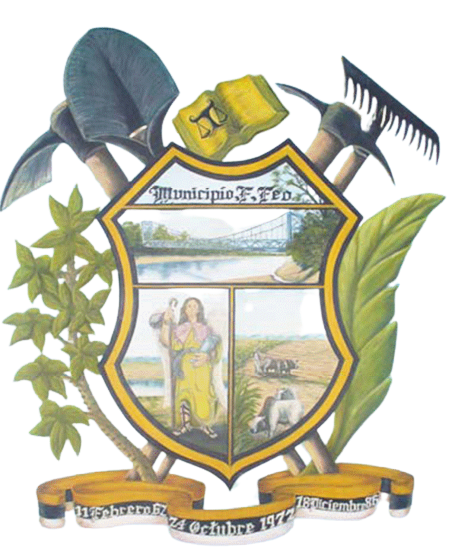
- Flag Seal

- Location in Táchira

- Location in Venezuela
- Country: Venezuela
- State: Táchira
- Founded: 1962
- Municipal seat: San Rafael del Piñal

Government
  - Mayor: Haylly Chacón (PSUV)

Area
  - Total: 1,023.0 km^{2} (395.0 sq mi)

Population (2011)
  - Total: 47,893
  - Density: 46.816/km^{2} (121.25/sq mi)
- Time zone: UTC−4 (VET)

Fernández Feo Municipality is one of the 29 municipalities in Táchira state, Venezuela. The municipality has a total surface of 1084 km^{2} and it has some 47,893 inhabitants (2011 census). Its capital is San Rafael del Piñal.
