= Palmira, Táchira =

- Flag Coat of arms

- Location within Venezuela
- Coordinates: 7°50′26″N 72°14′01″W
- Time zone: UTC−4 (VET)

Palmira is a town in Táchira, Venezuela. It is the capital of Guásimos Municipality. It was founded in 1627 by Fernando Saavedra and in 1642 by Captain Luis Sosa Lovera. In 2011, it had a population of 43.236.
