= Ureña, Táchira =

Ureña
- Coat of arms

- Location within Venezuela
- Coordinates: 7°55′6″N 72°26′48″W
- Country: Venezuela
- State: Táchira
- Municipality: Pedro María Ureña Municipality

Area
  - Total: 114 km^{2} (44 sq mi)
- Elevation: 310 m (1,020 ft)

Population (2011)
  - Total: 37,932
  - Density: 333/km^{2} (862/sq mi)
- Time zone: UTC−4 (VET)

Ureña is a city and the shire town of Pedro María Ureña Municipality, Táchira in Venezuela. It is located on the border with Colombia. The city was founded by Pedro María Ureña, having been elevated to the category of parish by means of the provincial law of December 4, 1851.
