= Delicias, Táchira =

Coordinates: 7°33′55″N 72°26′48″W

Las Delicias
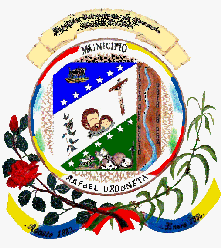
- Flag Seal
- Interactive map of Las Delicias
- Country: Venezuela
- State: Táchira
- Municipality: Rafael Urdaneta
- Elevation: 1,480 m (4,860 ft)

Population (2001)
  - Total: 6,224
- Time zone: UTC−4 (VET)
- Climate: Cfb

Las Delicias or Delicias is a town in the Venezuelan Andean state of Táchira. The town is the shire town of the Rafael Urdaneta municipality and, according to the 2001 Venezuelan census, has a population of 6,224. It is located on the Colombian border, 4 kilometres (2.5 mi) from the Colombian town of Ragonvalia.

Located high in the Venezuelan Andes, the town is characterized by rugged terrain and steep slopes. El Tamá National Park, one of the principal tourist attractions in the region, is located nearby.
