= Táchira =

Táchira Estado Táchira (Spanish)
- State
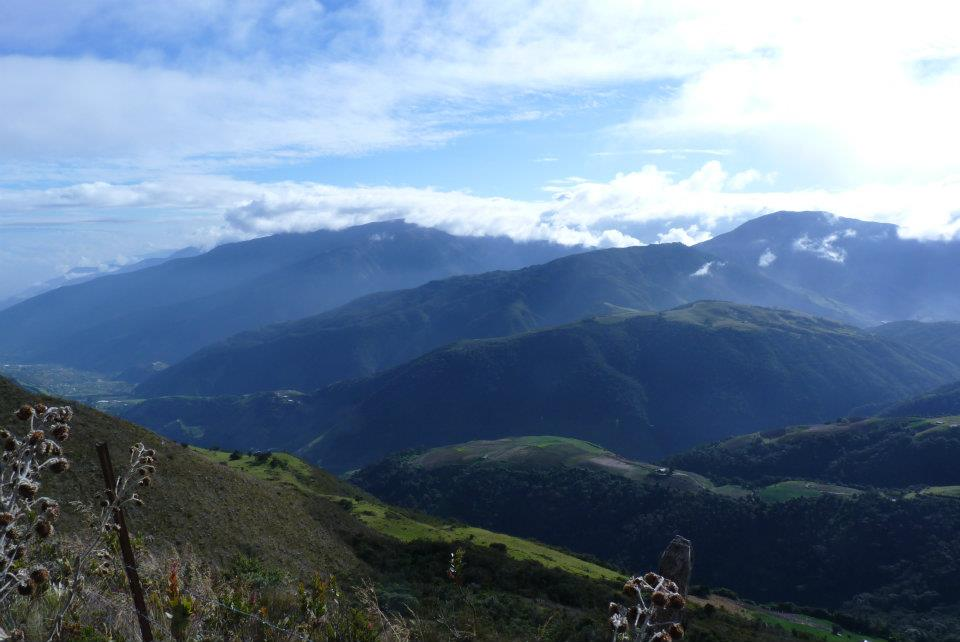
- General Juan Pablo Peñaloza National Park

- Flag Coat of arms
- Anthem: "Himno del Estado Táchira"
- Location within Venezuela
- Coordinates: 7.94°N 72.12°W
- Country: Venezuela
- Created: 1899
- Capital: San Cristóbal

Government
  - Body: Legislative Council
  - Governor: Freddy Bernal

Area
  - Total: 11,100 km^{2} (4,300 sq mi)
  - Rank: 16th
- 1.2% of Venezuela

Population (2011 census est.)
  - Total: 1,168,908
  - Rank: 9th
- 4.5% of Venezuela
- Time zone: UTC−4 (VET)
- ISO 3166 code: VE-S
- Emblematic tree: Pino Criollo, or Laso (Prumnopitys montana)
- HDI (2019): 0.709 high · 9th of 24
- Website: www.tachira.gob.ve

Táchira State (Spanish: Estado Táchira, IPA: [esˈtaðo ˈtatʃiɾa]) is one of the 23 states of Venezuela. The state capital is San Cristóbal.

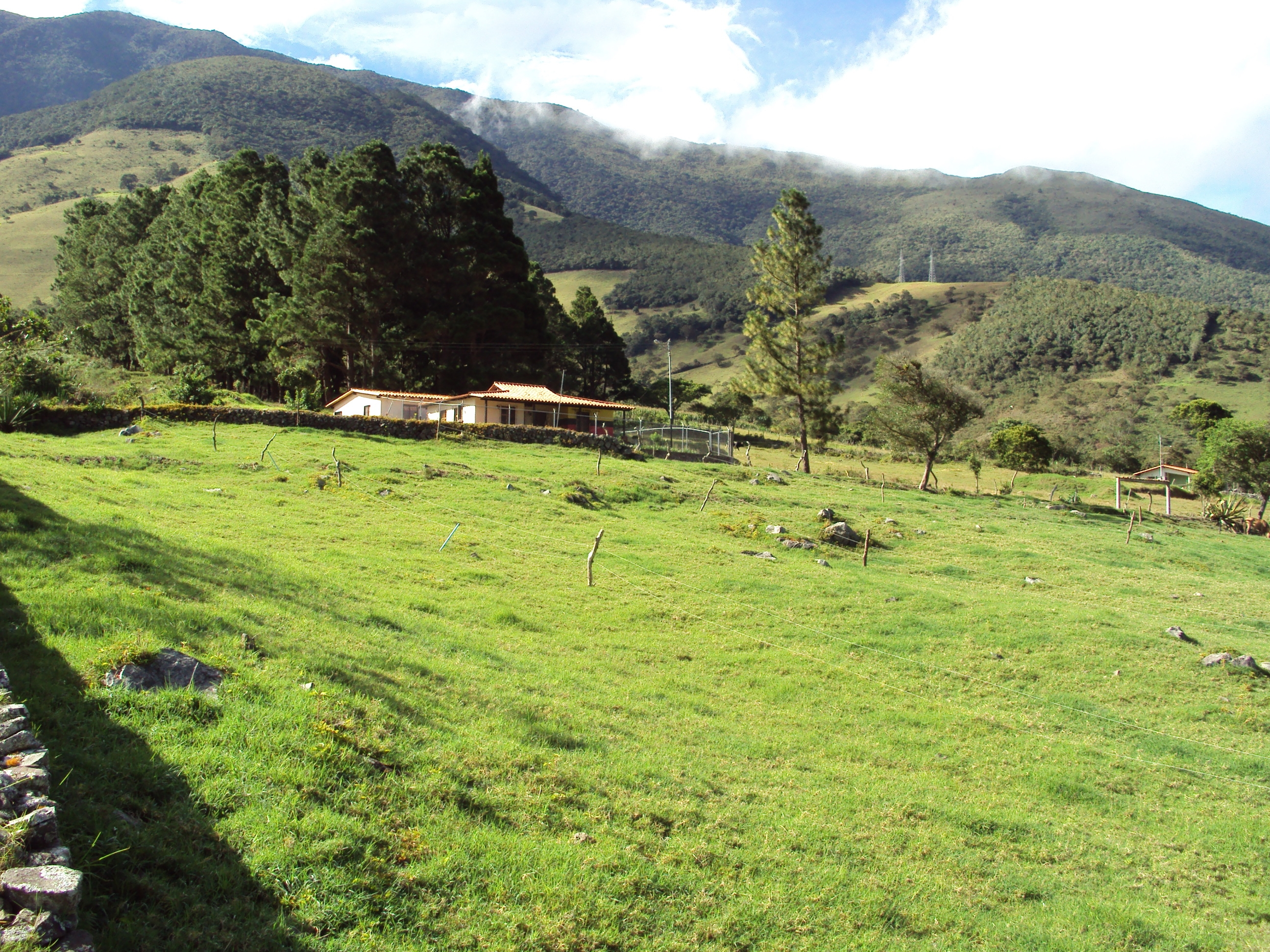
Typical rural house in the Prairies of Táchira State

Táchira State covers a total surface area of 11,100 square kilometres (4,300 sq mi) and as of the 2011 census, had a population of 1,168,908. At the end of the 19th century, Táchira State was where oil was discovered in Venezuela. Currently, its main economic revenues come from the production of coffee and pineapple. The cattle and agricultural activities play an important role in Táchira's economy. There is also a strong industrial sector which focuses on the processing of potato, sugar, milk, and cheese and the production of textiles.

Táchira State is one of the three Venezuelan Andean states (the other two are Mérida and Trujillo). This state borders Zulia State to the north, Barinas and Mérida States to the east, Apure and Barinas States to the south, and Colombia (Norte de Santander Department) to the west.

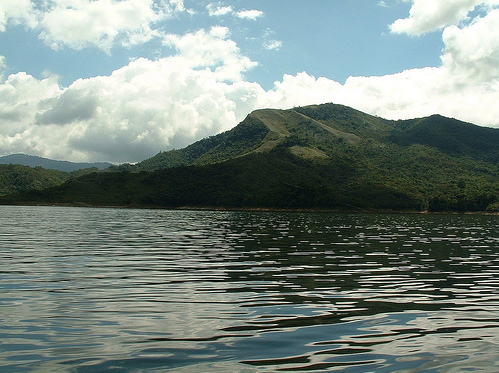
Tapo Caparo National park

== Etymology ==
Possible origins have been identified for the word Táchira, so one hypothesis states that the word is an indigenous word - based on Chibcha dialects - composed of three particles: ta, "farm" (as a root), chi, "ours, which belongs to us" and the suffix rá, "element that expresses place, moment or position (...)" with respect to the future. Thus, it would mean approximately a term like: "The land that will be our inheritance" or "The land of our inheritance".

On the other hand, it is believed that Táchira comes from a Chibcha word that comes from the term "tachure", which identifies a purple dye plant that has medicinal uses, known as tun-túa or sibidigua (Jatropa gossypifolia).

== History ==
=== Spanish colonization ===
Populated mainly by groups of Timote, Cuica and Chibcha origin and as the Machirí, Umuquena and Táriba, the territory was extensively colonized in the sixteenth century.

With the foundation of San Cristóbal in 1561 by Captain Juan Maldonado Ordoñez y Villaquirán and La Grita in 1576 by Francisco de Cáceres, the agricultural exploitation of the area began, giving rise to the creation of new settlements. Since its foundation in 1576, La Grita was the capital of the province of La Grita, so the importance of this city was primitive in the region until the arrival of European trading companies to the state, which settled mainly in the more accessible and better communicated San Cristóbal.

In 1781 Juan Jose Garcia de Hevia led the Insurrection of the Communards of Los Andes, an anti-colonial revolutionary movement that sought to liberate Venezuela from the colonialism of the Spanish Empire, under the search for tax relief.

During the Venezuelan War of Independence, Simon Bolivar invaded the country through the Táchira in his Admirable Campaign.

=== 18th and 19th centuries ===
Despite the progressive population growth of the region, its importance as Venezuela's main coffee producer for over two hundred years and the arrival of important European trading houses in the 19th century, the state remained relatively isolated from the rest of the country, with greater cultural influence received from Colombia for many years.

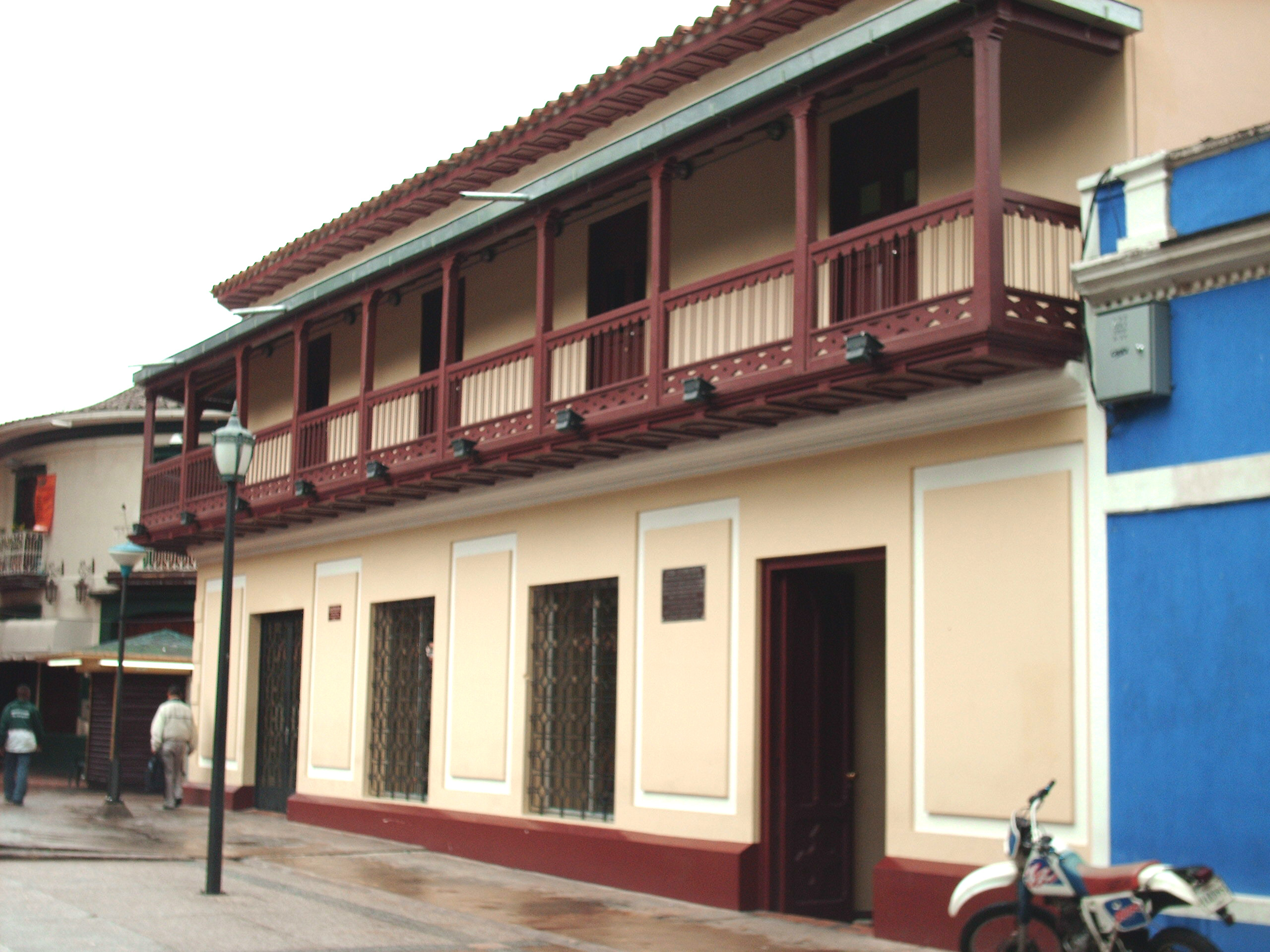
German attic style heritage house built between 1884 and 1888 in San Cristóbal, Táchira State

In a country that now depends on an economy based on oil income, the Táchira was privileged to have the first oil wells in Venezuela. At the end of the 19th century the national oil industry was born in the place now called La Petrolia.

On 11 March 1856, by decree of the Sovereign Congress of the Republic, the province of Táchira was created, formed with the cantons of San Cristóbal, San Antonio, Lobatera and La Grita. It was decided that the capital of the Province would be San Cristóbal and there the headquarters of all the organs of the Provincial Government were established, with a general population of 42,731 inhabitants. The decree of the congress with date 11 of March was sanctioned by the National Executive day 14. General Jose Tadeo Monagas governed in the Country, who named to exercise the position of the Province, to the citizen Pascual Casanova, assuming the position of Governor of the State Táchira, this civil employee was named 9 May being sworn in its position on 1 July 1856.

In 1881, during the second presidency of General Antonio Guzmán Blanco, the National Constitution was reformed, establishing that the Republic is composed of nine great States; one of them was the great State of the Andes, with the sections Trujillo, Mérida and Táchira, each section being divided into districts. The executive power of the Táchira section was exercised by General Rosendo Medina, who was replaced by General Francisco Alvarado, who was short-lived because President Guzmán Blanco imposed his delegate in the Táchira, General Marcos Rodríguez. The arrival of General Ignacio Andrade to the presidency of the Republic favored the State, since the first National Magistrate to weaken the political-administrative structures of former President Joaquín Crespo, influenced the Congress to achieve a new territorial division.

In 1895, the Gran Ferrocarril del Táchira was inaugurated, its construction began in 1893 with an extension of 105 kilometers between La Fría and Encontrados to mobilize the great crops of Tachira coffee.

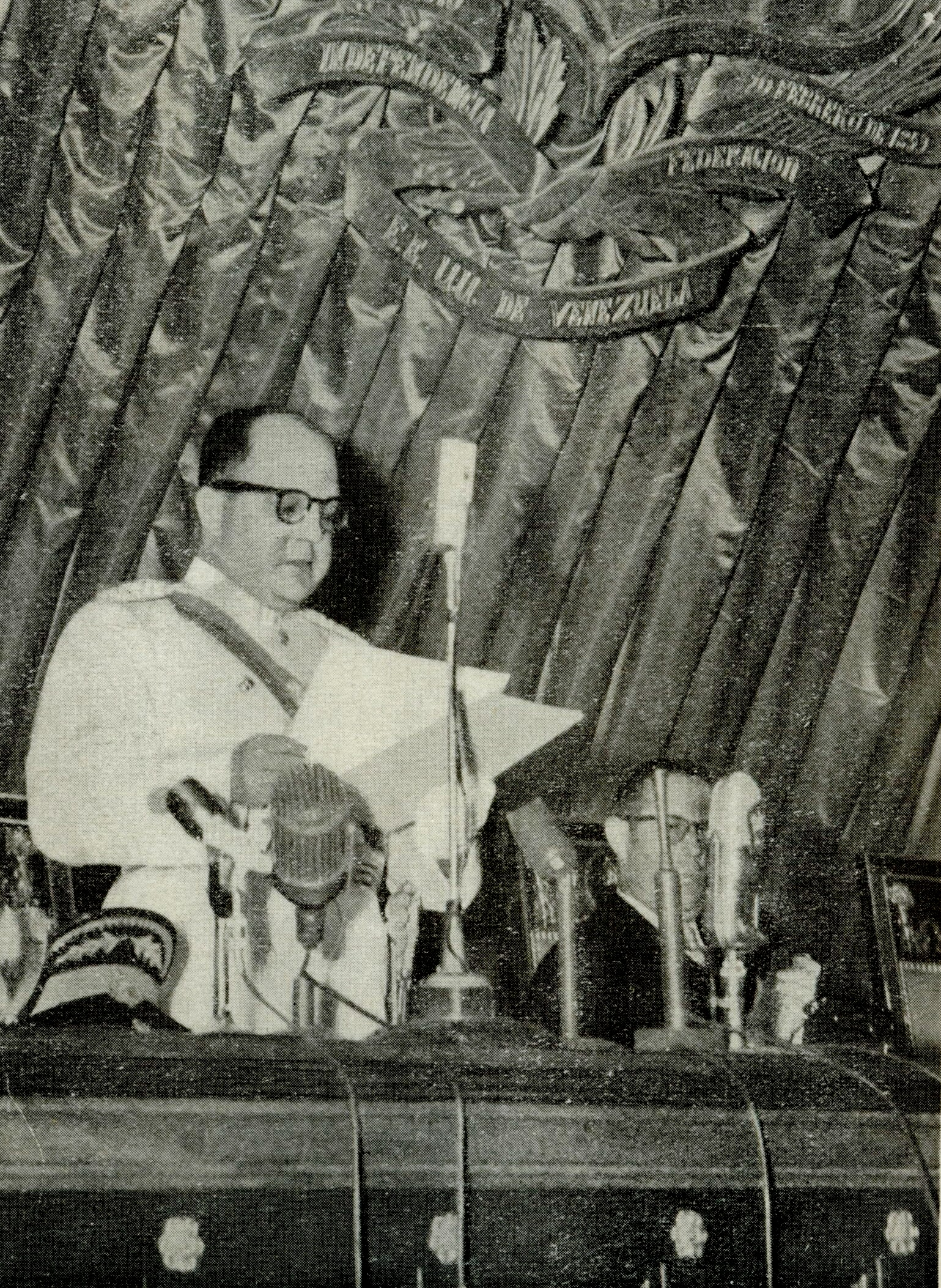
Marcos Pérez Jiménez in 1952

In 1899, Cipriano Castro began the invasion of Venezuela from the State of Táchira with an armed group that confronted the regime of Ignacio Andrade. The successive presidents of Venezuela of Tachira origin initiate a process of greater integration of the state to the country with the construction of better communication routes and the implementation of control measures on the agricultural trade of the state that was almost totally exported. Táchira State plays an important role in the early parts of Venezuelan history. This state produced more presidents than any other state during the 20th century: Cipriano Castro, Juan Vicente Gómez, Marcos Pérez Jiménez, Isaías Medina Angarita, Eleazar López Contreras, Carlos Andrés Pérez, and Ramón José Velásquez.

At the end of the 19th century, the people of Táchira State were tired of being left out of the main country's decisions. Consequently, a group of men decided to start a revolution called the "Revolución Restauradora" (The Restorative Revolution). The idea was to take power and enhance the importance of the Andean Region in the country. It was led by Cipriano Castro and was successful.

Until the start of the 20th century, it was highly difficult traveling between Táchira State and others and even within the state itself. This condition led to cultural differences between the people of Táchira and those from the rest of Venezuela. The former were more influenced by Colombian culture, a more accessible region through Norte de Santander province.

=== Territorial History ===
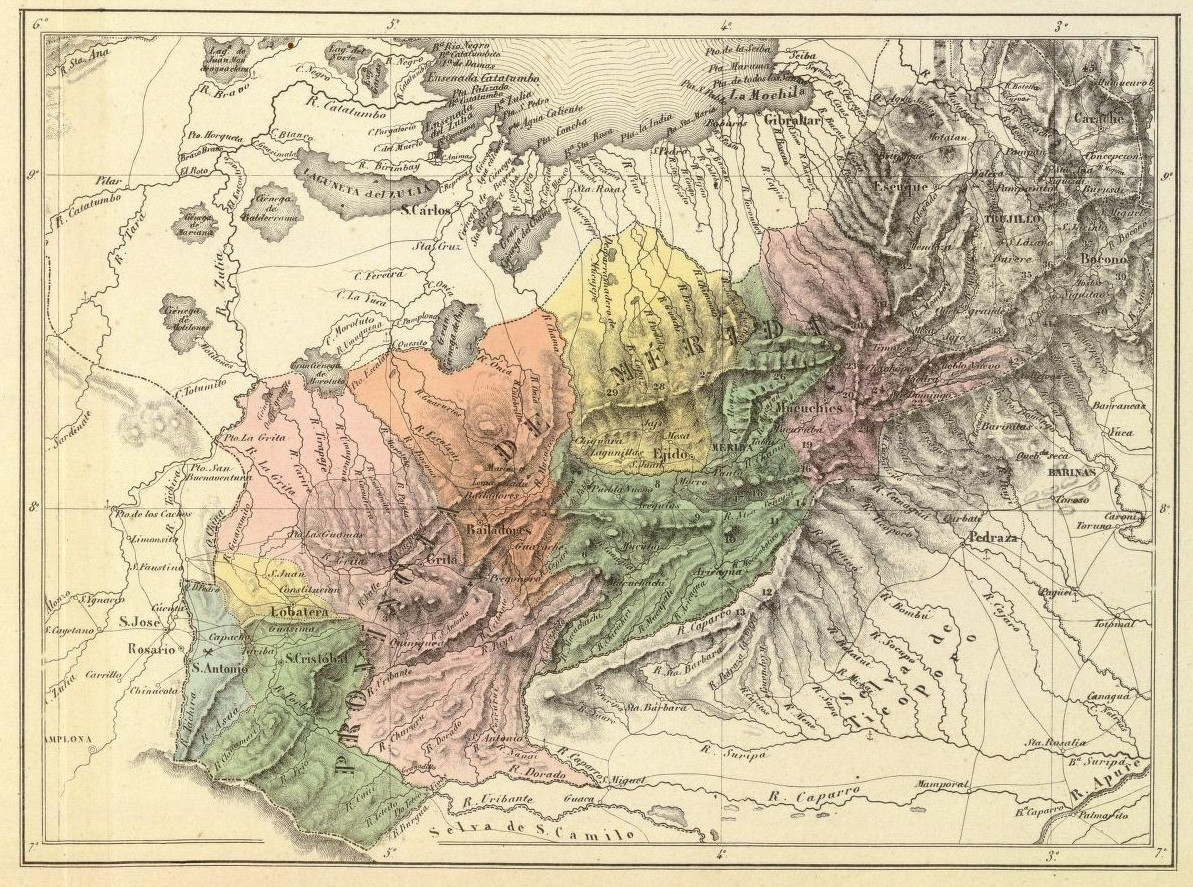
Táchira as part of the province of Mérida in 1840

- In 1856 it was part of the province of Táchira within the territories of La Grita, Lobatera, San Antonio and San Cristóbal.
- In 1863 it acquired the category of State, a fact that was ratified in 1864 when it became part, as an independent state, of the United States of Venezuela.
- Between 1867 and 1868 it was part of the State of Zulia.
- In 1881, when the country was divided into 9 states, it became part, together with Guzmán (Mérida) and Trujillo, of the Great State of Los Andes.
- In 1899, the State of Los Andes was dissolved and Táchira recovered its status as an independent State, which it maintains to this day.
- It has remained a state since 1899, although like other states in Venezuela it did not achieve full autonomy until the early 1990s.

== Geography ==
Táchira State is located in the Andes. Its highest point is La Montaña el Pulpito, which about 3995 meters above the sea level. Táchira's population is mainly located in San Cristóbal, the most important and prosperous city of this state. Tariba, Rubio, Colon, and La Grita are also other important urban centers in this state.

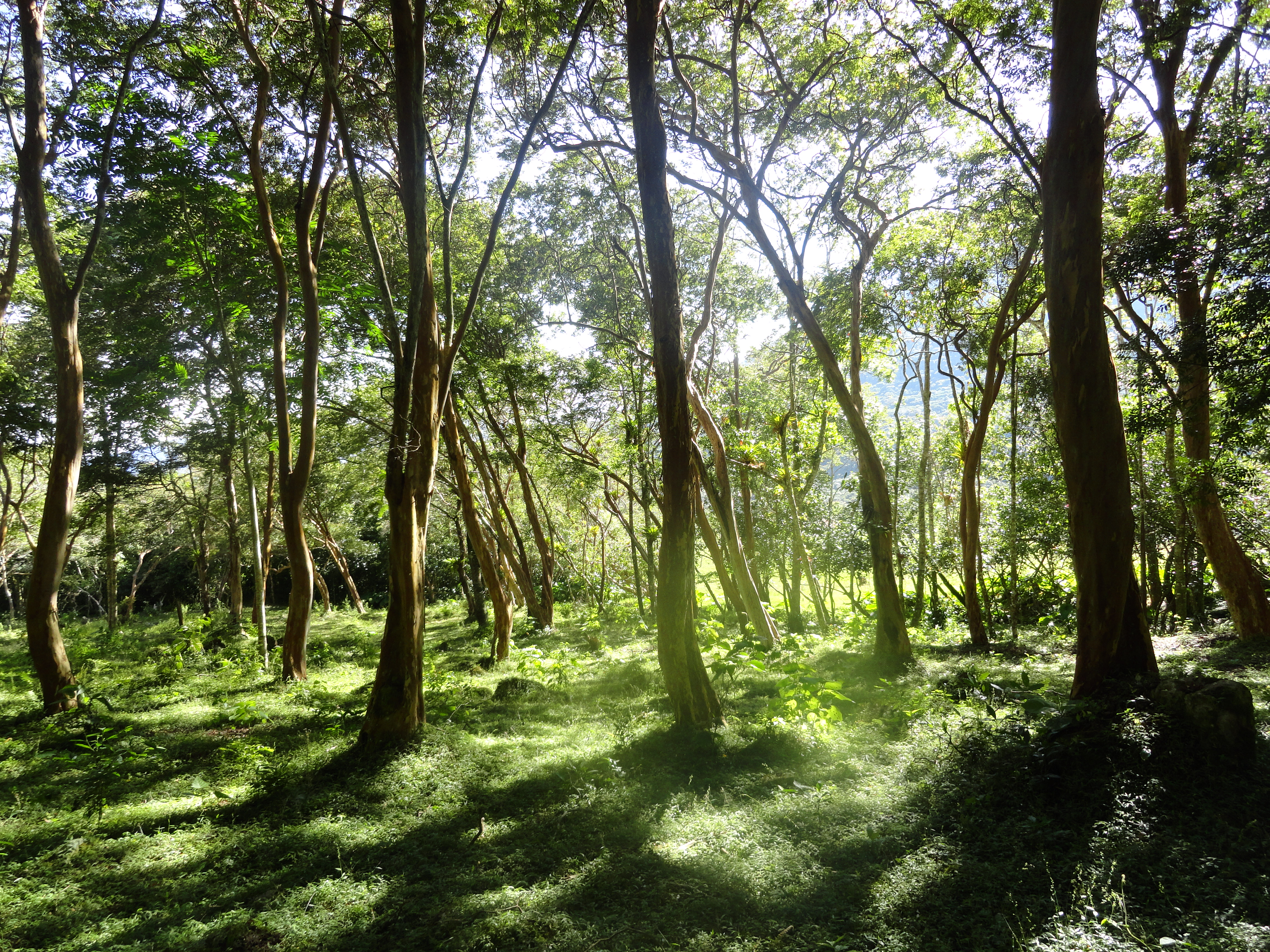
Forest in the Borotá Mountains, Municipality Lobatera

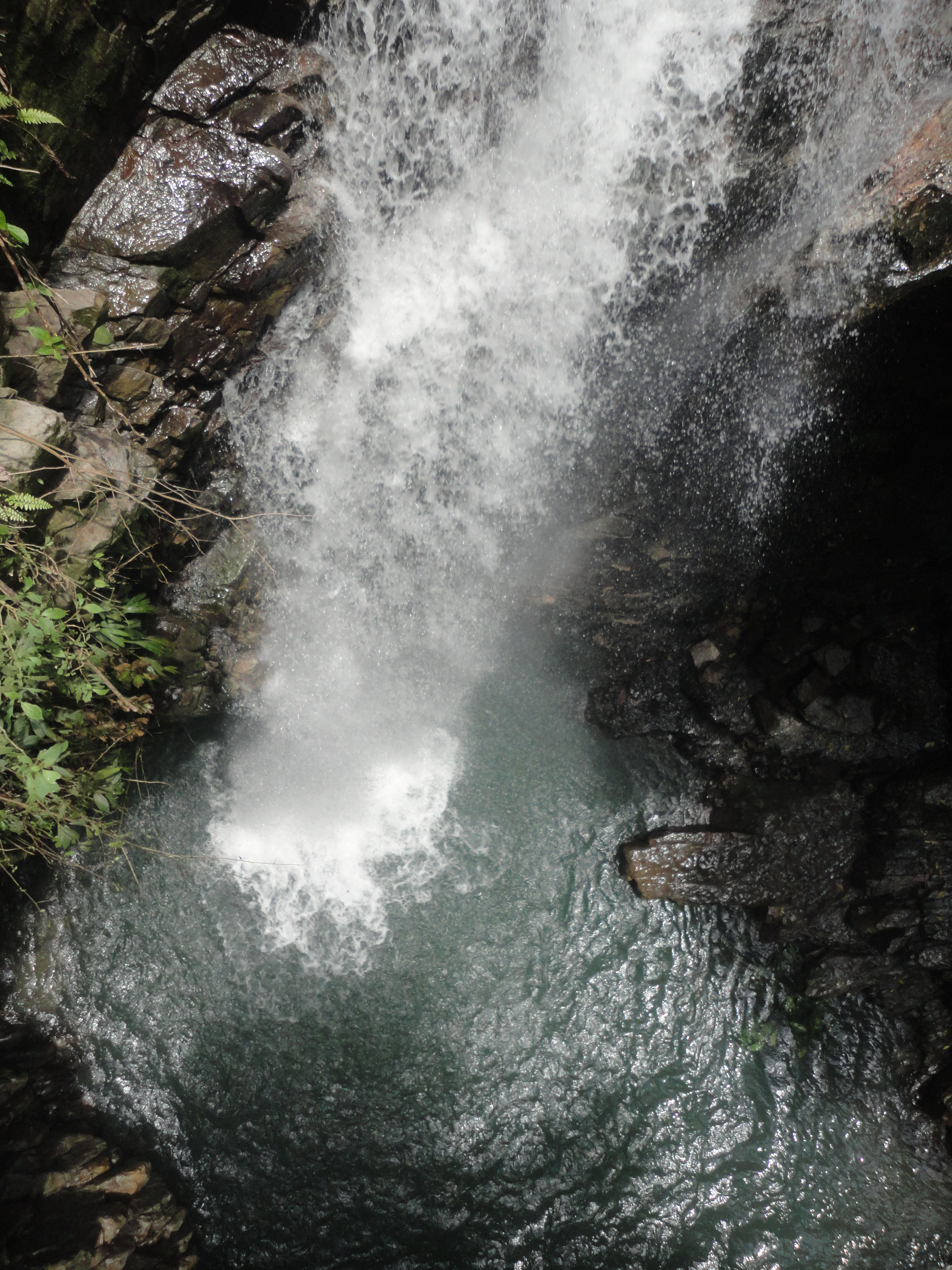
Venteadero waterfall.

It has international borders with Colombia in the west and south with Norte de Santander Department. Zulia and Mérida States lie to the north, and Barinas and Apure States lie to the east.

The main peaks are:

- The Pulpit: 3,912 m
- Moor Battalion: 3,507 m
- The Tama: 3,450 m
- Moor La Negra: 3,450 m
- Moor The Zumbador: 2,850 m

Crossed by the extension of the Andes mountain range from south to northwest, it divides the state into three different regions with a particular climate:

- Mountain circuit; in this region are the main urban settlements in the state, the climate is temperate at high altitude8 in most of the region and high moorland at elevations above 3000 meters above sea level, with slight variations throughout the year, has a clear rainy season from May to October. The orography is uneven and influenced by the course of numerous rivers and streams that form valleys at the base of the mountains, as an example the capital city is settled on the valley of the river Torbes, this area represents most of the surface of the state. The main cities located in this area are San Cristóbal, Táriba, Michelena, Rubio and La Grita.
- Pan-American circuit: this zone is located mainly in the north of the state, it shares the climatic characteristics of the southern region of the lake (of Maracaibo), with a tropical jungle climate, high rainfall and high temperatures. This region is one of the main centers of livestock production in Venezuela. It is on the border of the states of Zulia and Mérida. The main populations of this region are: La Fría, La Tendida and Coloncito.
- Llanos region: a small part of the Venezuelan plains are briefly located southeast of the state of Táchira, on the border with the states of Apure and Barinas, the climate is tropical savannah, with less humidity than in the Pan-American zone, it is also a region of high livestock production. Its main populations are: La Pedrera, El Piñal and Abejales.

=== Relief ===
Its territory has an area of 11,100 km^{2}, where the Andean physiographic character predominates, with heights above 2,000 m. The mountainous relief is the southern continuation of the Mérida mountain range, which penetrates from the north in a southwesterly direction, exceeding 4,000 m in the La Negra moor.

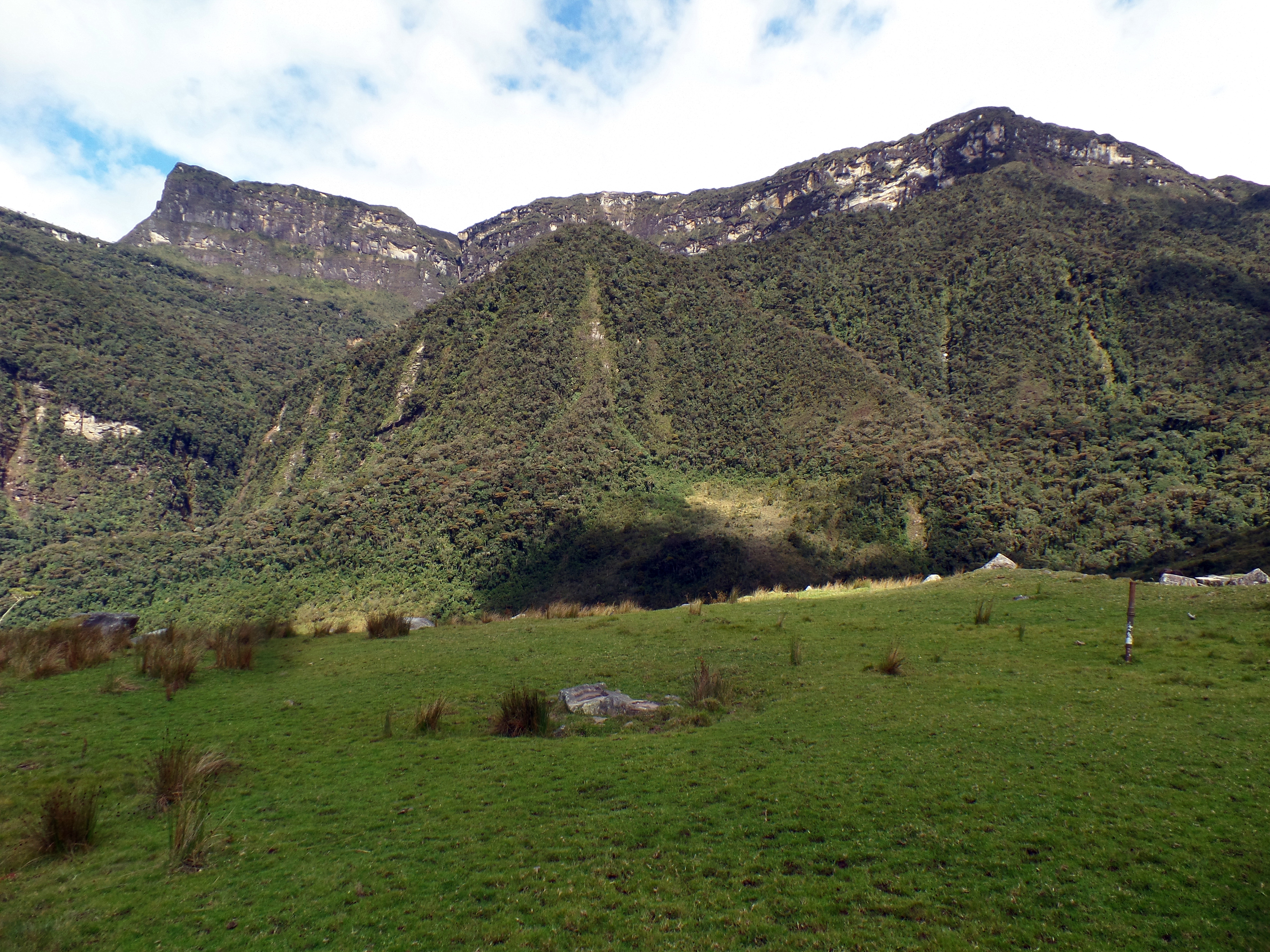
Mountain formations, El Tamá National Park, Táchira State

In the extreme southwest, the Táchira depression was formed, which includes the tectonic trench through which the river of the same name runs and the entire relatively low area located between this trench and the valleys of the Lobaterita, the Torbes Medio and the Quinimarí Medio. The depression of the Torbes River separates the main range of the Mérida Range from the Tamá Range. During the Tertiary period, the uplifts of failed blocks formed deep valleys like those of the Uribante and Torbes rivers, with very steep slopes. In addition, there are relatively open basins with gently sloping terrain (San Cristóbal-Táriba-Rubio). The northern slopes come into contact with the lowlands located south of Lake Maracaibo, with large marshy areas, while the southeastern sector, from the eastern slope of the Uribante branch, is a transition zone between the piedmont (the lowlands of the mountainous formation) and the western high plains.

=== Climate ===
The climate presents great variations, mainly due to the modifications by the height, in populations of the route to the plain, in the piedmont (El Piñal, San Joaquin de Navay among others), can reach temperatures of 30 °C like in the Pan-American route (La Fría, Coloncito). In the capital, San Cristóbal, the average daytime temperature is 24 °C and the nighttime temperature is 18 °C. However, in cities like Pregonero, El Cobre, La Grita and others located at higher altitudes, the temperature is considerably lower (up to 10 °C).

=== Vegetation ===
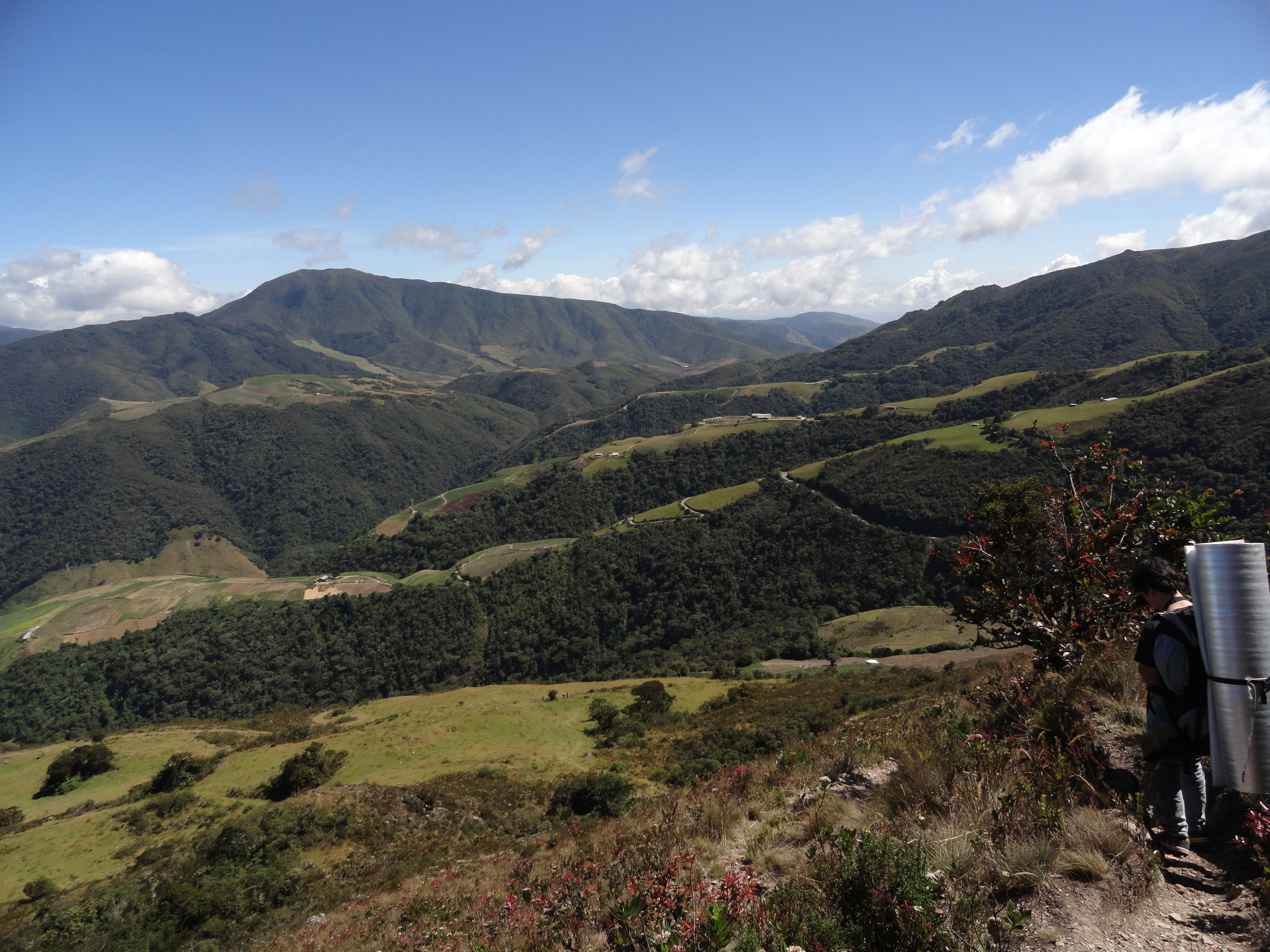
Juan Pablo Peñaloza National Park

The mountain vegetation includes specimens such as the Lasso pine and eucalyptus. The apamates and the creole cedar are abundant. Mangos, guamas, pomarrosas, guavas and other fruit trees are common in most of the state.

=== Hydrography ===
The hydrography is varied, there are several rivers of considerable course; the Torbes river, the Caparo river, the Uribante and the Doradas rivers among others, there are also some lakes and reservoirs, like the Uribante reservoir, the Caparo reservoir, the Garcia lagoon, the Rosal lagoon, the Ríobobo lagoon, among others.

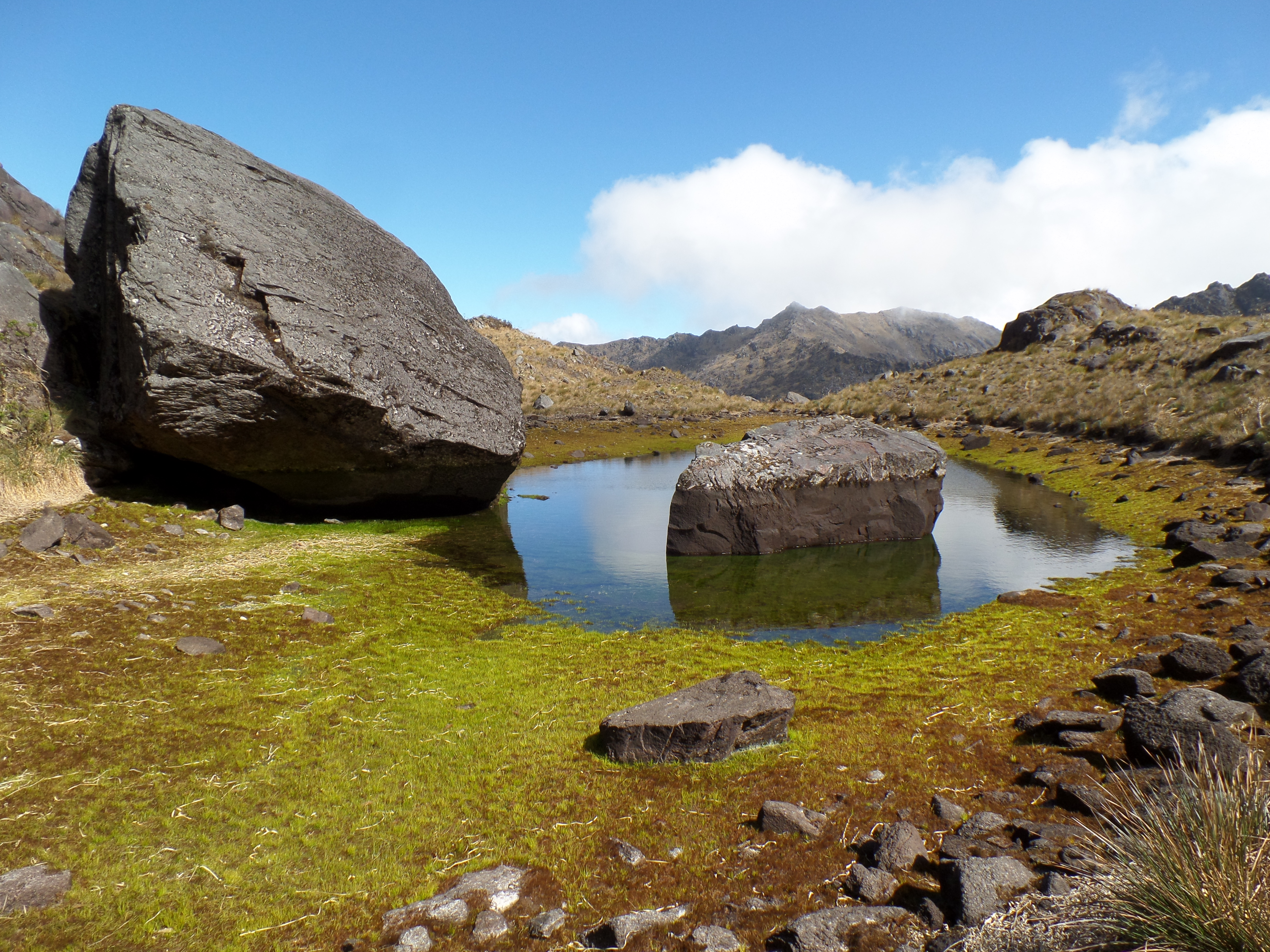
General Juan Pablo Peñaloza National Park, Táchira, State

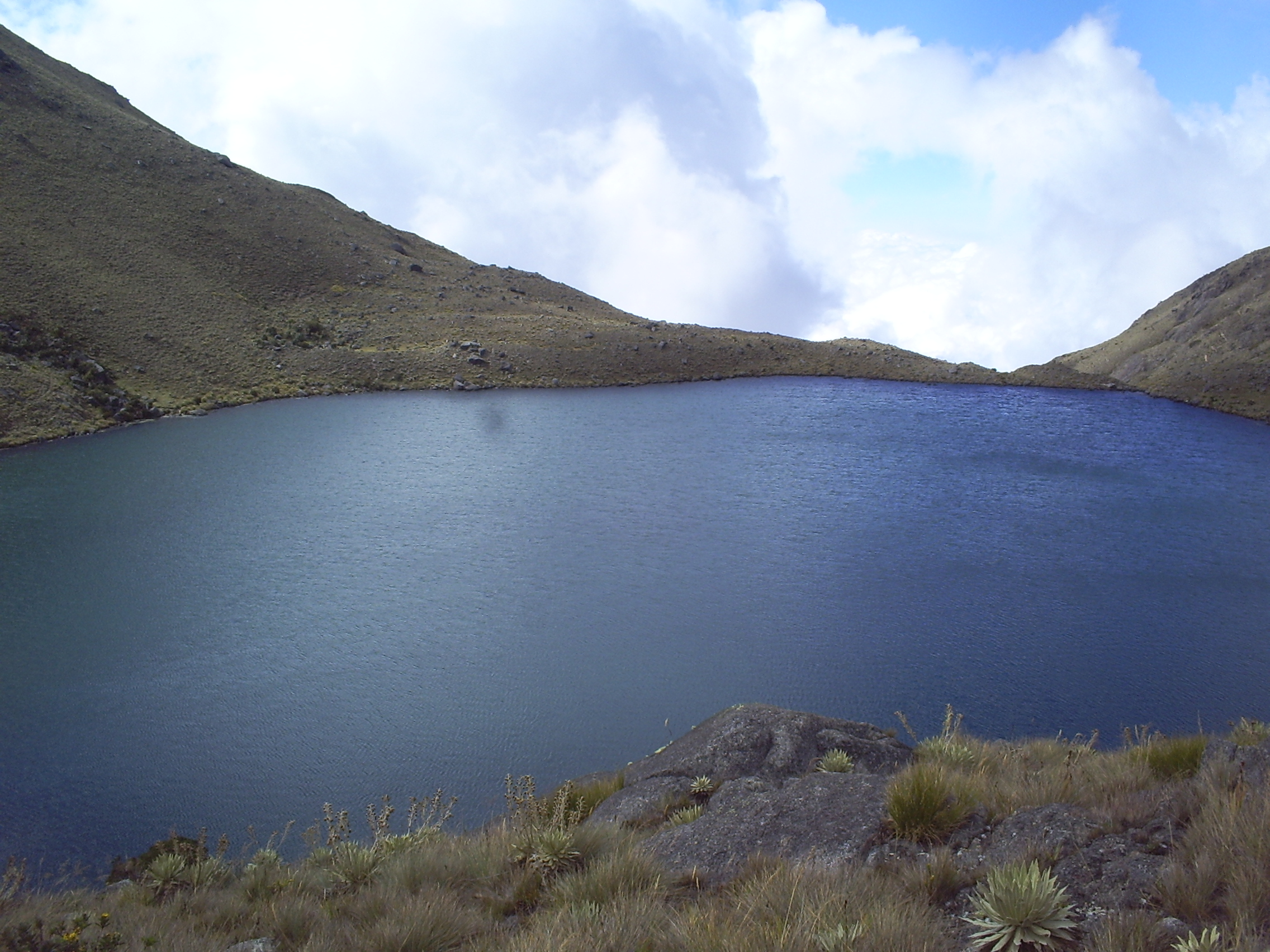
Laguna Grande

=== Extreme geographical landmarks ===
Far North, confluence of the Rio Grande with the Rio Escalante (Pan-American); Far South, confluence of the Rio Burgua with the Los Pensamientos stream (Fernández Feo); Far East, confluence of the Rio Doradas (Cauce Viejo) with the Rio Caparo (Libertador); Far West, eastern bank of the Rio Táchira in front of the Cerrito, village Sabana Larga (Pedro María Ureña). Distance between the extreme points of the State: north-south, 147.88 km; east-west: 129.03 km.

=== Geology ===
The Tachira Andes were formed during the Eocene period (between 56 million and 40 million years ago approximately), when the Nazca tectonic plate and the Caribbean plate began to slowly slide under the South American plate, raising older formations and bending the sedimentary and igneous rocks that form today's mountains (several of the highest peaks and moors in the State of Tachira are from the Phanerozoic eon, from the Precambrian period, about 539 million years ago).

The tectonic forces generated by this collision created: the shapes of the highest mountains and peaks (El Pico El Púlpito, 3,912 m, in the northeastern end, and Cerro El Cobre, 3,612 m, in the southwestern end. Both are known as 'The Guardian Pillars of the Tachira'); a tectonic depression (known as the Tachira Depression, from the Pliocene); intramountain areas surrounded by higher ground, known as valleys (from the Pleistocene era). These are where the largest towns and cities are located); and the plains or lowlands of the north - lakes or the lake - and the south of the state - river plains - (areas of piedmont formed between the Miocene and Pliocene).

- Highest point: El Púlpito Peak (3,912 m, Páramo de Batallón Mountain Range, Jáuregui and Uribante Municipalities).

== Government and politics ==
The State is autonomous and equal in political terms to the rest of Venezuela, its administration and public powers are organized through the Constitution of the State of Táchira, approved by the Legislative Council and published in the extraordinary official gazette of the State of Táchira, number 778, on 9 February 2001.

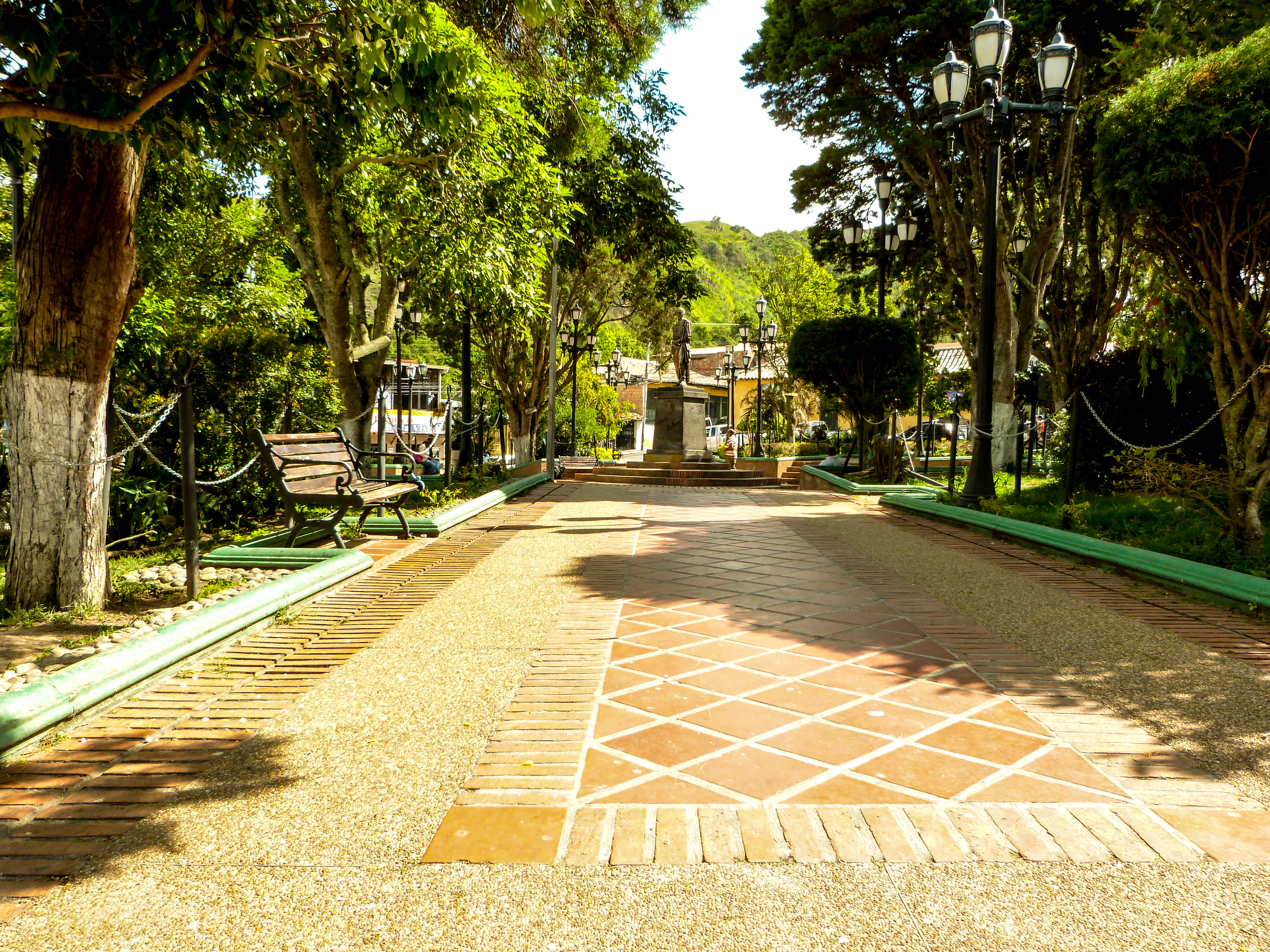
Bolivar Square, Libertador Municipality

=== Executive power ===
It is composed of the Governor of Táchira and a group of state secretaries. The Governor is elected by the people by direct and secret vote for a period of four years and has the possibility of re-election for equal periods and a recall referendum in the middle of his term, being in charge of the state administration.

The State chooses its own Legislative Council as well as a Governor who is the Chief Executive of the State and is elected every 4 years; as of 1989, before that year he was elected by the President in office, his last Governor appointed by President Carlos Andrés Peréz, was Governor Jorge Enrique Romero, since 1989 he is chosen under direct elections, the current Governor Laidy Gómez is elected for the period (2017 - 2021) with the support of her party AD and other political organizations related to the Venezuelan opposition.

=== Legislative Council ===
The State Legislature is the responsibility of the unicameral Legislative Council of the State of Táchira, elected by the people by direct and secret vote every (4) four years, and they may be re-elected for new consecutive periods, under a system of proportional representation of the population of the State and its municipalities. The State has 13 legislators.

Táchira State Police Logo

=== State Police ===
The state of Táchira, in accordance with Article 164 of the Venezuelan Constitution and Article 45 of the Constitution of the state of Táchira of 2014, has its own police force, called Politáchira, created in July 1960. Its functions are regulated by state and national laws, namely the Law of the Autonomous Institute of Police of the State of Táchira, the former; and the Organic Law of the Police Service, the latter. It reports to the Secretariat of State Security and is primarily responsible for regional security.

Like the other 23 federal entities of Venezuela, the State maintains control over own police force, which is supported and complemented by the National Police and the Venezuelan National Guard.

== Municipalities and municipal seats ==
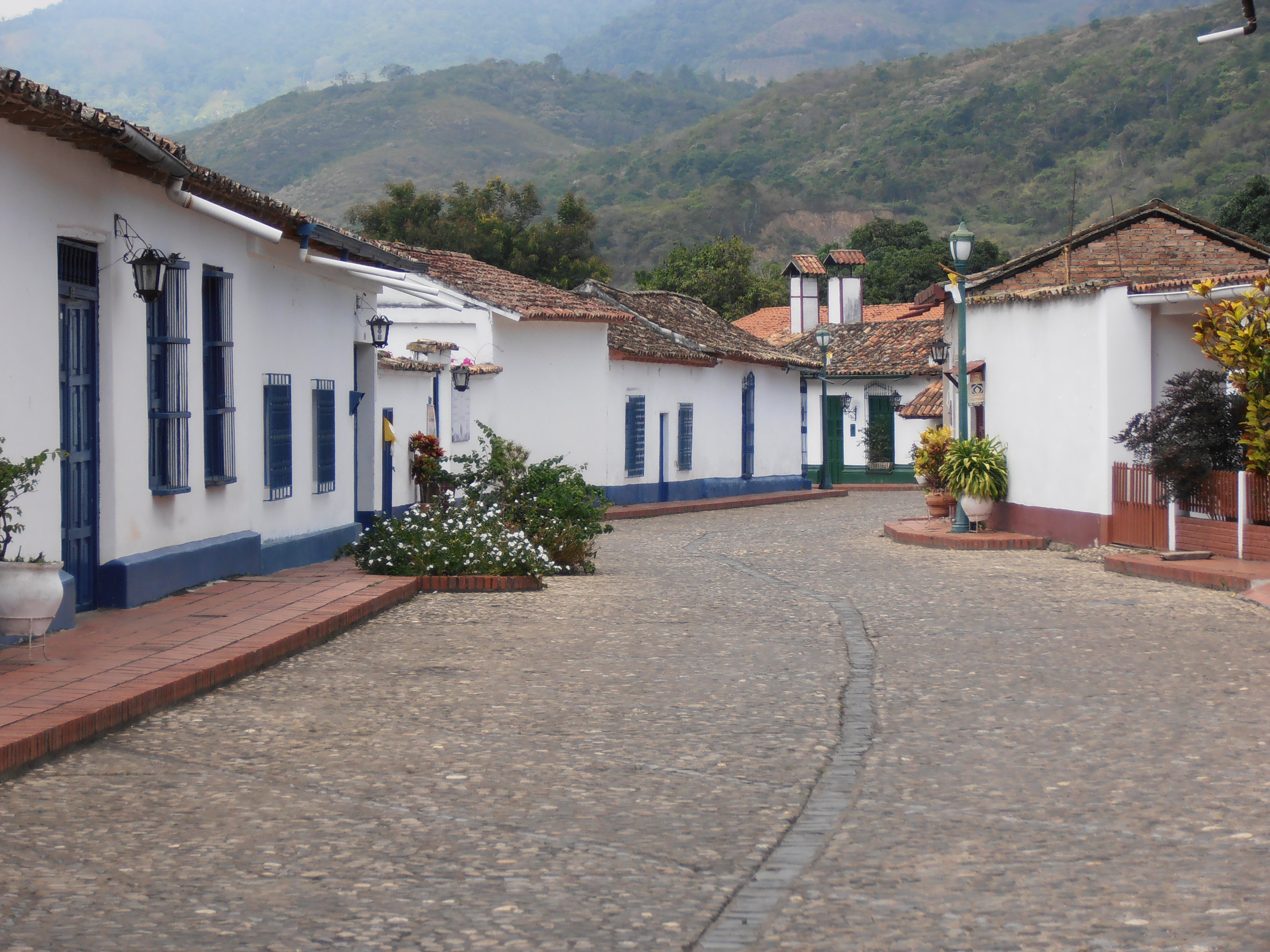
San Pedro del Río, Táchira State

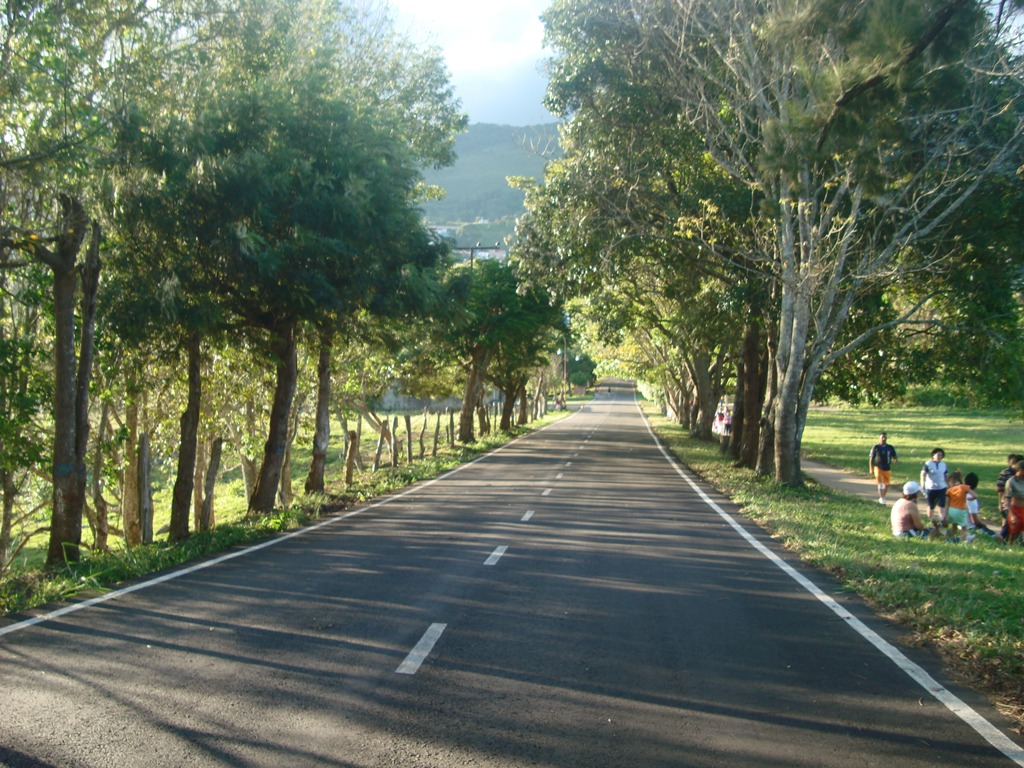
Palmira, Tachira

Municipalities of Táchira

1. Andrés Bello (Cordero)
2. Antonio Rómulo Costa (Las Mesas)
3. Ayacucho (Colón)
4. Bolívar (San Antonio del Táchira)
5. Cárdenas (Táriba)
6. Córdoba (Santa Ana del Táchira)
7. Fernández Feo (San Rafael del Piñal)
8. Francisco de Miranda (San José de Bolívar)
9. García de Hevia (La Fría)
10. Guásimos (Palmira)
11. Independencia (Capacho Nuevo)
12. Jáuregui (La Grita)
13. José María Vargas (El Cobre)
14. Junín (Rubio)
15. Libertad (Capacho Viejo)
16. Libertador (Abejales)
17. Lobatera (Lobatera)
18. Michelena (Michelena)
19. Panamericano (Coloncito)
20. Pedro María Ureña (Ureña)
21. Rafael Urdaneta (Delicias)
22. Samuel Darío Maldonado (La Tendida)
23. San Cristóbal (San Cristóbal)
24. San Judas Tadeo (Umuquena)
25. Seboruco (Seboruco)
26. Simón Rodríguez (San Simon)
27. Sucre (Queniquea)
28. Torbes (San Josecito)
29. Uribante (Pregonero)

=== State Capital ===
The city of San Cristóbal is the capital of the state. It is an important economic pole for the country since it is located in the Colombian-Venezuelan border axis and, therefore, it is a commercial city where small and medium entrepreneurs develop important commercial transactions. It has a metropolitan population that exceeds 400,000 inhabitants. Its topography extends under a succession of river terraces and has an average temperature of 23 °C. It is at an altitude of 825 meters above sea level, which gives it a pleasant climate. San Cristóbal was founded on 31 March 1561, by the captain and advanced Juan Maldonado y Ordóñez, which makes it one of the oldest cities in Venezuela.

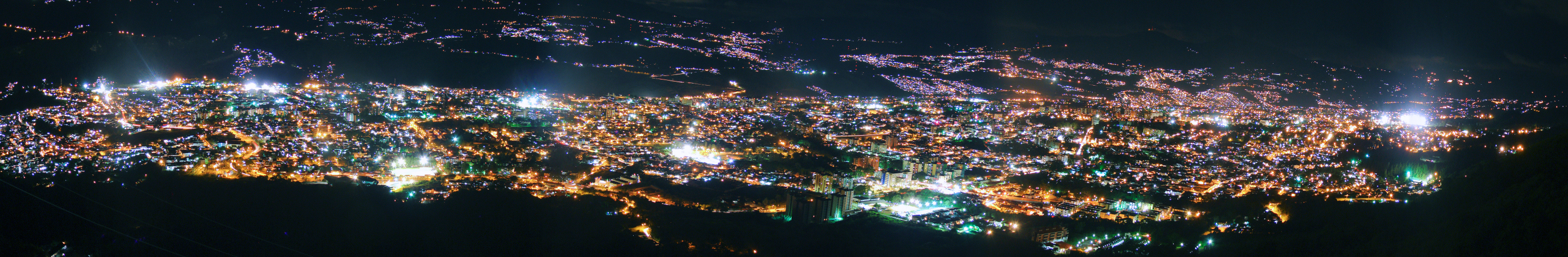
San Cristóbal, the state capital

Nowadays, the city of San Cristóbal is recognized by its wide academic and cultural activity. Its universities are recognized: Universidad de los Andes (Táchira nucleus), Universidad Nacional Experimental del Táchira (UNET) and Universidad Católica del Táchira (UCAT), among others, as well as for its San Sebastián International Fair.

=== Main towns ===
The San Cristóbal metropolitan area, made up of the municipalities of Andrés Bello, Cárdenas, Córdoba, Guásimos, Libertad, Independencia, Tórbes and San Cristóbal, will have around 263,7659 inhabitants in 2011, which represents the largest population concentration in the state.

According to the data projected by the INE for the year 2013 the main population centers are

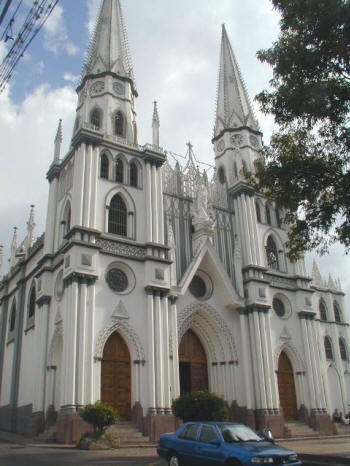
Nuestra Señora de los Ángeles Church, in La Grita

- San Cristóbal: 263 765 inhabitants.
- Táriba: 97 356 inhabitants.
- Rubio: 95 041 inhabitants.
- San Antonio del Táchira: 69 661 inhabitants.
- San Juan de Colón: 69 387 inhabitants
- La Fría: 60 392 inhabitants.
- La Grita: 54 366 inhabitants.
- Ureña: 51 900 inhabitants.
- Palmira: 50 899 inhabitants.
- El Piñal: 50 417 inhabitants.

== Demographics ==
Historical population
Year	Pop.	±% p.a.
1873	68,619	—
1881	83,521	+2.49%
1891	101,709	+1.99%
1920	147,076	+1.28%
1926	172,900	+2.73%
1936	216,387	+2.27%
1941	245,722	+2.58%
1950	304,181	+2.40%
1961	399,163	+2.50%
1971	511,346	+2.51%
1981	660,234	+2.59%
1990	807,712	+2.27%
2001	992,669	+1.89%
2011	1,168,908	+1.65%
Source: "XIV CENSO NACIONAL DE POBLACIÓN Y VIVIENDA - Resultados por Entidad Federal y Municipio del Estado Táchira" (PDF). Instituto Nacional de Estadística.

=== Race and ethnicity ===
According to the 2011 Census, the racial composition of the population was:

Racial composition	Population	%
White	743,013	58.8
Mestizo	—N/a	38.6
Black	22,745	1.8
Other race	—N/a	0.8

=== Ethnography ===
The majority of the state's population is white, European contribution is notably higher than that of Indigenous and African Venezuelans. It is one of the Venezuelan states with the highest proportion of whites, mostly of Southern European descent.

== Economy ==
The Táchira has an active economy because it is a border state where there is a great flow of capital, goods and services that exist between Venezuela and Colombia passing through this region.

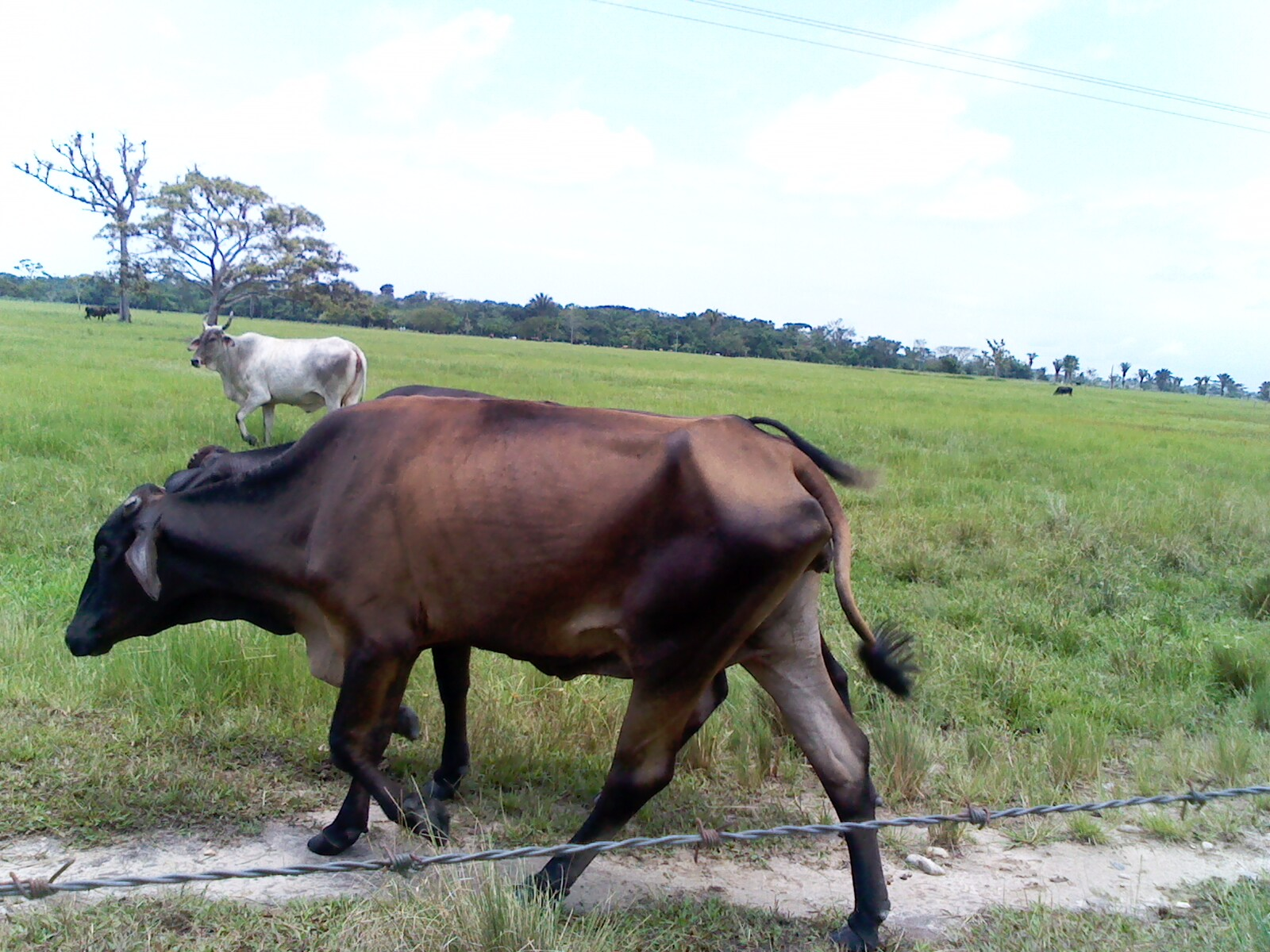
Cattle in Táchira State

- Primary sector
  - Fishing: blanco pobre, cachama, cajaro, coporo, palometa, torumo, tumare (in rivers), striped catfish.
  - Agricultural products: garlic, cambur, sugar cane, coffee, caraota, onion, potato, banana and tomato.
  - Livestock production: mainly cattle.
  - Forest resources: bucare, guamo, wax, laurel, butter, laso pine, quindu, among others.
- Industrial activity
  - Industrial zone of Ureña, the largest and most diverse in the state (bodywork, plastics, textiles, furniture, construction, among others).
  - Food industry: dairy products, confectionery, preserves, coffee, typical bakeries.
  - Automotive: bus manufacturing.
  - Handicrafts: hammocks, textiles, pottery, saddlery, woodwork, tannery.
  - Mining industries: extraction of coal, asphalt, gypsum.
  - Manufacturing: textiles, footwear, clothing, leather factories; industries mainly located in the border area; currently they have been greatly reduced by the exchange rate differential and the closure of the border.
  - Energy: Uribante-Caparo hydroelectric complex.

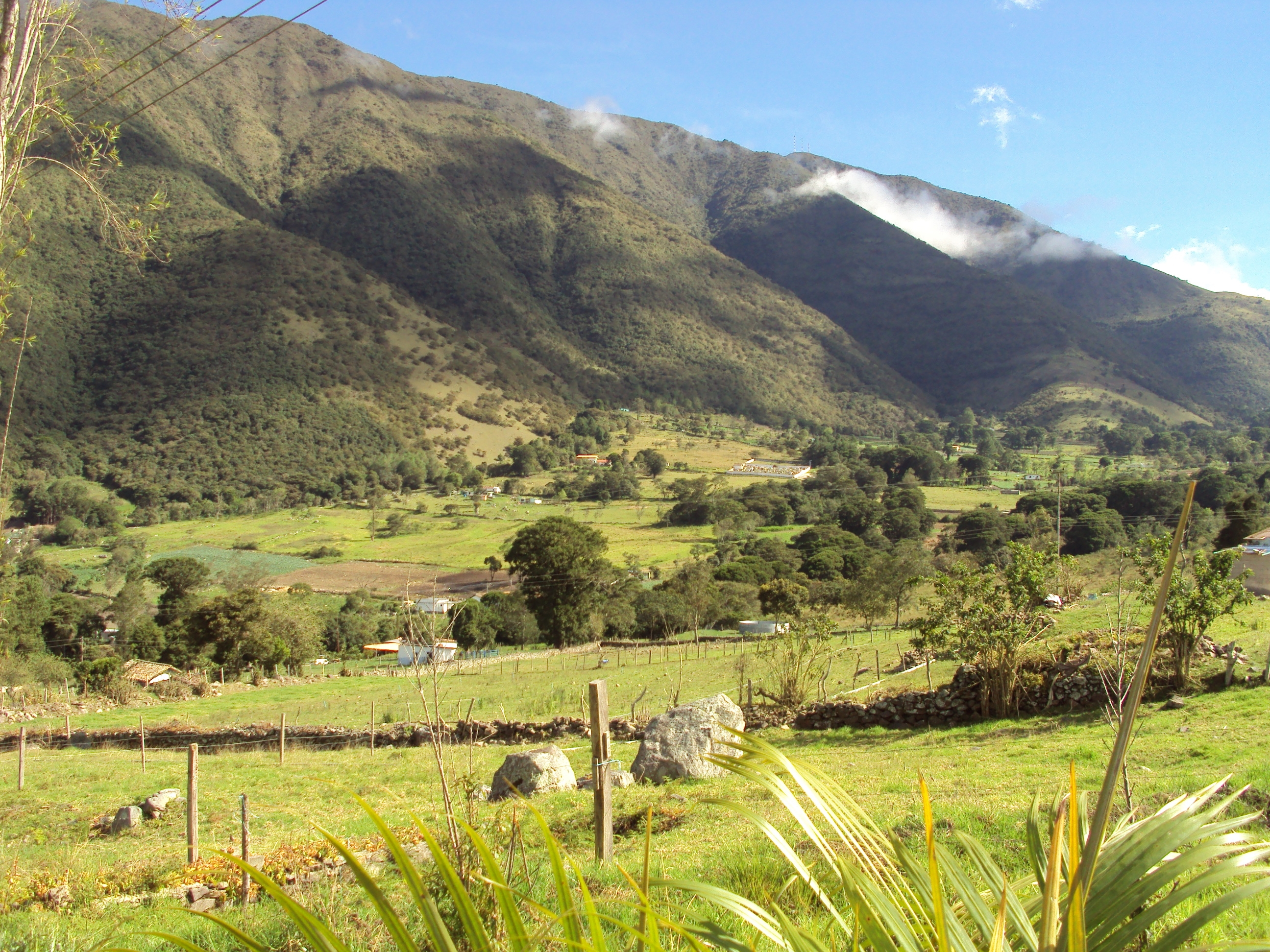
Small farms in the mountains

- Tertiary or service sector
  - Banking: Apart from the large national banks, the main bank in the region is represented by Banco Sofitasa, a solid financial institution that serves as an economic engine for the financing of many projects in the region. Táchira is also a business location for many other banking offices with a national presence.

== Education ==
The State of Táchira is the center of important universities.

=== Public Universities ===
- National Experimental University of Táchira - UNET
- University of Los Andes, Táchira Nucleus - ULA
- Universidad Pedagógica Experimental Libertador, Instituto Pedagógico Rural "Gervasio Rubio" - UPEL
- University Institute of Agro-Industrial Technology - IUTAI
- Universidad Nacional Experimental Politécnica de la Fuerza Armada, Núcleo Táchira - UNEFA
- National Open University, Centro Local San Cristóbal - UNA
- Simón Rodríguez National Experimental University, La Grita Center
- Degree in Nursing, Romulo Gallegos University
- Bolivarian University of Venezuela UBV Núcleo Táchira
- Manuela Saenz Polytechnic University of the Territory UPT
- National Experimental Security University UNES

=== Private Universities ===
- Bicentennial University of Aragua, San Táchira Agreement
- Cecilio Acosta Catholic University, San Cristobal Extension - UNICA
- Catholic University of Táchira - UCAT
- Santiago Mariño Polytechnic University Institute, San Cristóbal Extension - IUPSM
- Monsignor de Talavera University College, San Cristóbal Campus - CUMT
- Antonio José de Sucre University Institute of Technology, San Cristóbal Extension - IUTAJS
- Border University Institute - IUFRONT
- University Institute of Industrial Technology - IUTI
- Gran Colombia University Institute - IUGC
- Jesús Enrique Lossada University Institute, San Cristóbal Extension - IUJEL
- Juan Pablo Pérez Alfonzo University Institute of Technology, San Cristóbal Extension - IUTEPAL
- International Center for Continuing Education - Caribbean International University Curaçao - CIDEC-

== Religion ==
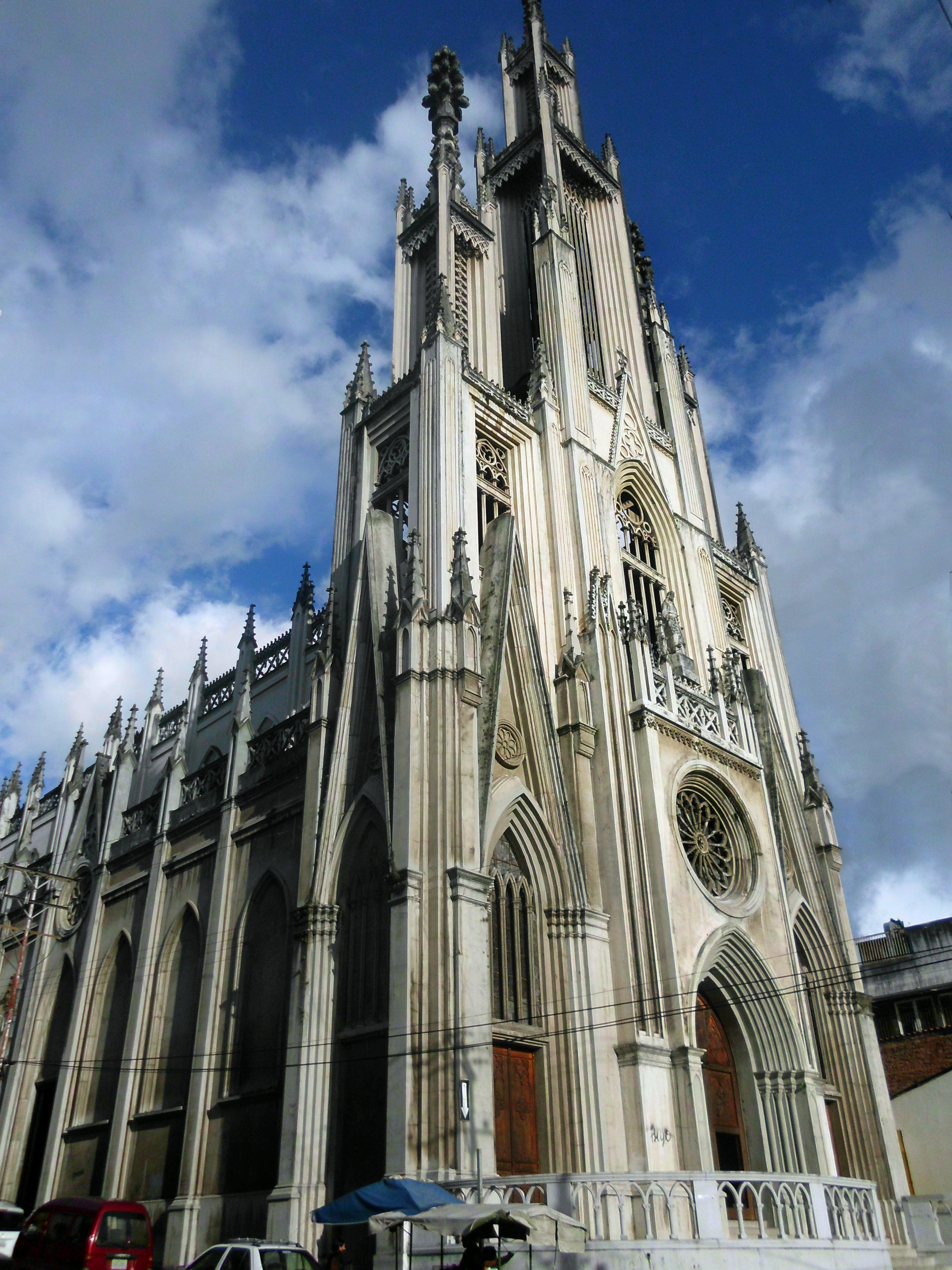
San José Catholic Church, San Cristóbal

The state is predominantly Christian with the most widespread denomination being the Catholic faith. The first mass celebrated in the territory of the present Táchira State, was on July 25, 1558, in the Santiago Valley, on the solemnity of Santiago Apostle, and was carried out by the Dominican Friar Alonso de Andrada, chaplain of the expedition of Captain Juan Rodríguez Suárez. The first uninterrupted religious services, began in April 1561 in the Fort of Tapias, after the foundation of the city of San Cristobal. Thus, the first and oldest parish in the State of Táchira is the current parish of El Sagrario/San Cristóbal Cathedral, whose oldest sacramental books have been preserved since 1601. The Diocese of San Cristóbal de Venezuela/Dioecesis Sancti Christophori in Venetiola (erected by the Apostolic Constitution Ad munus of 1922), with its episcopal see in the city of San Cristóbal, belongs to the ecclesiastical province of the Archbishopric of Mérida.

== Tourism ==
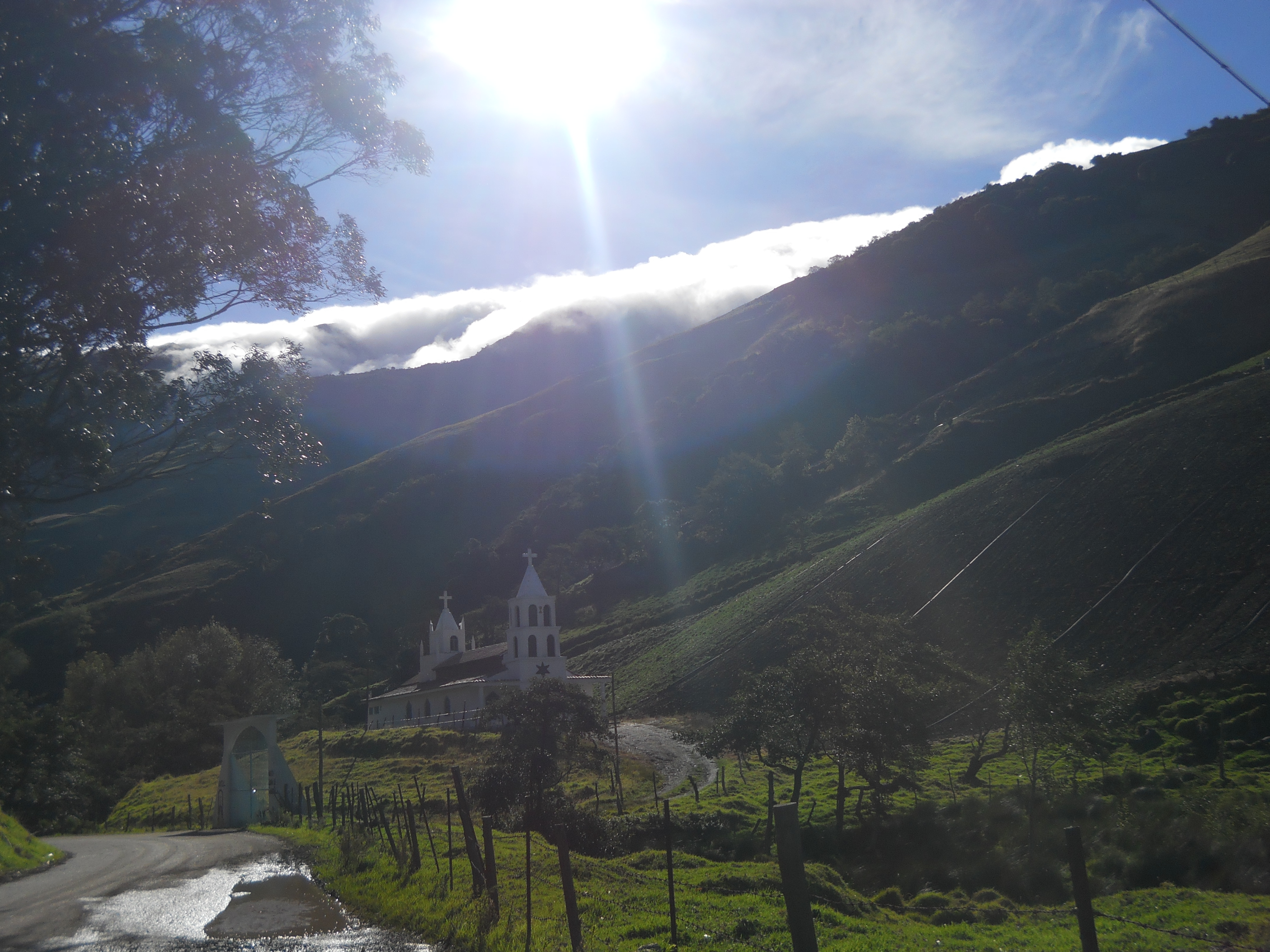
Las Porqueras Park in La Grita

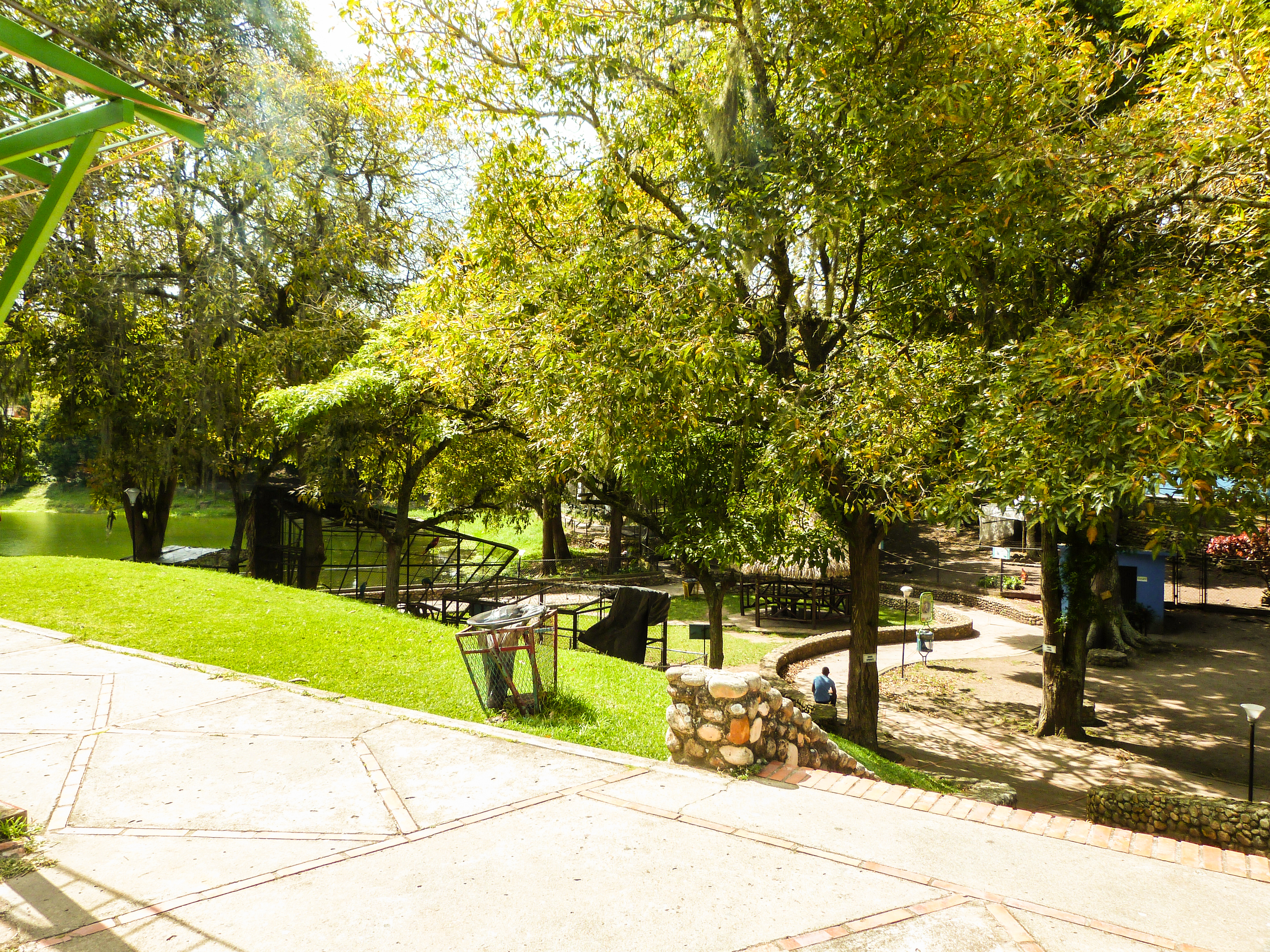
La Laguna Zoological Park, in Capacho

The state of Táchira offers different tourist attractions among which the walks on the mountain routes and the moors El Zumbador, Los Rosales, La Negra, el Tamá stand out; the cattle areas of the road to the plain and the South of the Lake (from Maracaibo), the Pan-American route, the traditional and costumbrist towns (Peribeca, San Pedro del Río, El Cobre, Pregonero), the architecture of San Cristóbal, La Grita, the numerous restaurants of typical Andean food, the sporting events held in the city of San Cristóbal (mainly the meetings of the Deportivo Táchira Fútbol Club, of the Venezuelan First Division League), the fairs and patron saint's celebrations, mainly the San Sebastián International Fair (FISS), among many others.

It is also the Táchira center for river sports activities, such as sport fishing (developed in the numerous river courses of the State, mainly in the Uribante, Caparo and Doradas rivers), some activities such as canoeing and other specialties are developed in the artificial lake formed by the Uribante-Caparo dam, of the hydroelectric complex of the same name.

The sites of greatest interest, both tourist and historical, are represented by some buildings of architectural value, which are closely linked with the Tachirenses due to the activities that are developed there such as public buildings, religious centers, entertainment and sports centers.

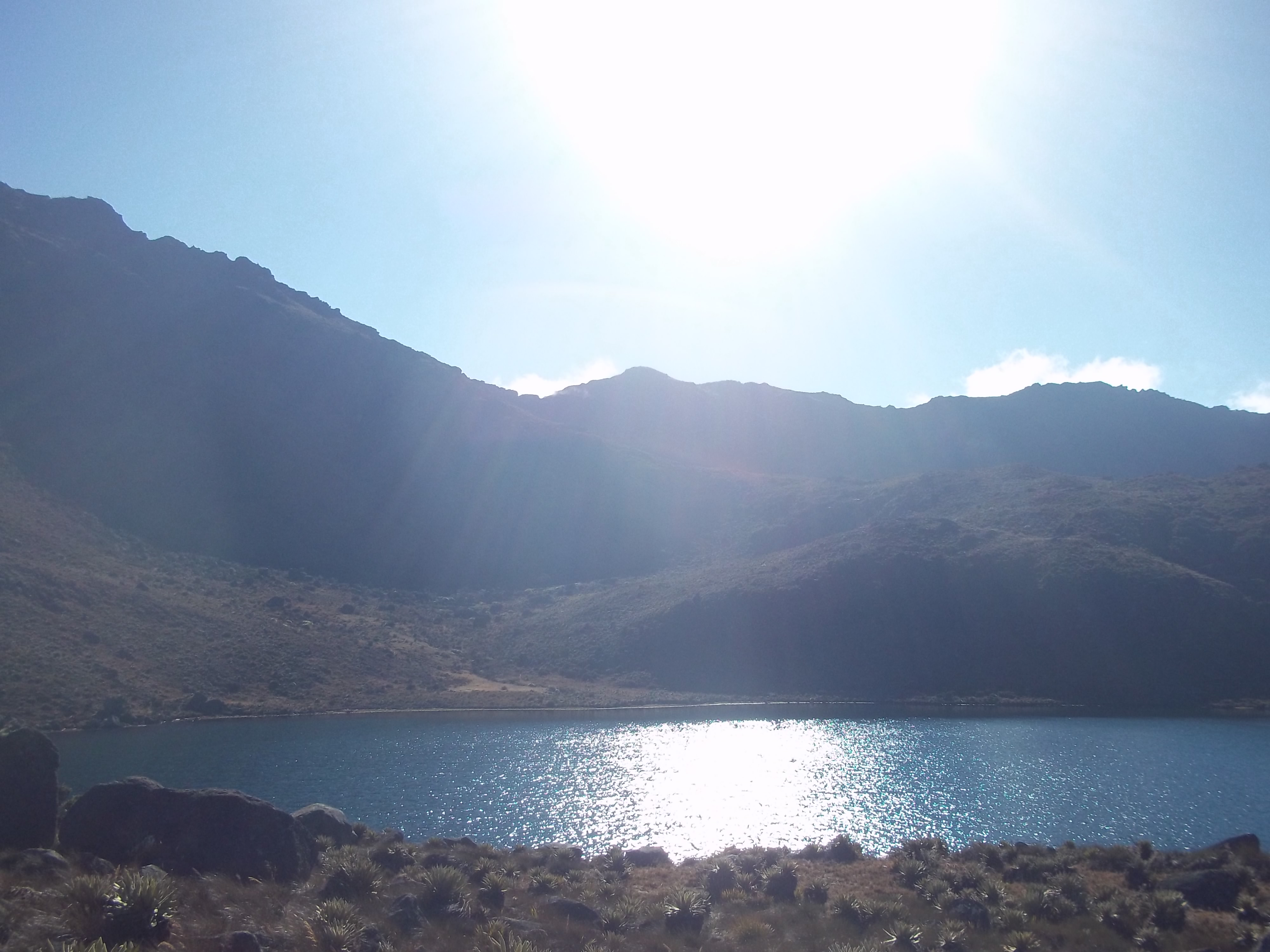
Grande Lagoon, Páramo Batallón y La Negra

The Ateneo del Táchira is the oldest in Venezuela, apart from being the first cultural center erected in the mentioned entity. Its foundation was carried out on April 19, 1907, although the construction that today looks was initiated in 1935, it is located in the street 9 with street 6 in the center of the city of San Cristóbal.

During January the Capital city of San Cristóbal celebrates its fiesta, which is recognized nationally for its industrial, commercial and agricultural exhibitions. During this time there are bull-fights, events, parties, and a number of artists come to have their shows.

=== Important buildings ===
Some important buildings in the capital are:

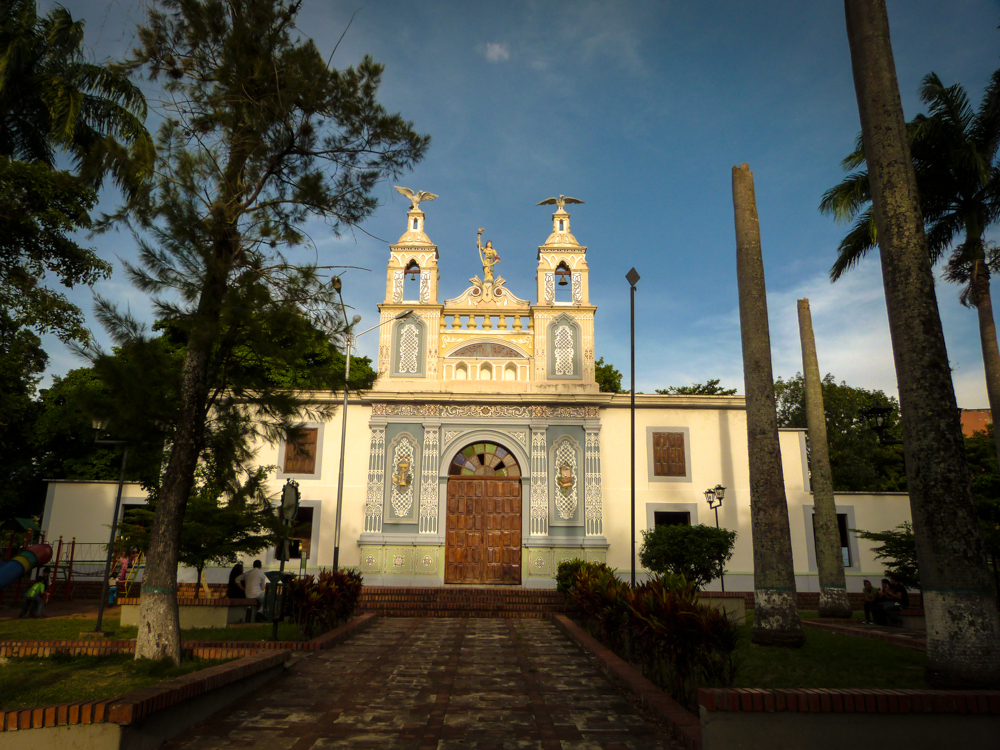
Facade of the Old Vargas Hospital

- San Cristobal Civic Center
- Covered markets: (La Guayana, Metropolitano, Los Pequeños Comerciantes, La Ermita, Santa Teresa).
- "Genaro Mendez" Passenger Terminal"
- Hospital Central de San Cristóbal Dr. José María Vargas (HCSC)
- Sports facilities built for the 2005 Andes National Games, and 2007 Copa America: (Gymnastics Pavilion, indoor soccer stadiums, handball...)
- Metropolitan Baseball Stadium
- New Town Sports Complex.

=== Building heritage ===
- The Ateneo del Táchira or Old Reading Room
- Steinvorth House
- Tachira Anthropological Museum
- Civic Center
- Bridge Liberator
- Christ King Monument-Capacho
- Plaza Monumental de Toros de Pueblo Nuevo
- Bridge Liberator
- Bolivarian Lyceum "Simon Bolivar"
- National School of Dance (ENDANZA Táchira)
- Navy Lighthouse Monument

=== Natural heritage ===
Some natural heritages of the Táchira are:

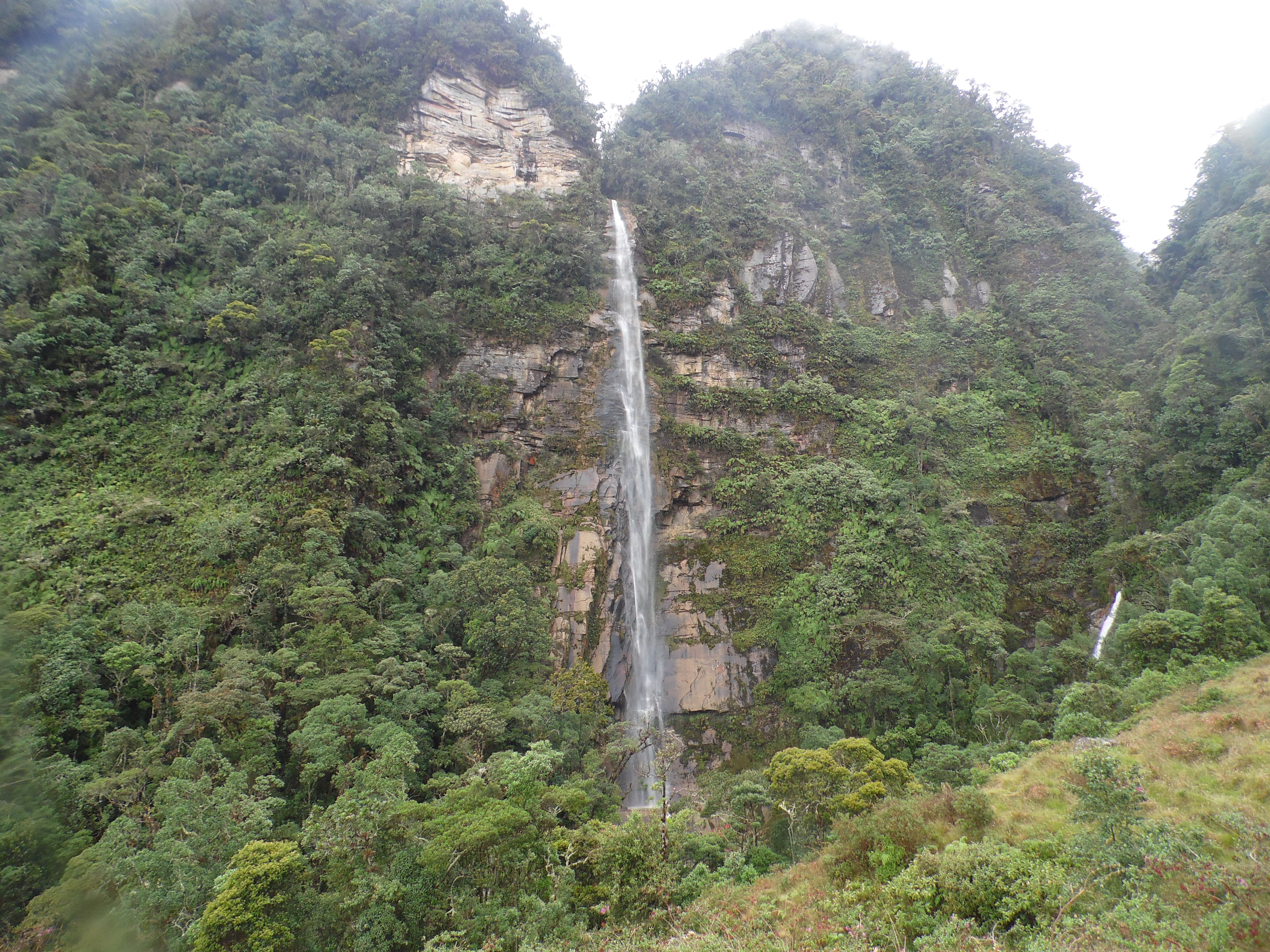
El Chorrerón Waterfall

- Abra de Rio Frio natural monument.
- Chorro El Indio National Park.
- El Tamá National Park.
- Páramo El Zumbador.
- Juan Pablo Peñaloza National Park.
- Casa del Padre (Father's House)
- Thermal waters in Aguas Calientes Ureña
- Cavernas de la Loma del Viento-Casa de John Rivera

== Sports ==
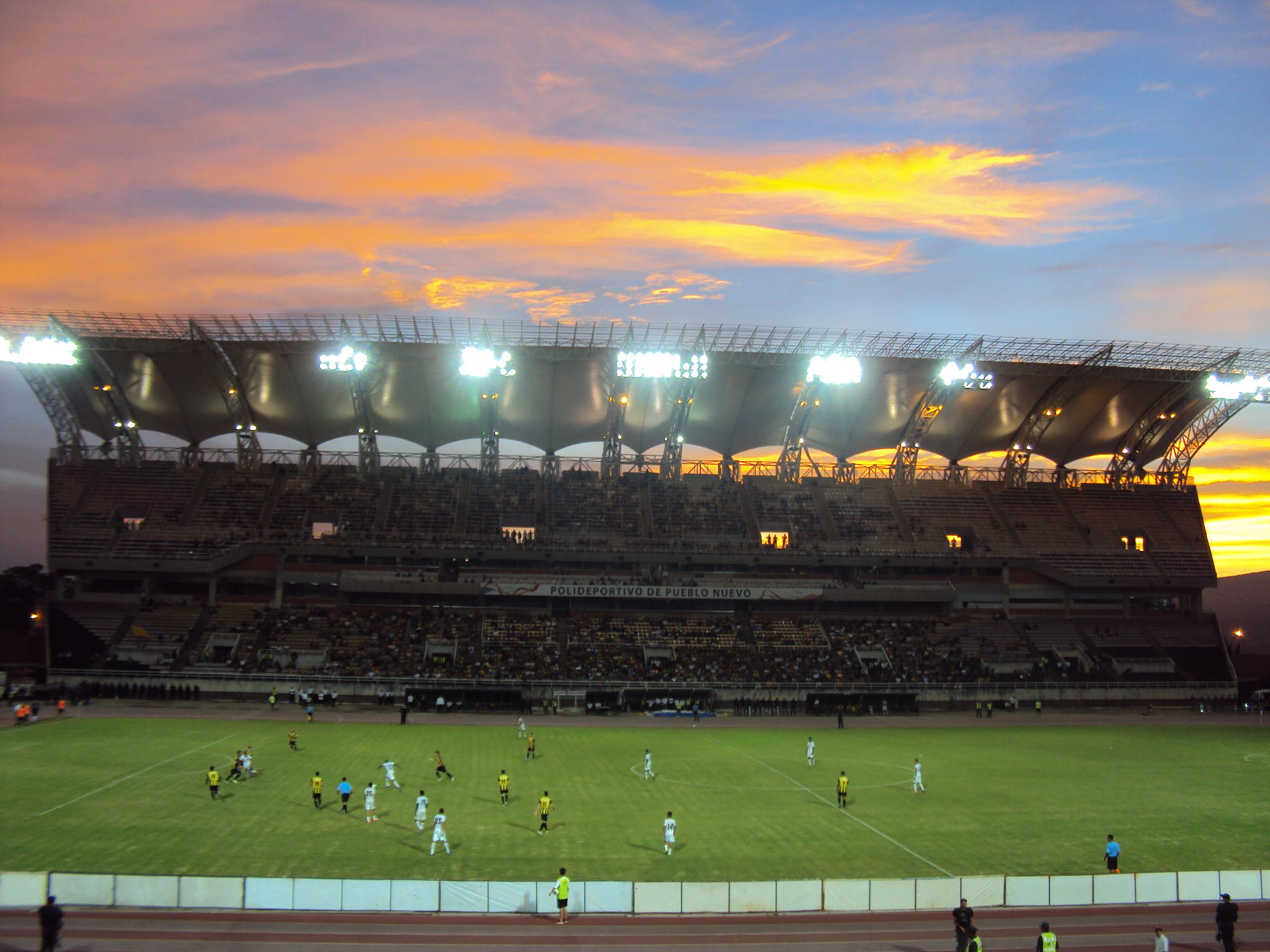
Pueblo Nuevo Stadium, Táchira State

The state of Táchira, together with Mérida and Trujillo, has been characterized as a region where the most popular sport is football. Currently the main football clubs based in the state are Deportivo Táchira F.C., which has won 8 titles in the First Division of Venezuela and also the Venezuelan club that has participated more times (22) in the Libertadores Cup of America; there are also Ureña Sport Club and Real Frontera Sport Club, the latter two members of the Second Division of Venezuela. Among other disciplines the Vuelta al Táchira in bicycle stands out, of great importance at national level, and that marks the beginning of the UCI America Tour.

Some sports facilities include the "Juan Maldonado" Sports Complex, the "La Marina" Park, the "Metropolitano" Park, the "Paramillo" Sports Complex, the "Pueblo Nuevo" Sports Complex which has facilities such as the J. J. Mora Velodrome, the San Cristóbal Metropolitan Stadium, the Monumental Bullring, the Armino Gutiérrez Castro Gymnasium and the Pueblo Nuevo Multi-Sport Stadium.

== Transport ==
El Táchira has important highways and a network of roads that cover much of its territory and communicate with the rest of the country: the Trasandina Highway, the Pan-American Highway or Trunk 1, the road to the plain or Trunk 5 and the San Cristóbal - La Fría Highway that is currently under construction. It also has three international bridges that connect it with neighboring Colombia: International Bridge Simon Bolivar, International Bridge Francisco de Paula Santander and the International Bridge Las Tienditas.

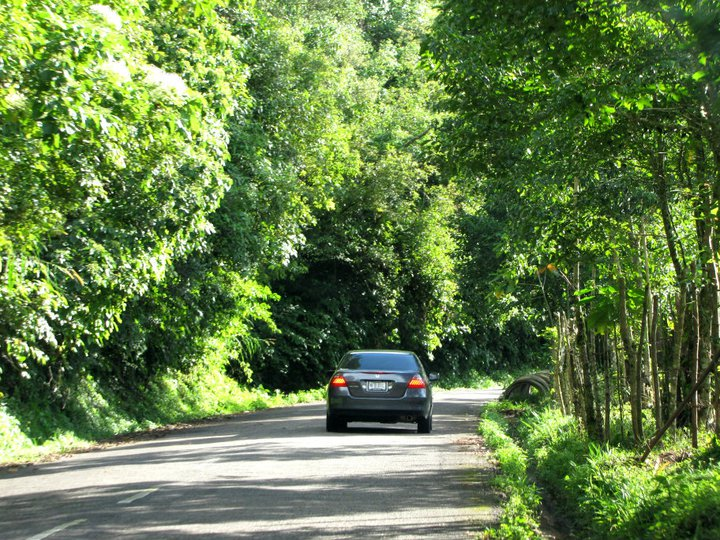
Rural road in Táchira State

The state has 4 airports, of which 3 are classified as international: Juan Vicente Gomez International Airport (closed), Santo Domingo International Airport and the International Airport "Francisco Garcia de Hevia" in La Fria, also has the Paramillo Airport a small capacity airport.

== Media ==
=== Print media ===
The state's newspapers are based in San Cristóbal, these are the Diario Católico and the Diario La Nación. In addition to those mentioned, there is the Diario de los Andes, originally from Trujillo state, which has its own editorial and circulation for Táchira.

=== Television ===
There are regional open-signal television channels:

Televisora Regional del Táchira (TRT), the oldest. TVCT Canal 21, a television plant with an open signal. Buena TV, the most recently created channel. As well as other community channels, such as Vida TV in Rubio and Montaña TV in Cordero. Similarly in Ureña there is a television station that covers the border, on both sides Intercanal Channel 10.

Currently the Colombian channels are transmitted as Channel 1, Citytv and Channel TRO for this state.

=== Radio ===
The radio is the most traditional means of communication in the state, the first receptions were made through the radio service of Venezuela in 1926. In 1933, Radio Táchira, with a small transmitter with a range of less than one kilometer, began to operate informally in the state capital.10 It was the first radio station in the region and one of the pioneers of radio in Venezuela; later, in 1935, it began its formal transmissions, La Voz del Táchira (called Radio Táchira since 1971). Among the most representative capital stations (in AM) are Ecos del Torbes (founded in 1947), which can currently be heard from anywhere in the world and has its own news website; there are also the stations Radio Táchira, Radio Noticias 1060 (formerly Ondas de América and Radio San Cristóbal (in operation since 1954) that belong to the same González Lovera radio circuit and Radio San Sebastián.

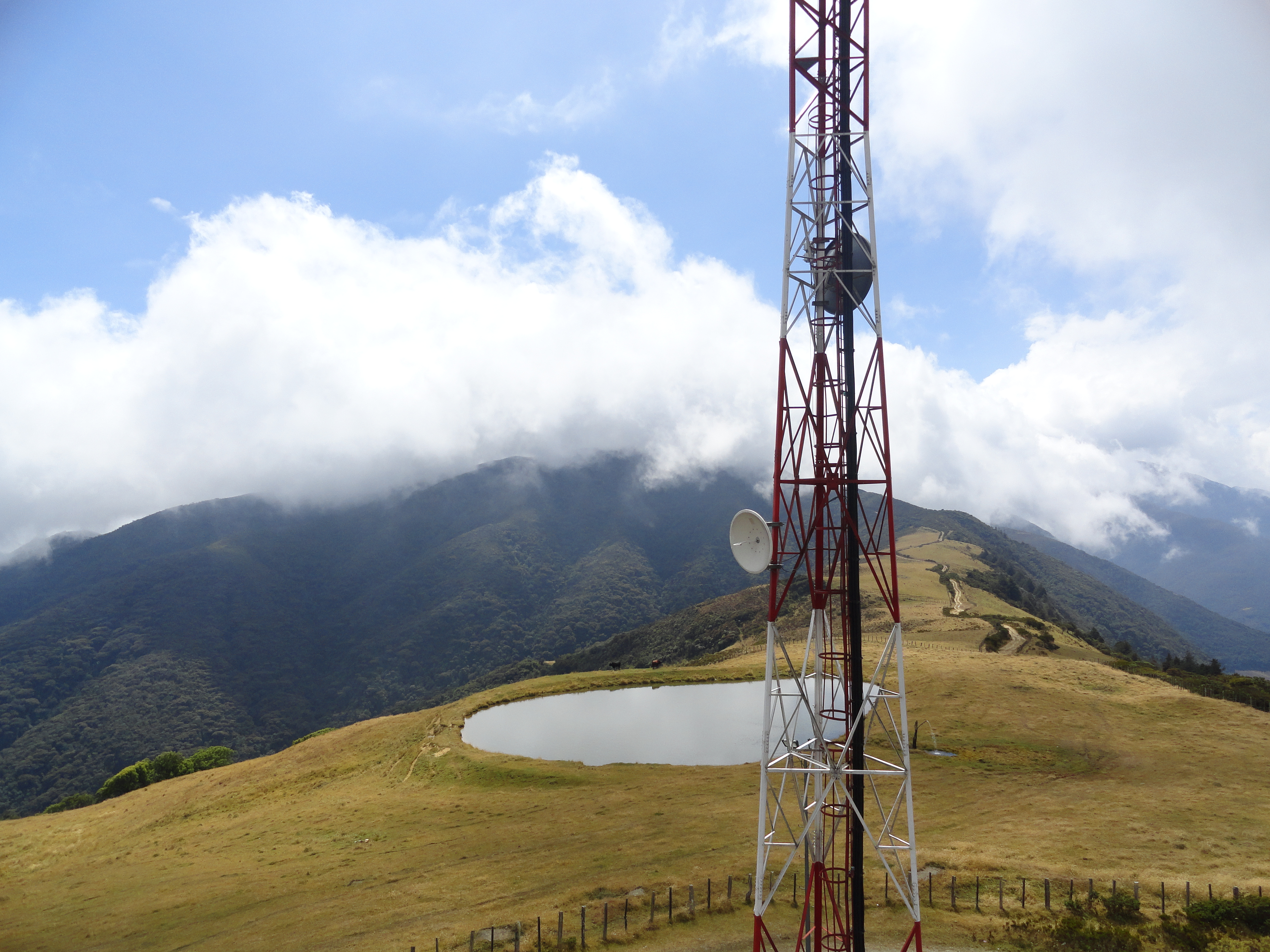
Radio station in Tachira State

In the interior of the state, radio has also reached an important development. Thus, as early as 1954 in the city of Rubio, the station Ecos de Junín began to broadcast, which was later taken to San Cristóbal. In 1965, Radio Frontera emerged in San Antonio del Táchira and in 1970 Radio Sucesos de Táriba and Radio el Sol de La Fría.

FM began to develop in the 1990s with the launch of station 102.1 Stereo, known today as La Mega 102.1FM (currently part of the Mega Circuit). Since then, FM has been widely developed both in the capital and in the interior of the state.

== See also ==
- States of Venezuela
- Potosi, Venezuela
- Táchira emerald, a species of bird named for the state
