= Táchira emerald =

Scientific classification
- Kingdom: Animalia
- Phylum: Chordata
- Class: Aves
- Clade: Strisores
- Order: Apodiformes
- Family: Trochilidae
- Genus: Amazilia
- Species: A. distans

Binomial name
- Amazilia distans Wetmore & Phelps, 1956

Species of bird

The Táchira emerald (Amazilia distans) is a hummingbird described in 1956 by Alexander Wetmore and William Phelps as a new species from a specimen from Venezuela. It is now considered an intergeneric hybrid between the glittering-throated emerald (Amazilia fimbriata) and the white-chinned sapphire (Hylocharis cyanus).
