= Foreign relations of Venezuela =

The foreign relations of Venezuela had since the early twentieth century been particularly strong with the United States. However, since the election of Hugo Chávez as President of Venezuela in 1998, Venezuela's foreign policy differed substantially from that of previous Venezuelan governments. This change in foreign policy direction no longer continues during the tenure of President Delcy Rodríguez.

== Diplomatic relations ==
List of countries which Venezuela maintains diplomatic relations with:

#	Country	Date
1	Colombia	10 June 1833
2	France	20 December 1833
—	Peru (suspended)	23 December 1833
3	United States	7 July 1834
4	United Kingdom	15 August 1835
5	Ecuador	18 August 1835
6	Mexico	8 September 1835
7	Sweden	5 September 1839
8	Denmark	28 February 1842
9	Brazil	5 August 1843
10	Spain	30 March 1845
11	Argentina	14 April 1853
12	Bolivia	14 April 1853
13	Chile	14 April 1853
14	Netherlands	22 March 1856
15	Dominican Republic	19 June 1860
16	Italy	19 June 1861
17	Haiti	10 June 1864
18	Switzerland	10 April 1878
19	Belgium	21 April 1880
—	Holy See	1881
20	Uruguay	27 May 1891
21	Costa Rica	22 June 1891
—	El Salvador (suspended)	22 June 1891
—	Guatemala (suspended)	22 June 1891
22	Honduras	22 June 1891
23	Nicaragua	22 June 1891
—	Paraguay (suspended)	7 August 1891
24	Cuba	14 June 1902
—	Panama (suspended)	3 February 1904
25	Norway	22 November 1905
26	Portugal	11 December 1913
27	Austria	15 January 1924
28	Czech Republic	15 February 1930
29	Poland	18 November 1933
30	Japan	19 August 1938
31	Russia	14 March 1945
32	Syria	14 June 1946
33	Lebanon	10 July 1946
34	Luxembourg	14 March 1950
35	Iraq	22 June 1950
36	Iran	9 August 1950
37	Ethiopia	19 September 1950
38	Turkey	21 September 1950
39	Egypt	16 November 1950
40	Serbia	1 June 1951
41	Germany	28 April 1952
42	Canada	21 November 1952
—	Israel (suspended)	21 November 1952
43	Saudi Arabia	1952
44	Finland	31 March 1954
45	Jordan	1 August 1954
46	Indonesia	10 October 1959
47	India	1 November 1959
48	Trinidad and Tobago	14 September 1962
49	Pakistan	15 April 1964
50	Jamaica	29 July 1964
51	Ghana	16 March 1965
52	Guinea	16 March 1965
53	Liberia	16 March 1965
54	Nigeria	16 March 1965
55	Morocco	18 May 1965
56	Tunisia	26 March 1965
57	South Korea	29 April 1965
58	Libya	18 June 1965
59	Kuwait	13 September 1965
60	Greece	23 February 1966
61	Guyana	19 August 1966
62	Romania	29 January 1967
63	Philippines	27 August 1968
64	Hungary	30 April 1969
65	Barbados	25 September 1969
66	Uganda	27 April 1970
67	Kenya	30 April 1970
68	Ivory Coast	15 July 1970
—	Sovereign Military Order of Malta	3 August 1970
69	Senegal	10 September 1970
70	Algeria	23 March 1971
71	Australia	31 May 1973
72	China	28 June 1974
73	North Korea	28 October 1974
74	Bulgaria	2 August 1974
75	Gambia	17 August 1974
76	Qatar	24 May 1975
77	United Arab Emirates	18 June 1975
78	Bangladesh	9 September 1975
79	Albania	14 October 1975
80	Gabon	11 November 1975
81	Suriname	25 November 1975
82	Mali	24 December 1976
83	Grenada	16 April 1977
84	Bahamas	20 April 1977
85	Bahrain	31 May 1977
86	Malta	17 September 1977
87	Zambia	2 November 1978
88	Dominica	16 January 1979
89	Saint Lucia	14 September 1979
90	Ireland	26 September 1980
91	Iceland	15 January 1981
92	New Zealand	26 February 1981
93	Equatorial Guinea	7 May 1981
94	Rwanda	18 August 1981
95	Saint Vincent and the Grenadines	29 October 1981
96	Tanzania	11 December 1981
97	Thailand	27 August 1982
98	Antigua and Barbuda	15 September 1982
99	Cyprus	1 December 1982
—	Sahrawi Arab Democratic Republic	8 December 1982
100	Fiji	8 April 1983
101	Lesotho	20 June 1983
102	Oman	29 September 1986
103	Saint Kitts and Nevis	31 October 1986
104	Angola	9 December 1986
105	Malaysia	18 December 1986
106	Zimbabwe	7 April 1987
107	Sri Lanka	9 April 1987
108	Nepal	27 April 1987
109	Singapore	1 August 1987
110	Belize	25 April 1989
111	Vietnam	18 December 1989
112	Namibia	22 May 1990
113	Comoros	26 October 1990
114	Sierra Leone	29 October 1990
115	Maldives	1 November 1990
116	Myanmar	20 November 1990
117	Afghanistan	10 December 1990
118	Mongolia	14 December 1990
119	Togo	21 December 1990
120	Papua New Guinea	1 January 1991
121	Seychelles	15 April 1991
122	Benin	20 June 1991
123	Lithuania	10 February 1992
124	Latvia	23 April 1992
125	Slovenia	28 December 1992
126	Slovakia	1 January 1993
127	Croatia	8 February 1993
128	Ukraine	29 September 1993
129	Armenia	30 October 1993
130	South Africa	3 December 1993
131	Estonia	11 July 1994
132	Azerbaijan	12 March 1995
133	Andorra	7 March 1996
134	Moldova	25 April 1996
135	Uzbekistan	26 April 1996
136	Turkmenistan	30 April 1996
137	Kazakhstan	8 May 1996
138	Cambodia	18 June 1996
139	Cameroon	25 June 1996
140	Belarus	4 February 1997
141	Liechtenstein	17 October 1997
142	Bosnia and Herzegovina	13 January 1998
143	North Macedonia	18 April 2002
144	Burkina Faso	2 September 2003
145	Mauritius	2 May 2005
146	Democratic Republic of Congo	3 May 2005
147	Somalia	2 May 2005
148	Sudan	4 May 2005
149	Chad	5 May 2005
150	Brunei	13 July 2005
151	Timor-Leste	5 October 2005
152	Laos	5 October 2005
153	Tajikistan	5 October 2005
154	Niger	8 October 2005
155	Djibouti	8 October 2005
156	Mozambique	16 November 2005
157	Republic of Congo	6 April 2006
158	Guinea-Bissau	6 April 2006
159	Eritrea	7 April 2006
160	São Tomé and Príncipe	19 August 2006
161	Cape Verde	20 September 2006
162	Central African Republic	20 September 2006
163	Eswatini	21 September 2006
164	Malawi	31 January 2007
165	Solomon Islands	8 May 2007
166	Tonga	9 May 2007
167	Nauru	May 2007
168	Botswana	9 July 2007
169	Mauritania	28 September 2007
170	Burundi	30 October 2007
171	Madagascar	17 November 2008
—	State of Palestine	27 April 2009
172	Monaco	27 May 2009
—	South Ossetia	15 September 2009
—	Abkhazia	23 July 2010
173	Montenegro	3 September 2014
174	San Marino	10 November 2014
175	Vanuatu	13 October 2016
176	South Sudan	22 September 2017
177	Kyrgyzstan	27 September 2018
178	Tuvalu	4 August 2021

== Bilateral relations ==
=== Africa ===
Country	Formal Relations Began	Notes
Equatorial Guinea	7 May 1981	Main article: Equatorial Guinea–Venezuela relations
Kenya	30 April 1970	Main article: Kenya–Venezuela relations
Libya	18 June 1965	Main article: Libya–Venezuela relations
Sahrawi Arab Democratic Republic	8 December 1982	Main article: Sahrawi Arab Democratic Republic–Venezuela relations

=== Americas ===
Country	Formal Relations Began	Notes
Antigua and Barbuda	15 September 1982	Main article: Antigua and Barbuda–Venezuela relations In June 2009 Antigua and Barbuda became a formal member of the Bolivarian Alliance for the Americas (ALBA) international cooperation organization and the Caribbean oil alliance Petrocaribe. In 2009 Antigua and Barbuda received US$50 million from Venezuela because of the country's membership in this alliance. After American billionaire Allen Stanford's banks failed, Chávez sent financial assistance to Antigua and Barbuda, which was dependent on Stanford's investment when his business empire collapsed.
Argentina	14 April 1853	Main article: Argentina–Venezuela relations US$1.4 billion was traded between Argentina and Venezuela during 2008. Venezuelan President Hugo Chávez met Argentine President Cristina Fernández de Kirchner in Caracas on 11 August 2009. Kirchner called it a "bilateral meeting [...] aimed at deepening our vital integration." The two presidents signed deals intended to see Venezuela import leather, machinery and poultry from Argentina, whilst a rice importation agreement was described by the Argentine President as "the biggest ever in Argentina's history". The deals were said to be worth $1.1 billion. The meeting coincided with visits to Venezuela by dozens of Argentine businessmen. Both embassies were closed in July 2024.
Belize	25 April 1989	Main article: Belize–Venezuela relations
Bolivia	14 April 1853	Main article: Bolivia–Venezuela relations
Brazil	5 August 1843	Main article: Brazil–Venezuela relations Meeting of South American Presidents in Brazil in 2009. Lula da Silva of Brazil is in the center, and Hugo Chávez of Venezuela furthest right. In 2001 Venezuela and Brazil opened a high-voltage power line between the two countries to supply electricity from Venezuela to energy-starved northern Brazil. The line provides cheap hydro-electric power to Brazil and also earns Venezuela tens of millions of dollars every year. In 2007 Brazil and Venezuela pledged closer trade and energy ties, including building a new oil refinery in Brazil. The $4.5bn refinery scheme to be completed in 2010 will be 40%-owned by Venezuela's state oil firm PDVSA, while Brazil's national oil firm Petrobras will hold the rest. Venezuela purchased 1,500 tonnes of coffee beans from Brazil on 10 August 2009 after falling out with Colombia over its decision to allow an increased United States presence in its military bases. On 18 June 2015, a mission of Brazilian senators led by Sen. Aécio Neves (mostly composed by opposition legislatives to Pres. Dilma Rousseff) flew to Caracas with interest to visit Venezuelan prisoner Leopoldo López and families of victims of the protests against President Nicolás Maduro. About a kilometer away from the Simón Bolívar International Airport, the vehicle carrying the senators was prevented to continue the trip after being stopped and surrounded by government protesters. Finally, the Brazilian senators decided to return to Brazil on the same day. The legislative houses Câmara dos Deputados and Senado Federal of Brazil issued motions of rejection to such events. The Ministry of Foreign Affairs of Brazil issued an Official Note expressing his annoyance with the "unacceptable hostile acts" that occurred that day and asking for official explanations from the Government of Venezuela. During the Brazilian government of President Jair Bolsonaro (2019-2022), Brazil cut off diplomatic relations with the current Venezuelan leftwing and disputed government of president Nicolás Maduro. Brazil downgraded its diplomatic relations with the ruling Venezuelan government. Brazil recognised Venezuelan opposition leader Juan Guaidó as the legitimate President of Venezuela. In April 2020, Brazil closed its embassy in Venezuela. in 2022, relations were re-established before the presidency of Luiz Inacio Lula da Silva.
Canada	21 November 1952	Main article: Canada–Venezuela relations Venezuela and Canada have had diplomatic relations since January 1953. The relations between the two countries have been based on mutual commercial interests; especially in technology, oil and gas industry, telecommunications and others. Venezuela is Canada's second largest export market in South America for goods as well as for services. In 2006, goods exports from Canada increased by 14% and the cumulative stock of Canadian investments in Venezuela amounted to $574 million. In January 2019, Canada recognized and endorsed Juan Guaidó's position at the interim President of Venezuela. In June 2019, Canada closed its embassy in Caracas due to diplomatic visas unable to be renewed under President Maduro's government.
Chile	14 April 1853	Main article: Chile–Venezuela relations
Colombia	10 June 1833	Main article: Colombia–Venezuela relations In the 20th century the relationship with Colombia evolved with ups and downs, mostly regarding the Colombia-Venezuela maritime territory dispute over the Gulf of Venezuela. The lowest point in the relationship occurred on 19 August 1987 after the Colombian Corvette ARC Caldas (FM-52) trespassed into disputed waters and then President of Venezuela, Jaime Lusinchi ordered the Venezuelan Air Force to the area and coerced the Colombians. The standoff was resolved through diplomatic channels but the dispute remained. One of the main issues has been the large wave of Colombians that migrated to Venezuela in the 1970s and 1980s, working primarily in low-end jobs. Many Colombian immigrants were imprisoned in Venezuela under deplorable conditions, faced discrimination and endured human rights violations. The Colombian armed conflict has also provoked impasses between the two countries. Military illegal incursions by the two countries' military forces into each other's territory have been frequent since the conflict in Colombia escalated in the 1980s, which subsequently triggered forced displacements in Colombia and into Venezuela. Illegally armed groups also trespassed into Venezuela to commit crimes. Contraband flows from one territory to another depending on supply and demand along the shared porous border of 1,375 miles (2,210 km). Illegal products range from gasoline, drugs and weapons to stolen cars. Since 2002, the relationship between Colombia and Venezuela has fluctuated due to the ideological differences that separate Hugo Chávez and Álvaro Uribe. The relationship between the two countries once again reached a low point in November 2007 after a failed effort to achieve a humanitarian exchange, causing the relations to freeze. Following the revelation in 2009 that Colombia wanted to allow the United States to use it military bases, relations between Colombia and Venezuela soured, with Venezuela opting to shop in countries such as Argentina and Brazil. Trade between the two countries was worth $7 billion in 2008. In August 2009 Venezuela recalled an envoy from Bogotá over accusations Venezuela had provided arms to Colombian rebels, halted the import of Colombian cars and banned a Colombian energy firm from Venezuela's oil-rich Orinoco region. In 2010 the 2010 Colombia-Venezuela diplomatic crisis saw Colombia and Venezuela recall their ambassadors amid allegations by Colombia that Venezuela was actively permitting and supporting FARC/ELN camps on its side of the border. Assisted by UNASUR mediation, the crisis was resolved shortly after the inauguration of new Colombian President Juan Manuel Santos. Santos made efforts to repair his relationship with Chávez in the months following taking office. In February 2019, Venezuelan leader Nicolás Maduro cut off diplomatic ties with Colombia, after the failed shipping of humanitarian aid to Venezuela that year. Following the election of Colombian President Gustavo Petro, the two countries restored diplomatic ties in August 2022.
Cuba	14 June 1902	Main article: Cuba–Venezuela relations Relations between Cuba and Venezuela have significantly improved during the Presidency of Hugo Chávez. Chávez formed a major alliance with Cuba's leadership and significant trade relationship with Cuba since his election in 1999. Chávez described Cuban President Fidel Castro as his mentor and called Cuba "a revolutionary democracy". The bilateral relation includes development aid, joint business ventures, large financial transactions, exchange of energy resources (for example discounted Venezuelan oil in exchange for Cuban doctors) and information technology, and cooperation in the fields of intelligence service and military. Both nations are delivering assets which are inexpensive for the sending country but of high significance for the receiving country.
Ecuador	18 August 1835	Main article: Ecuador–Venezuela relations
El Salvador	22 June 1891 (suspended)	Main article: El Salvador–Venezuela relations: El Salvador has an embassy in Caracas.; Venezuela has an embassy in San Salvador.; In November 2019, the Venezuelan government expelled El Salvador's diplomats in a reciprocal move after El Salvador had expelled Venezuelan diplomats.
Guatemala	22 June 1891 (suspended)	Main article: Guatemala–Venezuela relations: In 2020, Guatemalan President Alejandro Giammattei announced it would sever ties with Venezuela, prompting to close its embassy both in Caracas and Guatemala City, following the ongoing presidential crisis.
Guyana	19 August 1966	Main article: Guyana–Venezuela relations There is a long-standing territorial dispute between the two countries over the area of Orinoco basin. Venezuela claimed more than half of the territory of the British colony of Guyana at the time of the Latin American wars of independence, a dispute that was settled by arbitration in 1899. In 1962 Venezuela declared that it would no longer abide by the arbitration decision, which ceded mineral-rich territory in the Orinoco basin to Guyana. The area is called "Guayana Esequiba" by Venezuela. A border commission was set up in 1966 with representatives from Guyana, Venezuela and Great Britain, but failed to reach agreement. Venezuela vetoed Guyana's bid to become a member of the Organization of American States (OAS) in 1967. In 1969 Venezuela backed an abortive uprising in the disputed area. Under intense diplomatic pressure, Venezuela agreed in 1970 to a 12-year moratorium on the dispute with the Protocol of Port-of-Spain. In 1981, Venezuela refused to renew the protocol. However, with changes to the governments of both countries relations improved, to the extent that in 1990 Venezuela sponsored Guyana's bid for OAS membership.
Haiti	10 June 1864	Main article: Haiti–Venezuela relations
Mexico	8 September 1835	Main article: Mexico–Venezuela relations Historically the two countries have had good diplomatic relations. Ever since both countries became important players in the oil industry, some competitive tensions arose, eventually leading to disputes after Mexico signed an agreement to join NAFTA. During President Vicente Fox's term in the early 2000s, ties between the two countries became critically strained to the point of recalling one another's ambassadors. It has been clear that diplomatic relations between both countries are not indefinitely severed, in recent years numerous groups and organizations, both in holistic and in land are working to restore the diplomatic relationship between the two countries, as they are of strategic economic and cultural importance within the region. In August 2007, after two years of diplomatic absence in either country, normal relations were re-established with the appointment of former foreign minister Roy Chaderton as Venezuela's envoy in Mexico City and the transfer of Jesús Mario Chacón Carrillo, formerly Mexican ambassador to Colombia, to Caracas.: Mexico has an embassy in Caracas.; Venezuela has an embassy in Mexico City.
Panama	3 February 1904 (suspended)	Main article: Panama–Venezuela relations
Paraguay	7 August 1891 (suspended)	Main article: Paraguay–Venezuela relations Paraguay and Venezuela restarted negotiations on an unpaid debt of $250 million owed by Paraguayan oil company Petropar to its counterpart Petróleos de Venezuela after the Presidents of Paraguay and Venezuela met to deal with the financing. In September 2009 Paraguay's President Fernando Lugo revoked plans for US troops to hold joint military exercises and development projects. President Lugo referenced strong regional opposition from countries such as Venezuela, Argentina, Brazil, Bolivia and Ecuador to the expansion of US military bases in Colombia in his decision. However, bilateral relations severed in January 2019 as Paraguayan President Mario Abdo Benítez announced that Paraguay will not recognize Nicolas Maduro as Venezuela's elected president. Paraguay then decided to close its embassy, and withdraw diplomats “in defense of democracy”. Diplomatic relations were re-established on 15 November 2023 before being suspended again in 2025.
Peru	23 December 1833 (suspended)	Main article: Peru–Venezuela relations In October 2021, the new leftist government of Peru re-established diplomatic relations with the Venezuelan government of President Nicolas Maduro after four years. Both embassies were closed after ties were cut off in July 2024.
Trinidad and Tobago	14 September 1962	To the people of Trinidad and Tobago, Venezuela has been a neighbor initially because of the geographical location of the two countries, however over time the geographical and human resources of both countries have allowed for changes in the relationship. Also both countries have had a longstanding diplomatic relationship whereby an embassy was established as far back as 1987 if not earlier. One of the articles of The Double Taxation Relief (Venezuela)Order 1999 – (Legal Notice #348 of the Republic of Trinidad and Tobago) allowed for the protection for the fiscal privileges of diplomatic agents or consular officers. The purpose of the Protocol was for the Avoidance of Double Taxation and the Prevention of Fiscal Evasion and Avoidance with respect to taxes on income and for the Encouragement of International Trade and Investment and included four clauses which "shall be an integral part of the Convention."
United States	7 July 1834	Main article: United States–Venezuela relations United States-Venezuela relations have traditionally been close, characterized by an important trade and investment relationship and cooperation in combating the production and transit of illegal drugs. Recently, there has been tension between the two countries since the election of Presidents Hugo Chávez of Venezuela and George W. Bush of the United States and strong criticism of US politics and military activity; the Socialist United Party was the only group which condemned the killing of Osama Bin Laden. ==== The Roosevelt Corollary and Dollar Diplomacy ==== The Venezuela Crisis of 1902–1903 saw a naval blockade of several months imposed against Venezuela by Britain, Germany and Italy over President Cipriano Castro's refusal to pay foreign debts and damages suffered by European citizens in a recent Venezuelan civil war. Castro assumed that the United States' Monroe Doctrine would see the US prevent European military intervention, but at the time the US saw the Doctrine as concerning European seizure of territory, rather than intervention per se. Though United States Secretary of State Elihu Root characterized Castro as "a crazy brute", President Roosevelt was concerned with the prospects of penetration into the region by the German Empire. With Castro failing to back down, US pressure and increasingly negative British and American press reaction to the affair, the blockading nations agreed to a compromise, but maintained the blockade during negotiations over the details. This incident was a major stimulus behind the Roosevelt Corollary and the subsequent U.S. policy of Dollar Diplomacy in Latin America. During the presidency of Juan Vicente Gómez, petroleum was discovered under Lake Maracaibo. Gómez managed to deflate Venezuela's staggering debt by granting concessions to foreign oil companies, which won him the support of the United States and the European powers. The growth of the domestic oil industry strengthened the economic ties between the U.S. and Venezuela. ==== Bolivarian Revolution ==== Hugo Chávez meeting U.S. Secretary of State Hillary Clinton at the Summit of the Americas, April 2009. After Hugo Chávez was elected President of Venezuela, the long-standing and close diplomatic relationship between Venezuela and the United States deteriorated. Chávez's stance as an OPEC price hawk raised the price of oil for the United States. His public friendship and significant trade relationship with Cuba conflicted with the U.S. foreign policy of isolating Cuba. Long-running ties between the U.S. and Venezuelan militaries were severed. Chávez was intensely critical of U.S. economic and foreign policy: in Iraq, Haiti, Kosovo, Free Trade Area of the Americas and in numerous other areas. Chávez accused the United States of acting like an empire. Chávez also accused the US of involvement in, or at least foreknowledge of, the 2002 Venezuelan coup d'état attempt. According to Business Insider's edition of July 2015, Venezuela was seeking to re-establish diplomatic ties with the United States of America, "Maduro made the first move in March (2015) – around three months after Washington and Havana announced on 17 Dec they were seeking to restore diplomatic ties – by requesting a "direct channel of communication" with U.S. President Barack Obama and the State Department, said the official.
Uruguay	27 May 1891	Main article: Uruguay–Venezuela relations In September 2020, the Foreign Minister of the Uruguayan center-right government of President Luis Lacalle Pou said that the Venezuelan Nicolás Maduro regime is a dictatorship and that Uruguay would no longer encourage dialogue with the Maduro regime.

=== Asia ===
Country	Formal Relations Began	Notes
Azerbaijan	12 March 1995	Main article: Azerbaijan–Venezuela relations
China	28 June 1974	Main article: China–Venezuela relations Countries which signed cooperation documents related to the Belt and Road Initiative. In 2008 the governments of Venezuela and the People's Republic of China launched their first joint space satellite, named Venesat-1. Venezuela's leader Hugo Chávez said the satellite would be a tool of integration for Latin America and the Caribbean regions by saying "This satellite is not for us but for the people of Latin America and the Caribbean. It is a further step towards independence", he said, adding that the project would break the mold of "technological illiteracy." In 2009, China entered into a partnership with Venezuela to launch a railway company in Venezuela which will be 40% controlled by the China Railways Engineering Corporation (CREC) and the remainder by Venezuela. Venezuela outlined the role of the venture as one which would link Venezuela's oil producing regions and agricultural farming areas Also established are military-technological ties with the acquisition of two squadrons (24) of Chinese-built Karakorum-8 trainer jets and ground radars, signalling a greater Chinese involvement in Latin America. Oil exports to China are set to increase substantially. In September 2008 Venezuela signed a series of energy co-operation deals with China with the President of Venezuela stating that oil exports could rise threefold by 2012, to one million barrels a day. In February 2009 Venezuela and China agreed to double their joint investment fund to $12 billion and signed agreements to boost co-operation which include increasing oil exports from Venezuela, China's fourth biggest oil provider. An oil refinery is planned to be built in China to handle Venezuelan heavy crude from the Orinoco basin. "It is part of a strategic alliance" Venezuelan President Hugo Chávez said, after meeting the visiting Chinese Vice President Xi Jinping who stated that "our co-operation is highly beneficial". In September 2009 Venezuela announced a new $16bn deal with China to drill for oil in a joint venture with PDVSA to produce 450,000 barrels per day (72,000 m^{3}/d) of extra heavy crude. Hugo Chávez stated that "In addition, there will be a flood of technology into the country, with China going to build drilling platforms, oil rigs, railroads, houses." When Hugo Chávez came to power, trade with China had peaked under $200mn but since then it has jumped to nearly $10bn. Chinese officials say that Venezuela has now become the biggest recipient of its investments in Latin America. Venezuela has also embarked on a programme of cultural and scientific exchange with China.
Georgia		Georgia does not maintain formal diplomatic relations with Venezuela, since Venezuela recognises Abkhazia and South Ossetia as independent countries.
India	1 November 1959	Main article: India–Venezuela relations India's country run ONGC Videsh Limited oil and gas exploration and production company helped certify heavy oil reserves in the Orinoco river belt. In the year 2010, A consortium led by Indian state-owned oil companies also won a global bid to claim 40% stake in an important oil block in Venezuela, giving India the capability of producing 400,000 barrels of crude oil per day in its peak time. Diplomatic relations between India and Venezuela were established on 1 October 1959. India maintains an embassy in Caracas, while Venezuela maintains an embassy in New Delhi. There have been several visits by heads of state and government, and other high-level officials between the countries. President Hugo Chávez visited New Delhi on 4–7 March 2005. Chávez met with Indian President APJ Abdul Kalam and Prime Minister Manmohan Singh. The two countries signed six agreements including one to establish a joint commission to promote bilateral relations and another on cooperation in the hydrocarbon sector. Foreign Minister Nicolás Maduro visited India to attend the First Meeting of the India-CELAC Troika Foreign Ministers meeting in New Delhi on 7 August 2012. The Election Commission of India (ECI) and the National Electoral Council (CNE) of Venezuela signed an MoU during a visit by Indian Election Commissioner V S Sampath to Caracas in 2012. Minister of State for Corporate Affairs visited Venezuela to attend the state funeral of President Chávez in March 2013. The President and Prime Minister of India expressed condolences on the death of Chávez. The Rajya Sabha, the upper house of Parliament, observed a minute's silence to mark his death. Ambassador Smita Purushottam represented India at the swearing-in ceremony of Chávez's successor Nicolás Maduro on 19 April 2013. Citizens of Venezuela are eligible for scholarships under the Indian Technical and Economic Cooperation Programme and the Indian Council for Cultural Relations. India's pharmaceutical major, Cipla has 120 medications approved to market in Venezuela, and made nearly $15 million in revenue the year 2006.
Indonesia	10 October 1959	Main article: Indonesia–Venezuela relations On 12 August 2000, Venezuelan president Hugo Chávez visited Jakarta and paid courtesy call to Indonesian president Abdurrahman Wahid. Subsequently, in the next month on 26–28 September 2000 Indonesian president Abdurrahman Wahid visited Caracas to attend the OPEC summit, and paid a courtesy call to Hugo Chávez. Venezuela has donated US$2 million for the relief effort promptly after the tsunami devastated Aceh in 2004. Venezuela also promoted education in Aceh by establishing Institute of Polytechnic of Venezuela-Indonesia in Aceh inaugurated in 2009.
Iran	9 August 1950	Main article: Iran–Venezuela relations The presidents of Venezuela and Iran in 2009, President Hugo Chávez and President Ahmadinejad, respectively, both described themselves on the world stage as opposed to US imperialism. Citing this commonality of opinion, they regarded each other as allies, and they embarked on a number of initiatives together. For example, on 6 January 2007, the two announced that they would use some money from a previously-announced $2bn joint fund to invest in other countries that were "attempting to liberate themselves from the imperialist yoke", in Chávez's words.
Israel	21 November 1952	Main article: Israel–Venezuela relations Israel–Venezuela relations were historically strong, but have soured under the leadership of President Hugo Chávez. In 2006, Israel–Venezuela relations deteriorated further with regards to the 2006 Israel–Lebanon conflict, and also due to Hugo Chávez's foreign policy relating to Iran and Israel's political opposition to it. Chávez also positioned himself on the world stage as opposed to American foreign policy — the US and Israel are partners in defense and international relations, specifically relating to the Middle East. In the wake of the 2008–2009 Israel–Gaza conflict, Venezuela has broken all diplomatic ties with the state of Israel, condemning its actions. Venezuela voted in favor of Israeli membership in the United Nations on 27 November 1947 and established diplomatic ties. During the Six-Day War many Venezuelan Jews went to Israel to fight for Israel. When the United Nations passed General Assembly Resolution 3379 on 10 November 1975, "determin[ing] that Zionism is a form of racism and racial discrimination", Venezuela abstained. The resolution was later revoked. Israeli Foreign Minister Shimon Peres visited Caracas in January 1995, during the second Caldera administration, to "cement ties with friendly countries, and to deepen cooperation in areas of mutual benefit". Venezuela's Foreign Minister noted that "The reception that was given for Foreign Minister Peres was unprecedented." President Hugo Chávez broke off diplomatic ties and expelled the Israeli ambassador after the 2008–2009 Gaza War which left around 1,200 Palestinians dead and over 5000 wounded. In January 2019, Israel recognized opposition leader Juan Guaido as interim president of Venezuela.
Japan	19 August 1938	Main article: Japan–Venezuela relations In 1999, Venezuelan President Hugo Chávez made a three-day trip to Japan. Japanese banks Marubeni and Mitsui loaned Venezuela $3.5 billion in 2007 to be repaid in oil. The Japan Bank for International Cooperation provided $1.89 billion in loans to support the banks. Hugo Chávez made another two-day trip in 2009, during which he met Prime Minister Taro Aso. During the trip they agreed to cooperate on oil and gas developments and form a committee to study financing development and exploration. Japan and Venezuela signed a dozen other accords as part of Chávez's visit. In February 2019, Japan recognized Venezuelan opposition leader Juan Guaidó as Venezuela's legitimate president.
Malaysia	18 December 1986	Main article: Malaysia–Venezuela relations Malaysia has had an embassy in Caracas since 1990, while Venezuela has an embassy in Kuala Lumpur.
Myanmar	20 November 1990	Main article: Myanmar–Venezuela relations The Ambassador of Venezuela in Vietnam is accredited to Myanmar.
Nepal	27 April 1987	Nepal and the Bolivarian Republic of Venezuela established diplomatic relations on 28 April 1987. The Ambassador of Venezuela in India is accredited to Nepal. The Embassy of Nepal in Brasília is currently accredited to Venezuela
North Korea	28 October 1974	Main article: North Korea–Venezuela relations
Philippines	27 August 1968	Main article: Philippines–Venezuela relations Venezuela and the Philippines share a Hispanic heritage and relations between the two countries has been warm and friendly since it formal establishment of ties on 27 August 1968. Venezuela has an embassy in Manila and the Philippines has an embassy in Caracas. Venezuelan President Hugo Chávez made a state visit in the Philippines in 1999 and signed the RP-Venezuela Memorandum of Understanding on Tourism Cooperation and a Memorandum of Understanding on Trade and Investment. Venezuela is the Philippines' 5th largest trading partner in South America with Philippine exports increasing to 38 million dollars in 2004, compared to just 1.6 million dollars of 2003. The Philippines is willing to work with Venezuela in both energy and power industries.
South Korea	29 April 1965	Main article: South Korea–Venezuela relations
Taiwan		Main article: Taiwan–Venezuela relations Relations have almost been nonexistent since Venezuela recognized the People's Republic of China in 1974, although unofficial relations have been preserved through a Taipei Economic and Cultural Representative Office in Caracas. In the 2000s, increasing partnership between the government of the Venezuelan president Hugo Chávez and People's Republic of China has led to a more overt rejection of the Republic of China's legitimacy by Venezuela. Taipei Commercial Office in Bogotá, Colombia is currently accredited to Venezuela.
Turkey	21 September 1950	Main article: Turkey–Venezuela relations: Turkey has an embassy in Caracas and an Honorary Consulate in Maracaibo.; Venezuela has an embassy in Ankara and a Consulate General in Istanbul.; Trade volume between the two countries was 150 million USD USD in 2019 (Venezuelan exports/imports: 20/130 million USD.
Vietnam	18 December 1989	Main article: Venezuela–Vietnam relations Vietnam and Venezuela set up diplomatic ties in 1989. Since 2006 Vietnam has had an embassy in Caracas and Venezuela has an embassy in Hanoi. Though bilateral trade was $11.7 million in 2007 relations show "great potential". Over the past ten years, the two countries have witnessed new developments in various fields, including politics, economics, culture and society, particularly in the oil and gas industry. Venezuelan President Hugo Chávez visited Vietnam in 2006 and since then his government stepped up bilateral relations with the country, which also included receiving the Communist Party General Secretary, Nông Đức Mạnh in 2007. Petróleos de Venezuela and Petrovietnam also announced a number of joint projects following the 2006 visit, including Petrovietnam being given a concession in the Orinoco basin and an agreement to transport Venezuelan oil to Vietnam, where the two would together build an oil refinery that Vietnam lacks. On the 2006 visit Chávez praised Vietnam's "revolutionary" history as he attacked the United States for its "imperialist" crimes in the Vietnam War. On the 2008 visit Vietnamese President Nguyễn Minh Triết returned similar comments as he lauded a group of Venezuelans who captured a US soldier during the Vietnam War in an unsuccessful bid to prevent the execution of a Vietnamese revolutionary. The two leaders also signed a deal for a $200 million joint fund and 15 cooperation projects. President Triết arrived in Caracas on 18 November 2008 for a two-day official visit on an invitation from Chávez. In March 2008 an agreement was signed to cooperate in tourism between Vietnam and Venezuela. President Nguyễn Minh Triết received the PDVSA's Vice President Asdrúbal Chávez and stated that oil and gas cooperation would become a typical example of their multi-faceted cooperation. In 2009 the Venezuelan government approved $46.5 million for an agricultural development project with Vietnam.

=== Europe ===
Country	Formal Relations Began	Notes
Denmark	28 February 1842	Main article: Denmark–Venezuela relations
France	20 December 1833	Main article: France–Venezuela relations France has an embassy in Caracas and Venezuela has an embassy in Paris. During the 1992 Venezuelan coup d'état attempts, the French Government "immediately signalled its refusal to accept a breakdown in institutional legitimacy. President Hugo Chávez met French President Jacques Chirac on three occasions in October 2002, March 2005 and October 2005. In 2007, Chávez visited French President Nicolas Sarkozy to discuss the situation of hostage Ingrid Betancourt held in Colombia. In September 2008, Chávez again visited Sarkozy and Chávez said he sought aid from "friendly" countries like France, in exchange for "Venezuelan energy". In October 2008, the Venezuelan and French Foreign Ministers signed 10 agreements on cooperation including bilateral cooperation on energy, military, telecommunications, tourism and fight against drug trafficking. In 2000, French company Pechiney signed an agreement with the Venezuela government to invest USD 260 million over three years to expand state-owned bauxite and alumina. As of 2005, French oil company TotalEnergies was the largest foreign investor in Venezuela. In 2005, Total commenced negotiations with the Venezuelan Government over a possible US$5 billion project to develop heavy oil in eastern Venezuela. In April 2006, the Venezuelan government seized control of foreign owned oil fields including those operated by Total. In February 2019, France joined major EU countries and United States in recognising opposition leader Juan Guaidó as Venezuela’s interim president. In December 2025, Jay Dharmadhikari, who serves as the Ambassador and Deputy Permanent Representative of France to the UN Security Council, commented on the rising tensions between the United States and Venezuela by stating, "It is essential that any measures taken to address drug trafficking comply with international law."
Germany	28 April 1952	Main article: Germany–Venezuela relations
Greece	23 February 1966	Main article: Greece–Venezuela relations
Holy See	1881	Main article: Holy See–Venezuela relations Both countries established diplomatic relations in 1869. The Holy See has a nunciature in Caracas. Venezuela has an embassy in Rome. There were tensions with the Vatican under the presidency of Hugo Chávez, a president who, while being Catholic, was ideologically influenced by Karl Marx, Vladimir Lenin and Simón Bolívar, political thinkers that have historically been opposed to the influence of the Roman Catholic Church. Chávez also cited his support for the liberation theology of Leonardo Boff, which Rome had opposed in the 1970s and 1980s.
Italy	19 June 1861	Main article: Italy–Venezuela relations
Netherlands	22 March 1856	Main article: Netherlands–Venezuela relations In January 2010, the Dutch PM Balkenende dismissed the allegations of Chávez that US war planes were being deployed as part of a planned attack. During a television interview Chávez had said "We accuse the American and the Dutch governments of provoking Venezuela and planning aggression". He showed a photograph of a US P3 warplane as proof. According to Balkenende the planes were being used to combat drug trafficking and the picture had been "taken from Wikipedia" and was dated from 2002.
Poland	18 November 1933	Main article: Poland–Venezuela relations
Portugal	11 December 1913	Main article: Portugal–Venezuela relations Portugal and Venezuela meet regularly in the Ibero-American Summit and the Venezuela-Portugal Mixed Commission of Bilateral Monitoring created in 2008. Economic, diplomatic and friendship ties between Venezuela and Portugal developed significantly during Chávez presidency. Chávez also acknowledged the importance of the large Portuguese community in Venezuela. During his term, he made four official visits at Portugal. In 2018, Portugal and Venezuela signed 22 bilateral agreements with each other, Venezuela's Foreign Minister Jorge Arreaza described Portugal as a fundamental ally in support of the Bolivarian government during the "economic siege that the United States has waged against Venezuela".
Russia	14 March 1945	Main article: Russia–Venezuela relations Venezuela remains as one of Russia's most important trading and military allies in Latin America (after Brazil), making a strong bond in the bilateral relations between the two nations. Relations have become increasingly closer with Venezuela, the most recent visible results of which being Venezuela becoming the third nation to officially recognize the independence of Abkhazia and South Ossetia and Russia approving a $2 billion loan to Venezuela for arms in September 2009.
Serbia	1 June 1951	Main article: Serbia–Venezuela relations: After the 2008 Kosovo declaration of independence, Venezuelan President Hugo Chávez announced that Venezuela does not recognise Kosovo's independence on the grounds that it has been achieved through U.S. pressure, saying "This cannot be accepted. It's a very dangerous precedent for the entire world.". On 24 March 2008, Chávez accused Washington of trying to "weaken Russia" by supporting independence for Kosovo. He called Kosovo's new leader, Prime Minister Hashim Thaçi, a "terrorist" put in power by the U.S. and noted that the former rebel leader's nom de guerre was "The Snake".
Spain	30 March 1845	Main article: Spain–Venezuela relations In January 2019, Spain was the first leading EU country to recognize Venezuelan opposition leader Juan Guaidó as interim president.: Spain has an embassy in Caracas.; Venezuela has an embassy in Madrid and consulates-general in Barcelona, Bilbao,Santa Cruz de Tenerife, and Vigo.
Sweden	5 September 1839	Main article: Sweden–Venezuela relations: Sweden is represented in Venezuela through its embassy in Bogotá, Colombia. Consulates-generales in Caracas and consulate in Porlamar, Isla Margarita.
Ukraine	29 September 1993	Main article: Ukraine–Venezuela relations
United Kingdom	15 August 1835	Main article: United Kingdom–Venezuela relations: Venezuela maintains an embassy in London.; The United Kingdom is accredited to Venezuela through its embassy in Caracas.; Both countries share common membership of the International Criminal Court, and the World Trade Organization. Bilaterally the two countries have an Investment Agreement. In February 2019, United Kingdom recognized opposition leader Juan Guaidó as the interim president of Venezuela.

=== Oceania ===
Country	Formal Relations Began	Notes
Solomon Islands	8 May 2007	Main article: Solomon Islands–Venezuela relations In October 2008 Solomons Prime Minister Derek Sikua moved to establish economic relations with Venezuela, hoping to benefit from comparatively cheap Venezuelan oil. In the context of the 2008 financial crisis, it was believed that it would bring down the price of oil for Solomon Islanders, and boost the economy if the Solomons imported crude Venezuelan oil, refined it and then exported it to neighbouring countries.

== Multilateral organizations ==
=== Organisation of American States ===
By virtue of its geographical location, Venezuela became one of the members of the Organisation of American States (OAS) on "April 30, 1948" when they signed the "CHARTER OF THE ORGANIZATION OF AMERICAN STATES (A-41)". On 21 December 1951, the treaty was ratified by Venezuela "IN ACCORDANCE WITH ARTICLE 145 OF THE CHARTER".

In looking at the treaty, one would note that there are three parts with twenty-two chapters in total to the Treaty of the OAS. According to the OAS website. "Chapter XXI RATIFICATION AND ENTRY INTO FORCE, Article 141" the OAS Treaty or Charter "shall be registered with the Secretariat of the United Nations through the General Secretariat"

In accordance with "Chapter XIII THE INTER-AMERICAN COUNCIL FOR INTEGRAL DEVELOPMENT- Article 94 – The purpose of the Inter-American Council for Integral Development is to promote cooperation among the American States for the purpose of achieving integral development and, in particular, helping to eliminate extreme poverty, in accordance with the standards of the Charter, especially those set forth in Chapter VII with respect to the economic, social, educational, cultural, scientific, and technological fields." To a large extent over the years, the people of Trinidad and Tobago have benefited from the generosity of the Venezuelans, whether it was due to their innate ability to give and share or whether it was provided by the articles of the Treaty as a means to share and for that they are grateful.

On 26 April 2017, Venezuela announced its intention to withdraw from the OAS. Venezuelan Foreign Minister Delcy Rodríguez said that President Nicolás Maduro plans to publicly renounce Venezuela's membership on 27 April 2017. It will take two years for the country to formally leave. During this period, the country does not plan on participating in the OAS.

==== Summits of the Americas ====
"The Summits of the Americas are institutionalized gatherings of the heads of state and government of the Western Hemisphere where leaders discuss common policy issues, affirm shared values and commit to concerted actions at the national and regional level to address continuing and new challenges faced in the Americas. To date there have been seven Summits of the Americas. There have also been at least two Special Meetings which were held between 1996 and 2004.

"At the Third Summit," which was held in Quebec, Canada in 2001 "leaders instructed their foreign ministers to prepare an Inter-American Democratic Charter which was adopted on September 11, 2001 in Lima".

The Fifth Summit of the Americas was held in Port of Spain, Trinidad and Tobago in 2009 was attended by Hugo Chávez on behalf of Venezuela. Also in attendance were Prime Minister Patrick Manning of Trinidad and Tobago and President Barack Obama of the United States of America.

The Seventh Summit of the Americas was held in Panama City, Panama on 10–11 April 2015.

Peru will host the Eighth Summit of the Americas in 2018.

==== Indigenous Leaders Summits of Americas (ILSA) ====
With Venezuela having tribes of indigenous persons, given the geographical location of the country, recent developments in the oil and gas sector internationally and offshore, (such as Eliza I and II, the developments offshore of Suriname) the contributions of the Venezuelans to the OAS with respect to this area, that is, indigenous people may be significant going forward.

The position of the OAS with respect to indigenous persons appears to be developing over the years. The following statements appear to capture the position of the OAS with respect to the ILSA :"The "OAS has supported and participated in the organisation of Indigenous Leaders Summits of Americas (ILSA)" according to the OAS's website. The most recent "statement made by the Heads of State of the hemisphere was in the Declaration of Commitments of Port of Spain in 2009 – Paragraph 86" according to the OAS's website."

The Draft American Declaration of the Rights of the Indigenous Persons appears to be a working document. The last "Meeting for Negotiations in the Quest for Consensus on this area appeared to be Meeting Number (18) eighteen and is listed as being held in May 2015 according to the website.

=== Betancourt Doctrine ===
The Betancourt Doctrine, named after one of the first presidents of Venezuela's democratic era, Rómulo Betancourt "whereby Venezuela refused to maintain diplomatic relations with governments formed as a result of military coups, was adhered to by both administrations (first two presidents of Venezuela's democratic era). Although the doctrine was much praised, it gradually isolated Venezuela as most other Latin American nations became dominated by nonelected regimes."

=== Other international organisations to which Venezuela belongs ===
"In the democratic era, Venezuela has attempted to fulfill the principles of Simon Bolivar's ideals through a variety of means. It maintained active membership in the United Nations (UN) and its related agencies, other than this; the Organization of the Petroleum Exporting Countries (OPEC), the Organization of American States (OAS) and its related entities, and a host of other world and hemispheric organizations. In all these forums, Venezuela consistently aligned itself with other democracies" Venezuela and the United States belong to a number of the same international organizations, including the related agencies of the UN such as the International Monetary Fund, World Bank, and World Trade Organization.

In October 2019, Venezuela competed for one of the two seats to the United Nations Human Rights Council, along with Brazil and Costa Rica, and was elected with 105 votes in a secret ballot by the 193-member United Nations General Assembly. Brazil was re-elected with 153 votes, while Costa Rica was not having garnered 96 votes and entering the month of the election as competition to Venezuela. The United States, Lima Group and human rights groups lobbied against Venezuela's election.

When the UN General Assembly voted to add Venezuela to the UN Human Rights Council in October 2019, US Ambassador to the UN Kelly Craft wrote: "I am personally aggrieved that 105 countries voted in favor of this affront to human life and dignity. It provides ironclad proof that the Human Rights Council is broken, and reinforces why the United States withdrew." Venezuela had been accused of withholding from the Venezuelan people humanitarian aid delivered from other nations, and of manipulating its voters in exchange for food and medical care. The council had been criticized regularly for admitting members who were themselves suspected of human rights violations.

== International disputes ==
=== Border dispute ===
Venezuela claims most of Guyana west of the Essequibo River, in a dispute which dates back to the early nineteenth century and which saw the Venezuela Crisis of 1895. It also has a maritime boundary dispute with Colombia in the Gulf of Venezuela. The country also has an active maritime boundary dispute with Dominica over the Isla Aves archipelago located in the Caribbean.

== See also ==
- Foreign policy of the Hugo Chávez government
- List of diplomatic missions in Venezuela
- List of diplomatic missions of Venezuela
- Maletinazo
