= Gloria Notaro =

Ambassador of Venezuela to the Netherlands

Ambassador of Venezuela to the Netherlands
- In office 19 February 2019 – 11 June 2019
- Appointed by: National Assembly of Venezuela
- President: Juan Guaidó
- Succeeded by: Isaac Salama

Gloria Notaro was the first ambassador of Venezuela to the Netherlands appointed by the National Assembly during the Venezuelan presidential crisis, on 19 February 2019. Notaro was succeeded as ambassador by Isaac Salama, after he was appointed by the National Assembly on 11 June 2019.

== See also ==
- Netherlands–Venezuela relations
