= Philippines–Venezuela relations =

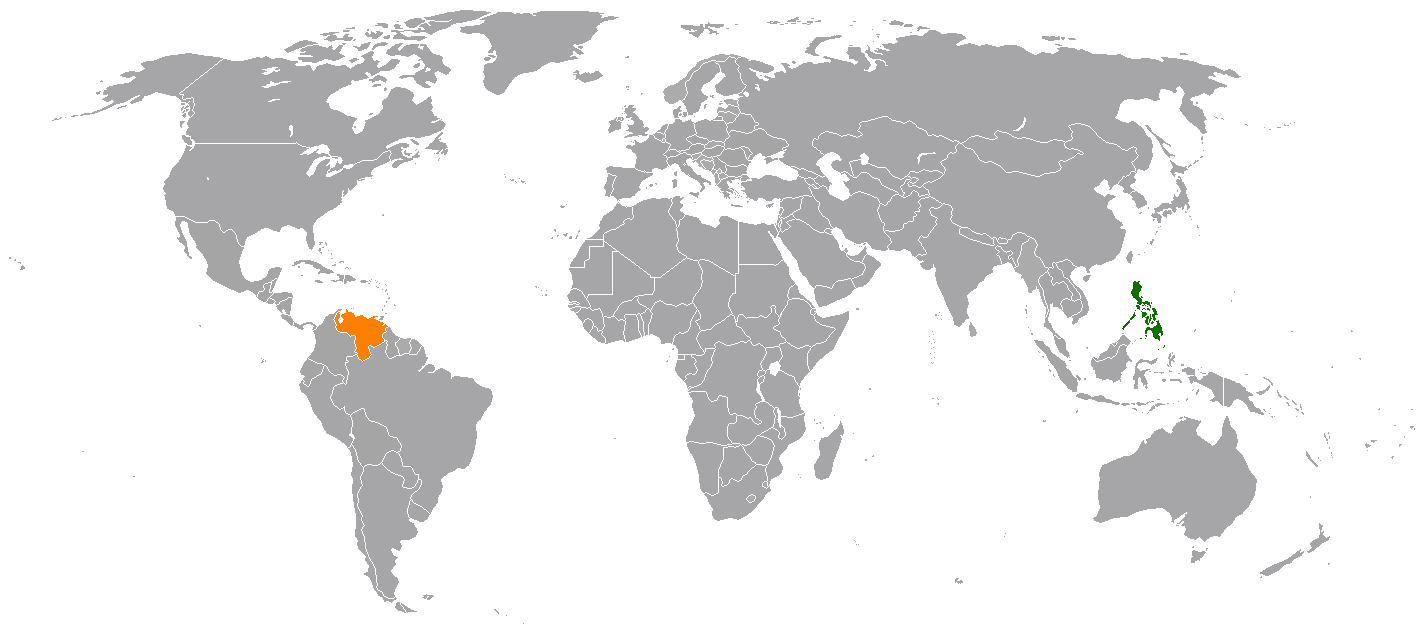

- Philippines: Venezuela

Diplomatic mission
- Embassy of the Philippines, Brasilia, concurrent to Venezuela: Embassy of Venezuela, Manila

The Philippines–Venezuela relations refers to the diplomatic relations between Venezuela and the Philippines. The two countries share common Hispanic heritage. Filipino and Venezuelan relations even predate the establishment of these specific nations. Both the Philippines and Venezuela were part of the same Spanish administrative division, the Viceroyalty of New Spain. During this time, people from the Philippines and Venezuela freely moved into each other's areas since they were considered one cohesive territory. Venezuelan participation in Philippine affairs even endured after Venezuelan independence since it is recorded that Venezuelans were among the Latin American soldiers and officers supporting Emperor Andrés Novales of the Philippines, in his short-lived revolt against Spain. Bilateral relations between the two countries have been warm and friendly since the formal establishment of ties on 27 August 1968. Venezuela has an embassy in Manila and the Philippines is accredited to Venezuela from its embassy in Brasília, Brazil.

== Agreements ==
Then-Venezuelan President Hugo Chavez made a state visit in the Philippines in 1999 and signed the RP-Venezuela Memorandum of Understanding on Tourism Cooperation and a Memorandum of Understanding on Trade and Investment.

== Economic relations ==
Venezuela is the Philippines' 5th largest trading partner in South America with Philippine exports increasing to 38 million dollars in 2004, compared to just 1.6 million dollars of 2003. The Philippines is willing to work with Venezuela in both energy and power industries.

== See also ==
- Foreign relations of the Philippines
- Foreign relations of Venezuela
