= Poland–Venezuela relations =

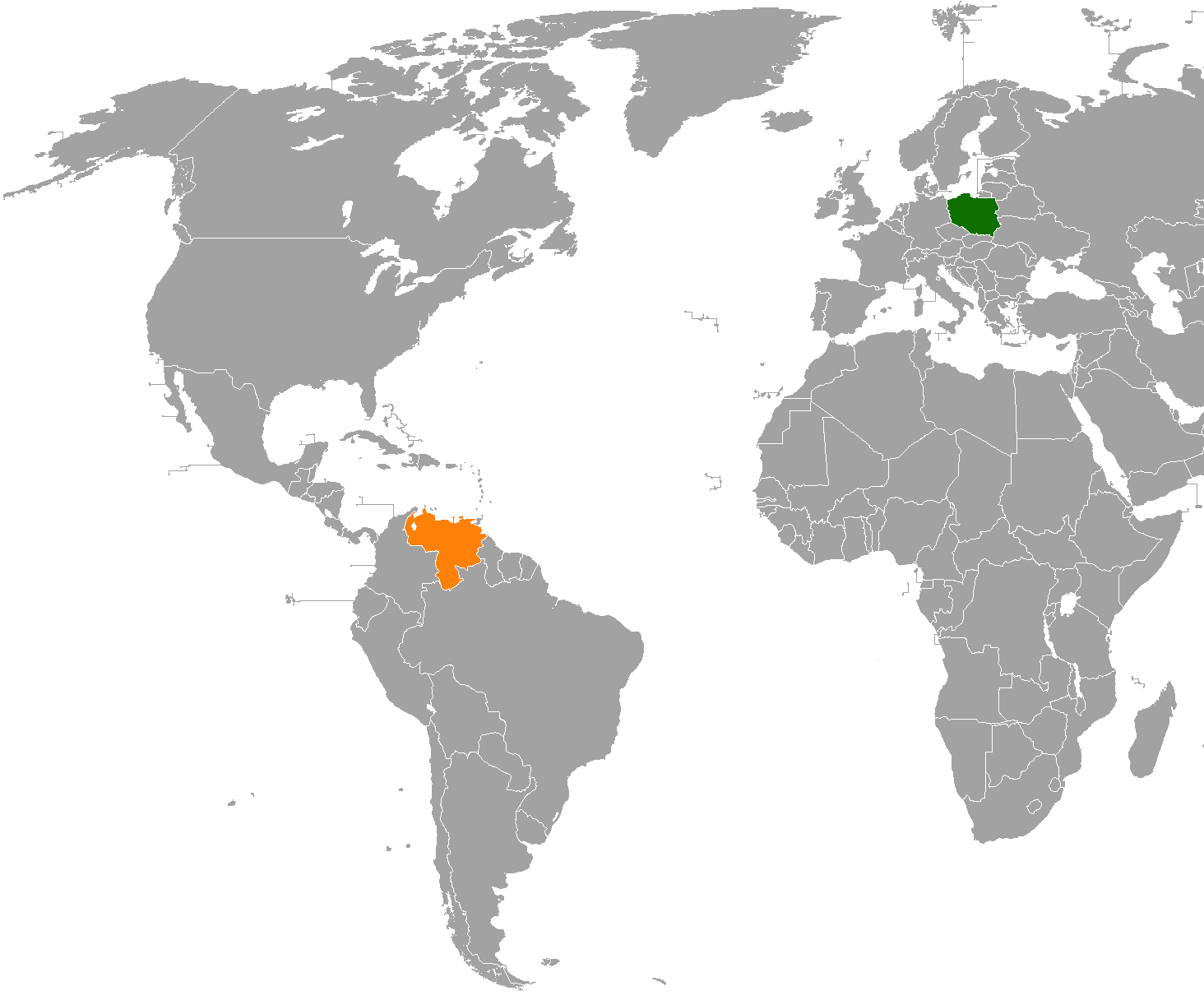
- Poland: Venezuela

Poland–Venezuela relations refers to the bilateral relations between Poland and Venezuela.

== History ==
In the 1630s, there were ideas being proposed between Duke Jacob Kettler and the King of the Polish–Lithuanian Commonwealth, John II Casimir Vasa for Polish colonization of Venezuela. Polish ships had explored settlements within the Caribbean and tried on four occasions to establish a colony on the nearby island of Tobago, however the attempt of a colony failed and all plans to establish a colony in Venezuela faltered. In 1787, Polish King Stanisław August Poniatowski hosted future Venezuelan military leader and revolutionary, Francisco de Miranda for a few days in Kaniów (in present-day Ukraine) while Miranda was traveling Europe. During the Venezuelan War of Independence, several Polish officers served and fought for Venezuelan independence against Spanish troops. One Polish officer, Izydor Borowski fought for Venezuelan independence and was promoted to general by Simón Bolívar. Soon after Venezuela obtained independence, small numbers of Poles immigrated to Venezuela, many of them scientists, clergy, architects and engineers.

In 1918, Poland re-obtained its independence after World War I. That same year, Polish Chief of State Józef Piłsudski informed all independent nations, including Venezuela, of Poland's newly obtained independence. In 1933, Poland and Venezuela officially established diplomatic relations. Initially, Poland accredited an ambassador to Venezuela from its diplomatic legation in Mexico City, Mexico from 1933 to 1942 and then from Bogotá, Colombia from 1942 to 1944. At the same time, Venezuela accredited its ambassador in Berlin, Germany to Poland. During World War II, both nations were part of the Allies, however, Venezuela did not participate militarily in the war and the Venezuelan government maintained diplomatic relations with the Polish government-in-exile resident in London. Soon after the end of the war, the Venezuelan government established relations with the Polish Provisional Government of National Unity in 1945.

Between 1947 and 1949 approximately 4,000 Poles arrived to Venezuela, many were from refugee camps in Germany and a large number of former soldiers of the Polish Armed Forces. In 1948, the first Polish organization, the Union of Poles in Venezuela, was established in Caracas. In 1952, Venezuela suspended diplomatic relations with Poland when the Polish government declared a communist system within the country. Relations were re-established in 1960. In 1980, as head of the Polish (Solidarity) Trade Union, Lech Wałęsa paid a visit to Venezuela. In 1989, Lech Wałęsa paid a second visit to Venezuela where he was bestowed the Order of Francisco de Miranda by President Carlos Andrés Pérez.

In June 2000, a Venezuelan Delegation paid an official visit to Poland and met with Polish parliamentarians and a Senator for bilateral conferences on relations between both nations. In 2003, a Polish delegation paid a visit to Venezuela. In January 2013, during the first Summit between the Community of Latin American and Caribbean States and the European Union held in Santiago, Chile; Foreign Ministers, Elías Jaua and Radosław Sikorski met and signed several bilateral cooperation agreements.

During the presidential crisis in Venezuela, Poland officially recognized Juan Guaidó as the interim president of Venezuela in February 2019. In 2025, Venezuela closed its embassy in Warsaw.

== Agreements ==
Both nations have signed several bilateral agreements, such as an Agreement on Cultural Cooperation (1973); Agreement on Scientific and Technical Cooperation (1988); Agreement to Abolish Visas for Diplomatic and Service Passport Holders (1996) and Agreements on Economic, Energy, Infrastructure, Agricultural, Touristic and Environmental Cooperation (2013).

== Trade ==
In 2014, trade between Poland and Venezuela had totaled US$117 million, however, due to the current Crisis in Venezuela, trade between both nations have significantly reduced. In 2017, trade between Poland and Venezuela totaled US$40.4 million. Poland's main exports to Venezuela include: electronic equipment, steel equipment, furniture and food (cheese and milk powder). Venezuela's main exports to Poland include: raw materials, aluminum and chemical based products. Throughout the years, the Venezuelan government has purchased several Skytruck airplanes from Poland for the Venezuelan Army.

== Resident diplomatic missions ==
- Poland has an embassy in Caracas.
- Venezuela is accredited to Poland from its embassy in Berlin, Germany.

== See also ==
- Foreign relations of Poland
- Foreign relations of Venezuela
- Couronian colonization of the Americas
- Polish Venezuelans
