= Azerbaijan–Venezuela relations =

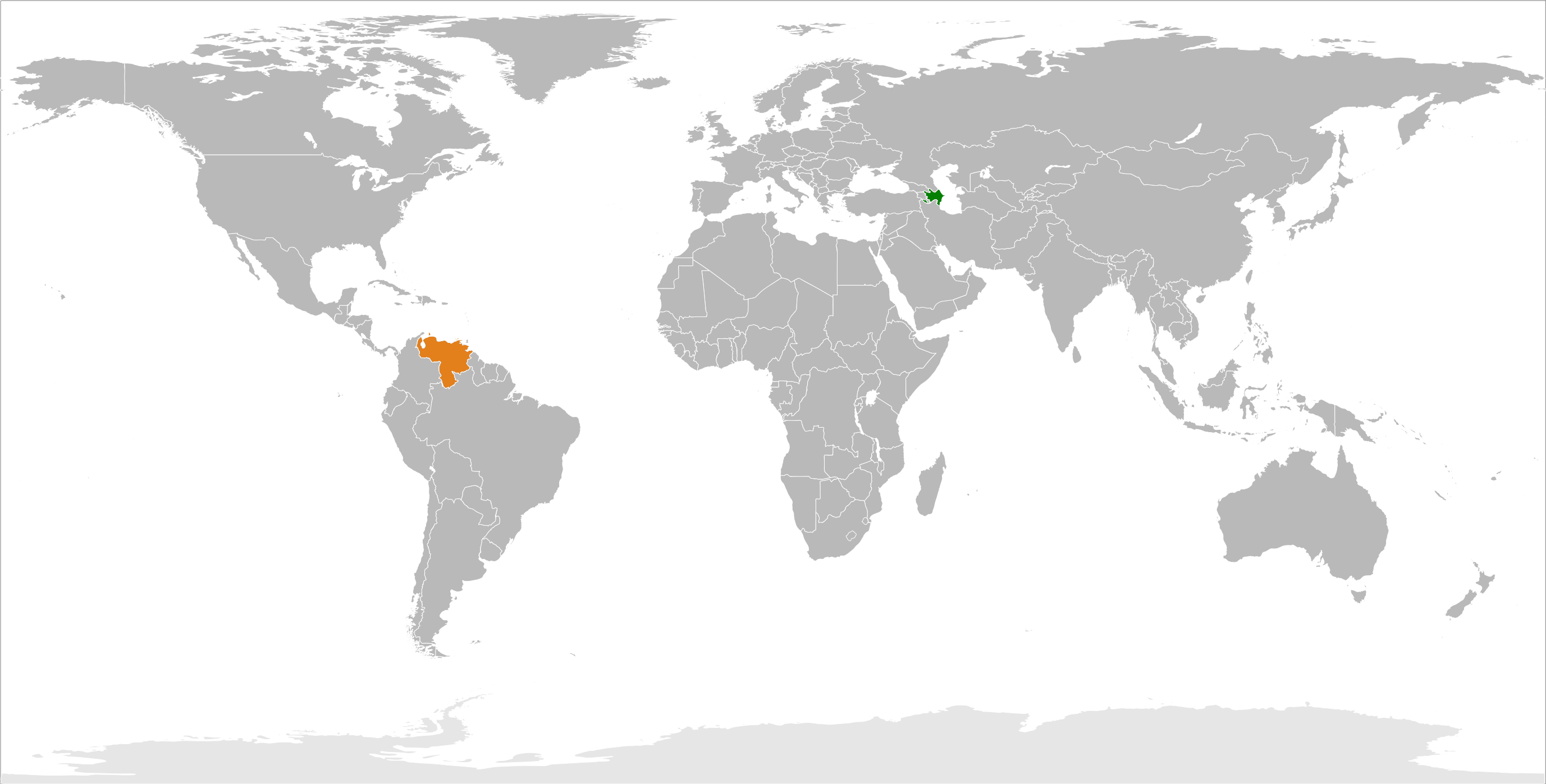

- Azerbaijan: Venezuela

Azerbaijan–Venezuela relations are the bilateral relations between Azerbaijan and Venezuela. Venezuela has an embassy in Baku. Azerbaijan is represented by its Permanent Mission to the United Nations in New York City.

The main areas of bilateral cooperation are energy, transport, science, education, environmental protection, tourism, finance, and agriculture.

== Diplomatic relations ==
Diplomatic relations between Azerbaijan and Venezuela were established for the first time on May 12, 1995.

The Venezuelan Embassy in Baku was opened in the spring of 2018. The Ambassador of Venezuela to Azerbaijan is Gabriel Leopoldo Jara Maldonado.

Legal framework: 3 agreements have been signed between Azerbaijan and Venezuela.

In October 2016, a document signing ceremony was held between the two countries. The following agreements were concluded:

1. "Joint statement of the President of the Republic of Azerbaijan and the President of the Bolivarian Republic of Venezuela".
2. "Memorandum of understanding between the Ministry of Foreign Affairs of the Republic of Azerbaijan and the Ministry of people's power for foreign Affairs of the Bolivarian Republic of Venezuela on the establishment of a mechanism for political consultations".
3. "Agreement on the exemption of diplomatic, service and service passports from visa requirements between the Government of the Republic of Azerbaijan and The government of the Bolivarian Republic of Venezuela".

== High level visits ==
On October 10, 2016, there was a meeting held between the President of Venezuela Nicolas Maduro and the President of Azerbaijan Ilham Aliyev during the 23rd World Energy Congress in Istanbul.

On October 21–22, 2016, the President of Venezuela N. Maduro made an official visit to Azerbaijan.

On September 13–18, 2016, Minister of Foreign affairs of Azerbaijan Elmar Mammadyarov paid a working visit to Venezuela to attend the next meeting of Ministers of Foreign Affairs of the countries which are members of the Non-Aligned Movement.

On April 3–6, 2018, the Minister of Foreign Affairs of Venezuela Jorge Albertu Areasa Monsera paid a working visit to Azerbaijan to attend the next meeting of the Foreign Ministers of the Non-Aligned Movement held in Baku.

During the 18th Summit of the Heads of State and Government of the Non-Aligned Movement member-states on October 25, 2019 the chairmanship in the Non-Aligned Movement passed from Venezuela to Azerbaijan. The President of Azerbaijan Ilham Aliyev was elected chairman of the summit till 2022.

== Economic cooperation ==
In 2011, the heads of oil companies in Azerbaijan, Venezuela and Belarus signed swap-deals on oil supplies in the amount of 5.0 million tons of oil per year.

== International cooperation ==
Cooperation between the two countries in the international arena is carried out within the framework of various organizations: OPEC, the UN Security Council, and the Non-Aligned Movement.

== See also ==
- Foreign relations of Azerbaijan
- Foreign relations of Venezuela
