= Myanmar–Venezuela relations =

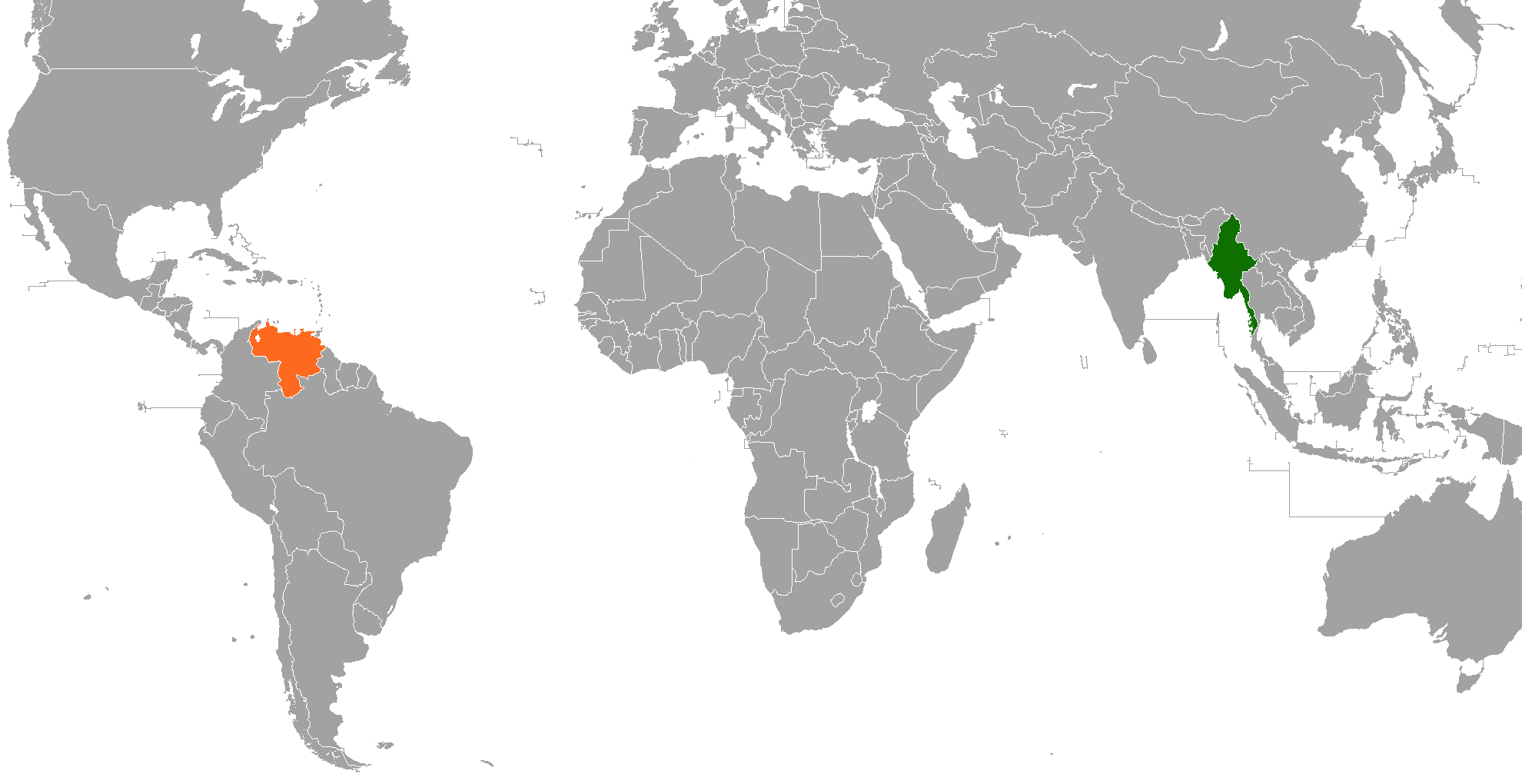
- Myanmar: Venezuela

Myanmar–Venezuela relations are the bilateral relations between Myanmar and Venezuela. Both countries currently have diplomatic relations and the ambassador of Venezuela in Vietnam is accredited to Myanmar.

== History ==
On 29 July 2019, during the Venezuelan presidential crisis, Myanmar's representation to the United Nations joined a joint statement, addressed to Secretary-General António Guterres, in support of the government of Nicolás Maduro.

== Diplomatic missions ==
Venezuela has a concurrent embassy to Myanmar in Vietnam.

== See also ==
- Foreign relations of Myanmar
- Foreign relations of Venezuela
