= Kenya–Venezuela relations =

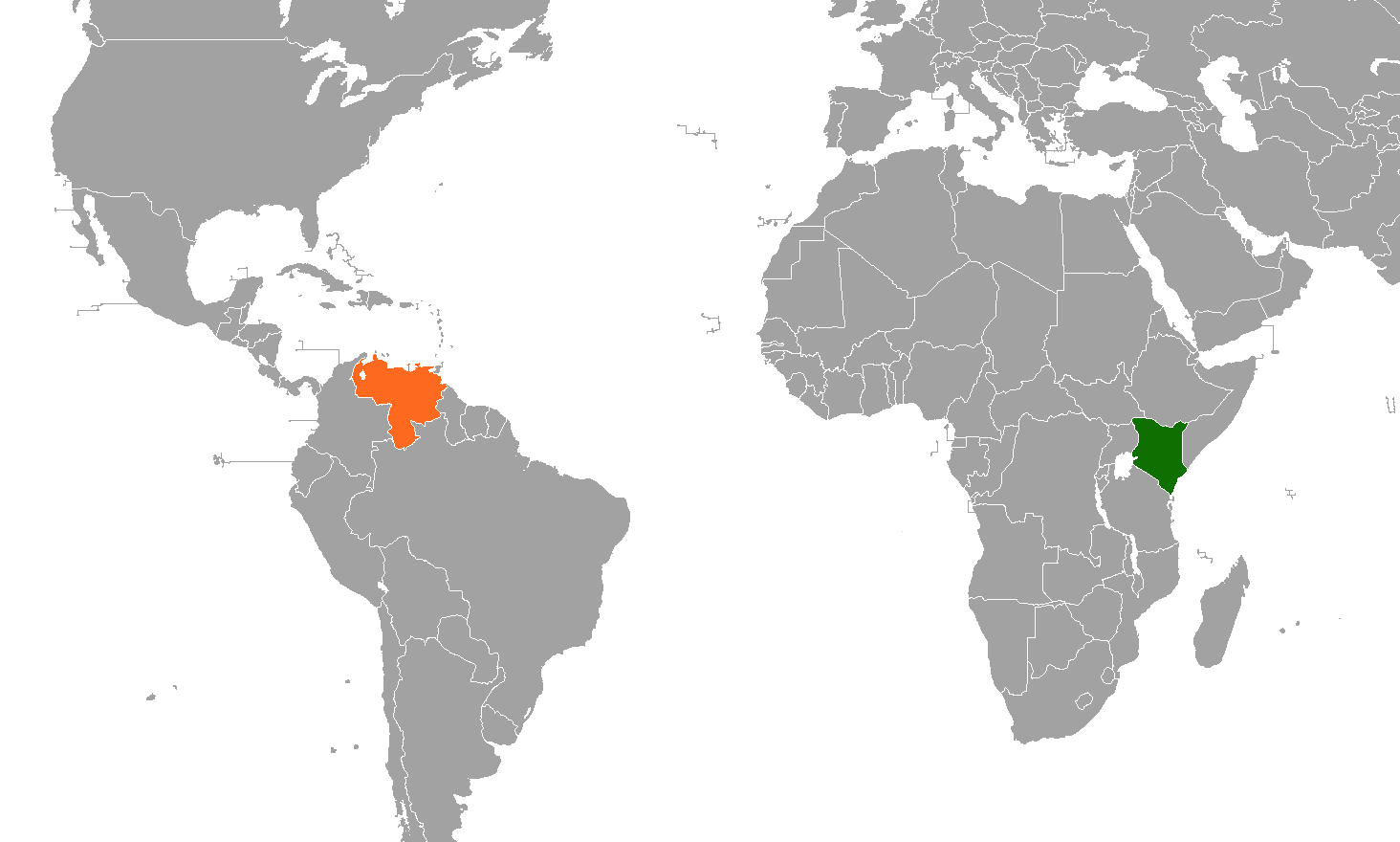
- Kenya: Venezuela

Kenya–Venezuela relations are the bilateral relations between Kenya and Venezuela. Both nations are members of the Group of 77 and the United Nations.

== History ==
In April 1970, Kenya and Venezuela established diplomatic relations. Since the establishment of diplomatic relations between both nations, relations have taken place primarily in multinational organizations such as at the United Nations.

In September 2009, Kenyan Vice President, Kalonzo Musyoka, paid a visit to Venezuela to attend the 2nd Africa-South America Summit held in Isla de Margarita. During his visit, both nations signed an Agreement for Energy Cooperation in order to promote and develop cooperation in the field of the energy and petroleum industry and cooperation in the areas of exploitation production, storage, transportation, refining and distribution of hydrocarbons.

In the past, the Venezuelan government has promoted the "Sponsor a school in Africa” initiative with the construction of primary schools in Kakamega and in Kajiado County, as well as the provision of educational materials to guarantee the success of the project and the continued cooperation. Several Kenyan students have also traveled to Venezuela for advanced educational studies at Venezuelan universities under the scholarship program of the Gran Mariscal de Ayacucho Foundation (Fundayacucho). The Venezuelan government has also promoted sustainable rice production in several Kenyan counties.

In April 2020, both nations celebrated 50 years of diplomatic relations.

== Murder of Venezuelan ambassador to Kenya ==
In 2012, acting Ambassador of Venezuela to Kenya, Olga Fonseca, was found dead at the embassy residence after two weeks. Her death was ruled to be murder. It is thought that staff at the residence had complained of sexual abuse by Fonseca's predecessor, and that Fonseca was trying to fire the staff in order to squash the internal investigation. It remains unclear of the exact motive or who was responsible for the death of Fonseca.

In January 2023, former Venezuelan diplomat, Dwight Sagaray, was found guilty of killing acting Ambassador Fonseca in 2012 by a Kenyan court. Dwight Sagaray and three Kenyan nationals were sentenced to 20 years in prison on July 14, 2023.

== Diplomatic missions ==
- Kenya is accredited to Venezuela from its embassy in Brasília, Brazil.
- Venezuela has an embassy in Nairobi.
