= North Korea–Venezuela relations =

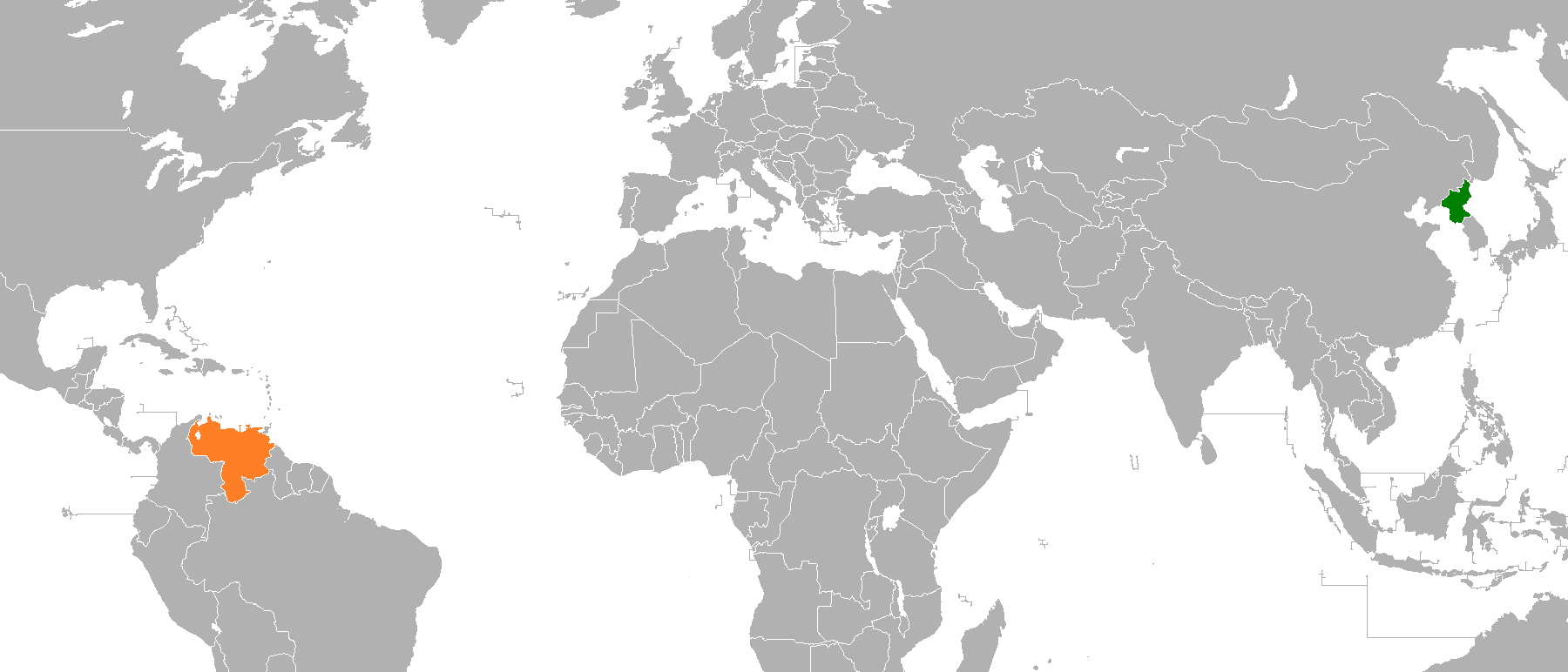

- North Korea: Venezuela

North Korea–Venezuela relations are relations between the Democratic People's Republic of Korea and the Bolivarian Republic of Venezuela. Venezuela is one of the four countries in Latin America that has an embassy of North Korea along with Brazil, Cuba and Mexico. However, Venezuela is one of the only countries in the world that has a good relationship with both North and South Korea.

Both countries established diplomatic relations in 1965 and Venezuela recognized North Korea as a sovereign state in 1974. Relations have gradually improved under the governments of Hugo Chávez and Nicolás Maduro. The two countries are both critical of the United States.

== History ==
Prior to 1974, Venezuela had recognized the South Korean government as the sole representative of the Korean peninsula.

In the 1990s, due to the severe financial crisis and the small budget of North Korea, the government was forced to close 30% of its embassies worldwide, including the North Korea embassy in Venezuela.

Venezuelan president Hugo Chávez and his North Korean counterpart Kim Jong Il evolved a friendship with Chávez in 2008 voicing an interest of visiting Pyongyang, the capital of North Korea, to meet with Kim Jong Il, although it ultimately didn't happen.

In September 2013, President Maduro declared three US diplomats persona non grata for alleged conspiracy to overthrow him, a decision that received clear support from Kim's regime. North Korean ambassador to Venezuela Jon Yong Jin congratulated President of Venezuela to take that action and rejected the "interventionist policy directed by the United States through their embassies," warning that if the US government dared to engage in a military attack on Venezuela, North Korea would assist Venezuela. Both parties then decided to create the Friendship Group of Venezuela with the Democratic People's Republic of Korea.

In October 2013, North Korea's ambassador, Jon Yong Jin, who represents North Korea as a non-resident ambassador to several countries, visited Venezuela. During his visit, Yong Jin met with deputies to the National Assembly Yul Jabour and Julio Chávez of the Communist Party of Venezuela (PCV) and the United Socialist Party of Venezuela (PSUV) respectively. Ambassador Yong Jin also took the opportunity to express his support for President Nicolás Maduro when he attended the headquarters of the Permanent Commission on Foreign Policy, Sovereignty and Integration in Caracas.

On 20 June 2014, the Venezuelan Foreign Ministry requested that North Korea reopen its embassy in the country. The North Korean embassy was re-opened a year later at La Mercedes, Caracas, as solidarity between the two countries has strengthened. The two countries also signed a bilateral agreement to build a giant statue.

On 30 November 2018, the President of the Supreme People's Assembly Kim Yong-nam, visited Venezuela to meet with President Nicolás Maduro as part of Yong-nam's tour of Latin American countries of Cuba, Mexico and Venezuela. The Korean Workers' Party newspaper Rodong Sinmun reported that Kim met with Maduro at the Miraflores Palace and signed agreements.

During the 2019 Venezuelan presidential crisis, North Korea was among the 22 countries recognizing Nicolás Maduro as the President of Venezuela. The North Korean government confirmed Ri Song-gil, the North Korean ambassador to Venezuela, met with Laura Suarez, a Venezuelan diplomat in charge of Asia, Middle East and Oceanian Affairs, according to South Korean news service Newsis. Ambassador Ri expressed that North Korea will continue to "strengthen solidarity and cooperation with socialist countries in accordance with the ideology of self-reliance, peace and good will" and to "develop relations with all nations that exhibit friendship."

On 21 August 2019, Venezuela opened an embassy in the capital of North Korea Pyongyang. During the ceremony of the opening, Venezuelan deputy foreign minister condemned US "attacks" against the Venezuelan and North Korean governments while the North Korean equivalent ensured Venezuela that North Korea would support them in the fight versus "imperialism".

== Diplomatic missions ==
- Venezuela has an embassy in Pyongyang, in operation since 2019. Previously, it was represented through its embassy in Beijing, China.
- North Korea has an embassy in Caracas, in operation since 2014.

== See also ==
- South Korea–Venezuela relations
