= Denmark–Venezuela relations =

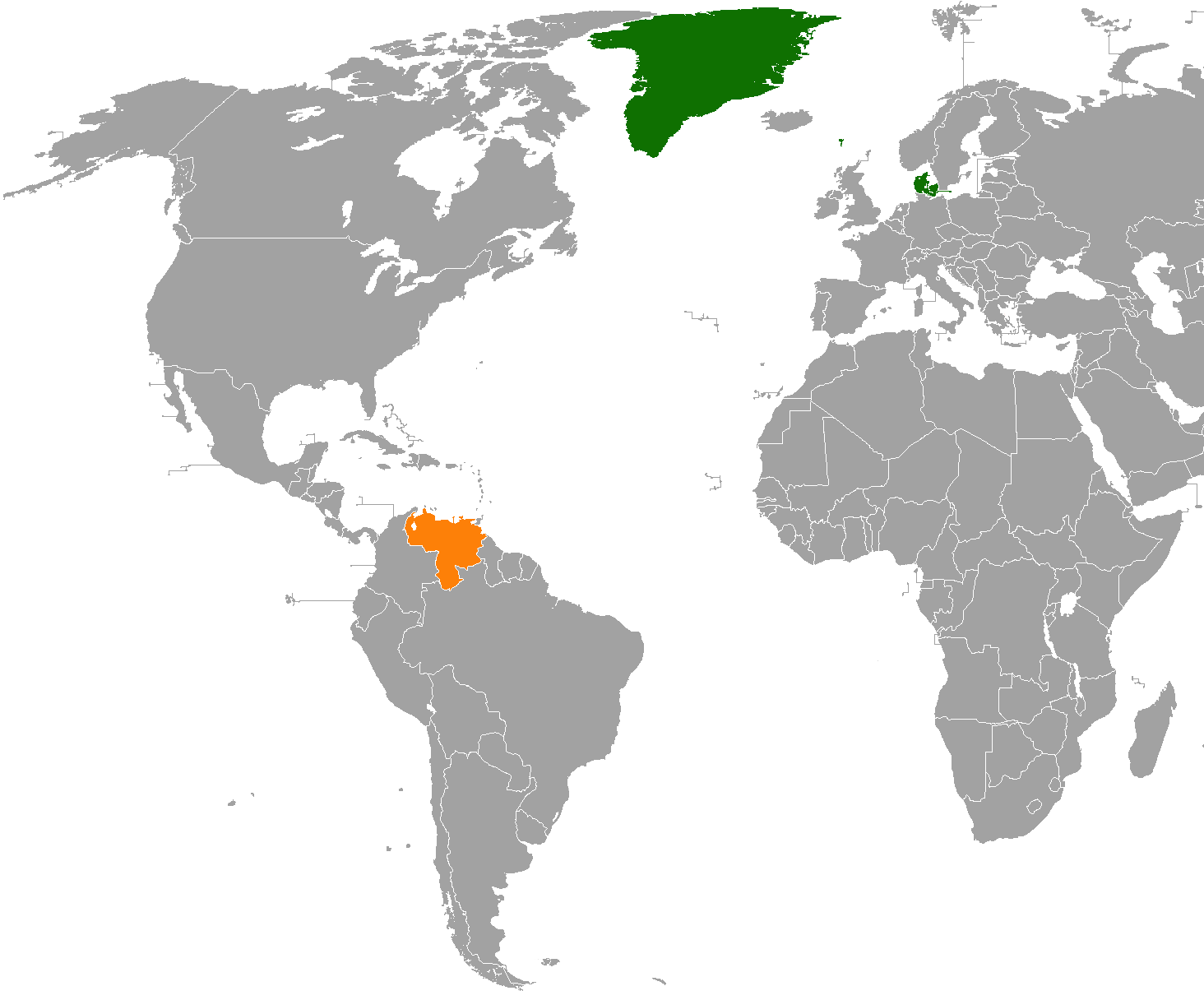
- Denmark: Venezuela

Denmark–Venezuela relations refers to the current and historical relations between Denmark and Venezuela. Denmark is accredited to Venezuela from its embassy in Brasília, Brazil. Venezuela is accredited to Denmark from its embassy in Oslo, Norway. In 1878, the relations between Denmark and Venezuela were described as "friendly".

== History ==
On March 26, 1838, Denmark and Venezuela agreed to sign a Treaty of Amity, Commerce, and Navigation. On July 18, 1858, Denmark and Venezuela signed a special treaty about customs. In 1863, a Friendship, Commerce and Navigation Treaty was signed in Caracas between Denmark and Venezuela. The treaty was described as the most liberal one for Venezuela.

In the Venezuela Crisis of 1902–1903, President of Venezuela Cipriano Castro refused to pay foreign debts and damages of citizens from various European countries following the civil wars. This refusal resulted in a blockade by Great Britain, Germany, and Italy. Although individual citizens from Denmark pressed claims, the government of Denmark refused to participate in the intervention. During the crisis American ambassador to Venezuela Herbert Wolcott Bowen transferred the defence of Venezuela to Venezuela's allies including Denmark.

During the period from 1938 to 1948, dozens of Danish families emigrated to Venezuela. On 5 June 1938, 187 Danes sailed for Venezuela.

Following the July 2024 Venezuelan presidential election, Denmark refused to recognize Nicolás Maduro as the legitimate president of Venezuela, citing a lack of transparency, electoral integrity, and democratic standards. In January 2026, following external military operations in Venezuela, Denmark reiterated its position regarding the Maduro regime while expressing concern over unilateral military action. Speaking at the United Nations Security Council, Danish Ambassador Christina Markus Lassen emphasized the necessity of strictly adhering to international law, the UN Charter, and the principles of national sovereignty and territorial integrity, calling for a Venezuelan-led, peaceful transition to democratic rule.

== Commercial relations ==
In 1831 to 1832, the total trade between Denmark and Venezuela amounted 7,876,000 francs. In 1841 to 1842, the trade reached a maximum of 1,700,000 million francs. The trade was conducted almost through the Danish colony of Saint Thomas.

In 2007, Danish export to Venezuela amounted 347 million DKK, while imports from Venezuela amounted 163 million DKK. From January to September 2008, Danish export to Venezuela amounted 304 million DKK while import from Venezuela amounted 196 million DKK.

== State visits ==
Venezuelan President Hugo Chavez visited Denmark in December 2009, for the 2009 United Nations Climate Change Conference.

== Migration ==
In 2018, Denmark provided support for venezuelan refugees and migrants.

== See also ==
- Foreign relations of Denmark
- Foreign relations of Venezuela
- Danish West India Company
