= Venezuela–Vietnam relations =

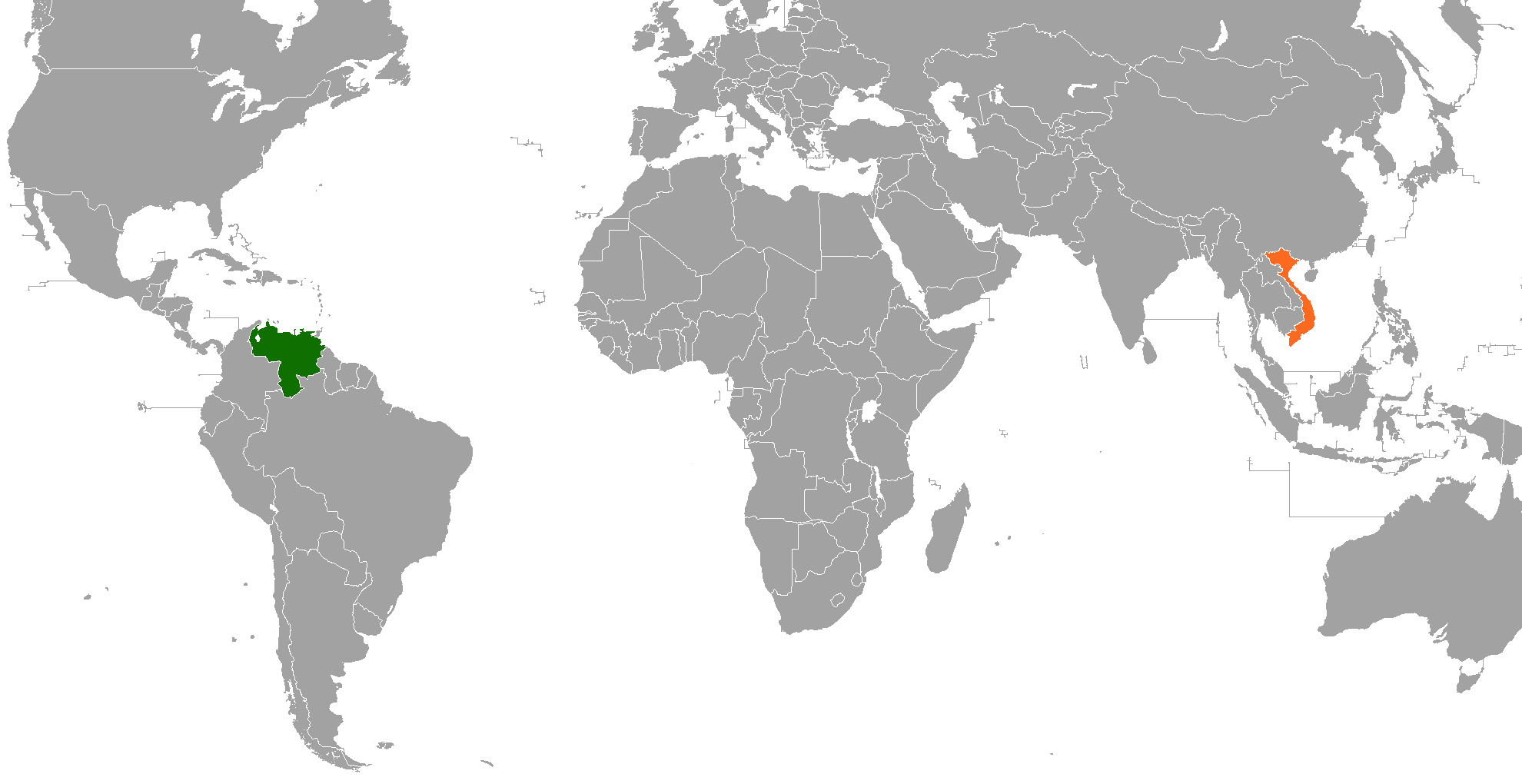
- Venezuela: Vietnam

Diplomatic mission
- Venezuela Embassy, Hanoi: Vietnam Embassy, Caracas

Venezuela and Vietnam established diplomatic links on December 8, 1989. Vietnam has an embassy in Caracas and Venezuela has an embassy in Hanoi. Though bilateral trade was US$11.7 million in 2007, relations show "great potential". Since 2008, the two countries have witnessed new developments in various fields, including politics, economics, culture and society, particularly in the oil and gas industry.

== State visits ==
Vietnamese President Nguyễn Minh Triết arrived in Caracas on 18 November 2008 for a two-day official visit on an invitation from then President Hugo Chávez. Triết hailed Vietnam's friendship with Venezuela as he sought to focus on tying up oil and gas deals, including a joint development fund. He said that, "We (Vietnamese) are grateful for the support and solidarity that they (Venezuelans) have offered us until now."

After Chavez's visit to Vietnam in 2006, his government stepped up bilateral relations with the country, which also included a visit by the Communist Party General Secretary, Nông Đức Mạnh, in 2007. Petroleos de Venezuela and PetroVietnam also announced a number of joint projects after the 2006 visit, including when PetroVietnam's was given a concession in the Orinoco basin and an agreement to transport Venezuelan oil to Vietnam, where the two would together build an oil refinery that Vietnam lacks. During his 2006 visit, Chavez praised Vietnam's revolutionary history as he attacked the United States for its "imperialist" crimes in the Vietnam War. In his the 2008 visit to Venezuela, Triết returned similar comments as he lauded a group of Venezuelans who captured a US soldier during the Vietnam war in an unsuccessful bid to prevent the execution of a Vietnamese revolutionary. The two leaders also signed a deal for a $200 million joint fund and 15 cooperation projects.

== Agreements ==
In March 2008, an agreement was signed to cooperate in tourism between Vietnam and Venezuela. President Nguyễn Minh Triết received the PDVSA's Vice President Asdrubal Chavez and stated that oil and gas cooperation would become a typical example of their multi-faceted cooperation. In 2009, the Venezuelan government approved US$46.5 million for an agricultural development project with Vietnam.

== See also ==
- Foreign relations of Venezuela
- Foreign relations of Vietnam
- Vietnamese people in Venezuela
