= Germany–Venezuela relations =

Bilateral relations

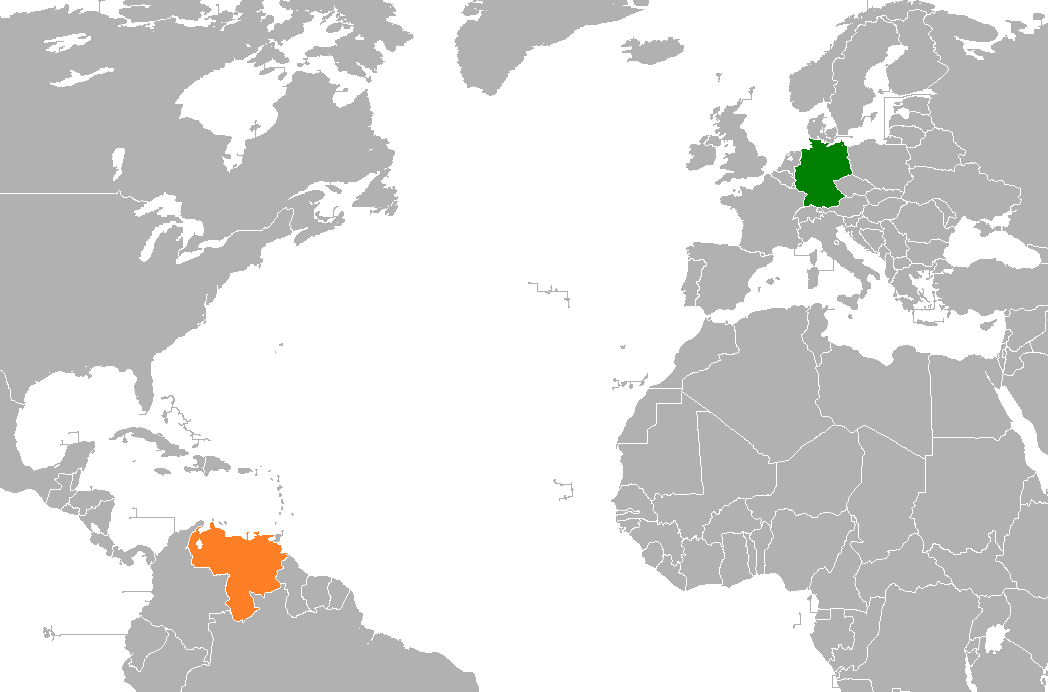

- Germany: Venezuela

Germany–Venezuela relations have a long tradition and were officially established in 1871. During Nicolás Maduro's tenure, relations have deteriorated and in 2019 Venezuela declared the German Ambassador Daniel Kriener a persona non grata; however, he was able to return to the country soon after. Close relations with Venezuela continue to be maintained by parts of the German left and the political party Die Linke.

== History ==
Germans were involved in the colonization of Venezuela as early as the 16th century. In 1528, Emperor Charles V granted governorship over the colony of Klein-Venedig (Little Venice), referring to the etymology of Venezuela being based on Venice, to the Welser family from Augsburg. Under the name Neuer Augsburg (New Augsburg), the city of Coro was founded as the capital of the territory. A year later, Ambrosius Ehinger founded the city of Maracaibo under the name of Neuer Nuremberg (New Nuremberg), although the settlement did not permanently last. In 1535, Georg Hohermuth von Speyer and Philipp von Hutten attempted to reach the mythical El Dorado from the colony. The Welsers were finally deprived of the governorship of Little Venice by the Spanish Crown in 1556 after a legal dispute.

In the 17th and 18th centuries, Jesuits from Germany may have been present in Spanish Venezuela, although sources are uncertain. In 1799, the South American voyage of Alexander von Humboldt began with his arrival in Cumaná. During the Wars of Independence in the 19th century, German officers and mercenaries fought on the side of Simón Bolívar's army for Venezuelan independence, including Johann von Uslar. The Hanseatic cities established representations in Venezuela after independence, and in the late 1820s the Lübeck Merchant Georg Blohm established a regular shipping connection between Caracas and Hamburg. German merchants, explorers, and migrants settled in the country, and in 1843 immigrants from Kaiserstuhl founded the Colonia Tovar. German immigrants established cultural and educational institutions, learned Spanish, and integrated into the majority society.

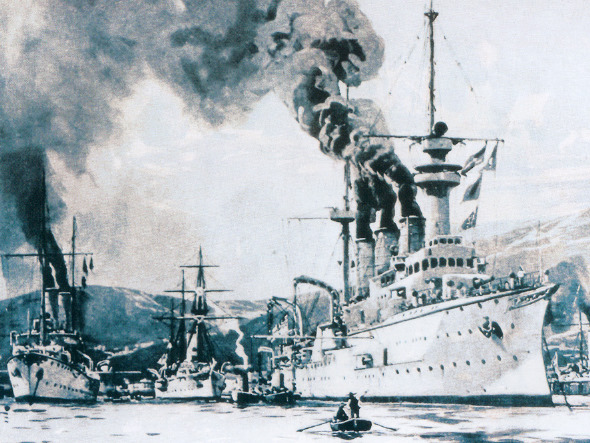
In December 1902, Germany, Britain, and Italy began blockading Venezuelan ports to force Venezuela to pay foreign debts and damages, leading to the Venezuelan crisis of 1902–1903

The North German Confederation opened a legation in Venezuela in 1868, which was converted into an embassy three years later after German Unification, and in 1893 a Venezuelan legation was established in the German Empire under Joaquín Crespo. In 1899, the German-Venezuelan Club was founded. In 1902, a diplomatic conflict arose after German citizens in Venezuela were dispossessed. As a result, British and German ships blockaded the coast of Venezuela. The dispute was settled a year later. After World War I, economic relations between the two countries deepened and Germany became one of the most important trading partners for Venezuela. During World War II, Venezuela first remained neutral and finally broke off diplomatic relations with Nazi Germany in 1941. After German U-boats disrupted shipping off Venezuela, German assets in the country were expropriated and German institutions were closed.

After World War II, diplomatic relations were re-established on April 28, 1954, between the Federal Republic of Germany (FRG) and Venezuela were established. German companies became increasingly active in the postwar period in the country, which at the time was one of the wealthiest in Latin America. A German-Venezuelan Chamber of Commerce and Industry was established soon after. After the end of the Hallstein Doctrine, Venezuela also established diplomatic relations with the German Democratic Republic (GDR). After the German Reunification, Bundespresident Roman Herzog visited Venezuela in 1996. Hugo Chávez became president of Venezuela in 1999 and adopted an anti-Western course in foreign policy. He made German sociologist Bernard Mommer his deputy minister in the Ministry of Energy and Petroleum in 2005.

In 2008, Chavez attacked German Chancellor Angela Merkel, calling her part of the German right "that supported Hitler". Martin Schulz then called Chávez a "political scatterbrain." After Chavez's death in 2013, his successor Nicolás Maduro ruled in an increasingly authoritarian manner, which further deteriorated relations with Germany. In 2019, following mass protests in Venezuela, Germany joined other Western countries in recognizing opposition politician Juan Guaidó as the country's interim president while at the same time the foreign policy spokesman of the Die Linke party, Andrej Hunko, met President Maduro in Caracas on a "state visit" and expressed solidarity with him, which was met with criticism in Germany. However, after the protests in Venezuela subsided, the recognition of Guaidó as president of Venezuela was reversed by the German government in 2021.

In January 2026, German Chancellor Friedrich Merz condemned Venezuelan President Nicolás Maduro following the U.S. military raid on Caracas. He reaffirmed that Germany does not recognize Maduro's presidency, characterizing the most recent Venezuelan elections as "rigged".

== Economic relations ==
There is an investment promotion treaty and a double taxation agreement between the two countries. However, with the severe economic crisis in Venezuela starting in 2013, economic contacts have collapsed and many German companies have withdrawn from the country. In 2016, direct flights between Caracas and Frankfurt am Main were discontinued. Bilateral trade volume in 2021 was only 93 million euros, a fraction of that with neighboring Colombia (2.6 billion euros).

== Cultural relations ==
There are numerous cultural contacts between the two countries. German institutions active in the country include the Goethe-Institut, the Asociación Cultural Humboldt, and the evangelical and the Roman-Catholic Church in Germany. With the Colegio Humboldt Caracas there is a German school abroad in the country.

== Migration ==
Since the 16th century, German migration to Venezuela occurred and Germans founded cities such as Coro, Maracaibo and Colonia Tovar. The latter settlement shows a strong German cultural imprint until the 21st century.

In 2018, just under 6000 Venezuelans lived in Germany. Nearly six million Venezuelans fled their homeland under the Maduro government as part of the economic crisis in the country, with nearly 10,000 of them settling in Germany by 2020.

== Diplomatic locations ==
- Germany has an embassy in Caracas.
- Venezuela has an embassy in Berlin and a consulate general in Frankfurt am Main.

== See also ==
- Foreign relations of Germany
- Foreign relations of Venezuela
