= Brazil–Venezuela relations =

- Brazil: Venezuela

Brazil and Venezuela maintain diplomatic relations. Brazil has an embassy in Caracas and Venezuela has an embassy in Brasília and a consulate-general in São Paulo.

== History ==
=== 2000–2010 ===
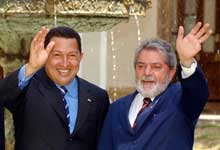
Brazilian president Luiz Inácio Lula da Silva (right) and Venezuelan President Hugo Chavez, 2005

In 2001, Venezuela and Brazil opened a high-voltage power line between the two countries to supply electricity from Venezuela to energy-starved northern Brazil. The line provides cheap hydro-electric power to Brazil and also earns Venezuela tens of millions of dollars every year.

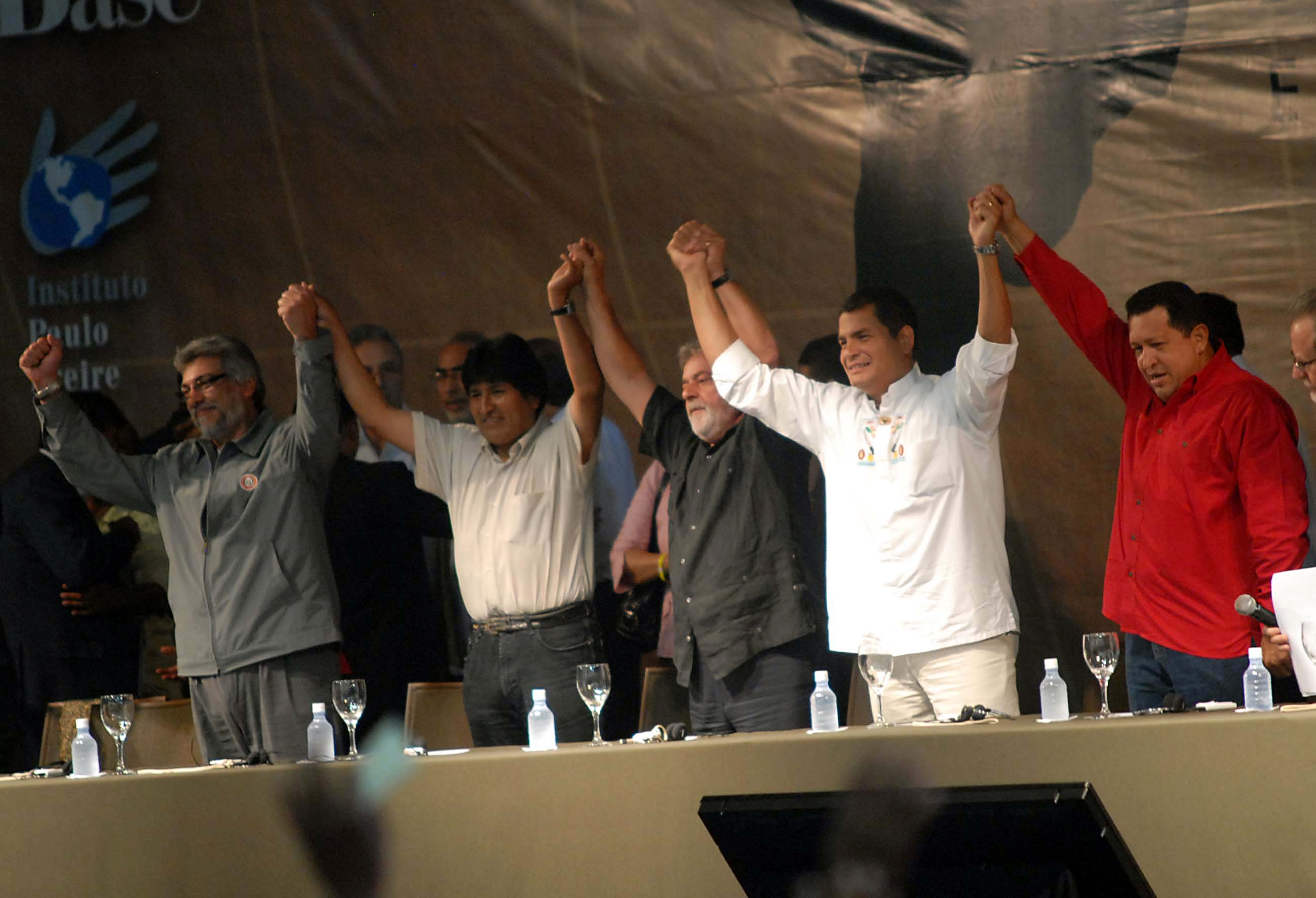
Meeting of South American Presidents in Brazil in 2009. Lula of Brazil is in the center, and Chávez of Venezuela furthest right.

In 2007, Brazil and Venezuela pledged closer trade and energy ties, including building a new oil refinery in Brazil. The $4.5bn refinery scheme to be completed in 2010 will be 40% owned by Venezuela's state oil firm PDVSA, while Brazil's national oil firm Petrobras will hold the rest.

Brazil's president Lula was close with Venezuela's president Hugo Chávez. In November 2007, Lula defended Chávez as the democratic choice of his people. He said: "There is no risk with Chávez." Expressing his admiration for Chávez, he said "Only thanks to Chávez's leadership, the people [of Venezuela] have had extraordinary achievements," and that in 2008 that Chávez was "the best president the country has had in 100 years." Brazilians had a different view than Lula in 2010, however, as only 13% had at least some confidence in Chávez, while seven-in-ten had little or no confidence in him.

Venezuela purchased 1,500 tonnes of coffee beans from Brazil on 10 August 2009 after falling out with Colombia over its decision to allow an increased United States presence in its military bases.

=== 2010–2020 ===
On 18 June 2015, a mission of Brazilian senators led by Sen. Aécio Neves (mostly composed by opposition legislatives to Pres. Dilma Rousseff) flew to Caracas with an interest to visit Venezuelan prisoner Leopoldo López and families of victims of the protests against President Nicolás Maduro. About a kilometer away from the Simón Bolívar International Airport, the vehicle carrying the senators was prevented from continuing the trip after being stopped and surrounded by government protesters. Finally, the Brazilian senators decided to return to Brazil on the same day. The legislative houses Câmara dos Deputados and Senado Federal of Brazil issued motions of rejection to such events. The Ministry of Foreign Affairs of Brazil issued an Official Note expressing his annoyance with the "unacceptable hostile acts" that occurred that day and asking for official explanations from the Government of Venezuela.

During the Brazilian government of President Jair Bolsonaro from 2019 to 2022, Brazil cut off the relations with the current Venezuelan government of president Nicolás Maduro. Brazil downgraded its diplomatic relations with the ruling Venezuelan government. In the Venezuelan presidential crisis, Brazil has recognised Venezuelan opposition leader Juan Guaidó as the legitimate President of Venezuela. In April 2020, Brazil closed its embassy in Venezuela.

=== 2020–2022 ===
Brazil–Venezuela relations featured as a significant issue in the 2022 Brazilian general election. Far-right incumbent Jair Bolsonaro, his surrogates and supporters repeatedly sought to undermine the campaign of leftist challenger ex-President Lula by making a series of claims that Lula had a desire to "turn Brazil into Venezuela", that under Lula's previous administrations, he had financed Venezuelan infrastructure development through the Brazilian National Development Bank (BNDES) at the expense of Brazilian infrastructure development, and that Lula was "in love" with "Maduro and other dictators". Meanwhile, Bolsonaro was accused of paedophilia and perversion by his opponents for a podcast in which he recalled a meeting he had with underaged girls … all Venezuelans' in São Sebastião, stating that he "felt a spark". Bolsonaro later apologised for his remarks.

Following Bolsonaro's defeat in Brazil's presidential runoff, Venezuelan President Nicolás Maduro congratulated Lula and reported the resumption of a "binational cooperation agenda between our countries" following a telephone conversation with the President-elect. On December 14, Brazil's incoming Minister of Foreign Relations Mauro Vieira stated that Lula had instructed him to re-establish relations with Venezuela.

=== 2023 ===
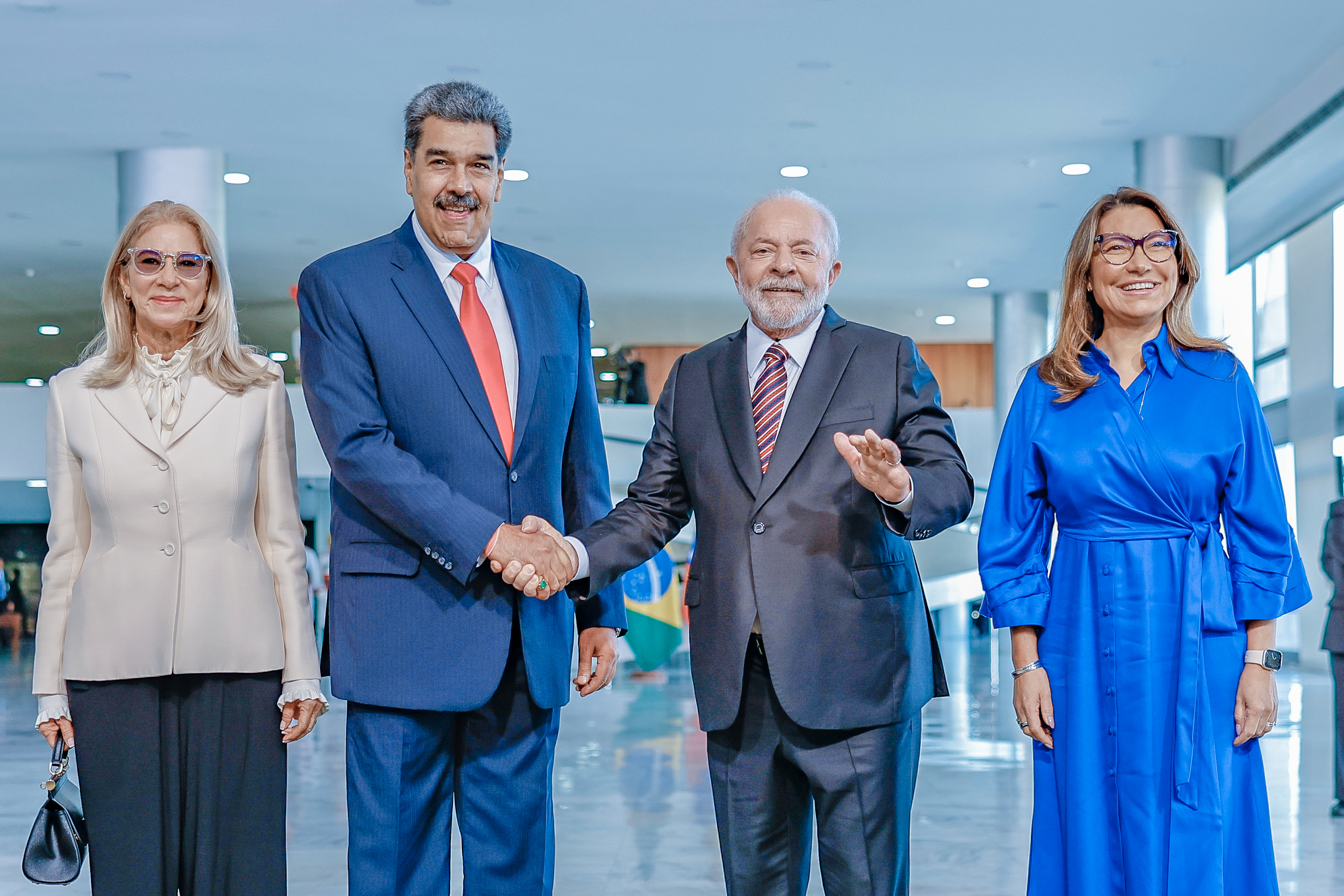
Nicolás Maduro visit to Brazil, May 2023

Incoming foreign Minister of Brazil Mauro Vieira noted that from day one of the new administration, January 1, 2023, a chargé d’affaires would be sent to Venezuela to retake diplomatic buildings owned by Brazil, and to re-open the Brazilian embassy in Caracas. When questioned over the status of Juan Guaidó, Vieira, Brazil said it would "recognise the government of President Nicolás Maduro", but at the same time, would be willing to maintain contact with the Venezuelan opposition' In recognition of such comments, Guaido’s unofficial ambassador to Brazil, Maria Teresa Belandria, has initiated plans to exit Brazil before Lula’s inauguration. Meanwhile, Vieira confirmed previous reports that contact has been made with the government to reverse its travel ban on Venezuelan officials to allow Maduro to attend Brazil president Lula's inauguration.

Later that month, Vieira confirmed resumption of diplomatic relations between the two largest South American nations after severing them in 2020. In December of the previous year, Maduro already established Manuel Vicente Vadell as his country’s ambassador to Brazil. Meanwhile, attachés from both countries were evaluating the condition of the diplomatic missions in the respective capitals. The Brazilian government equally confirmed Manuel Vicente Vadeel Aquino as the Venezuelan ambassador to Brazil. According to the Brazilian Foreign Ministry, economic ties particularly for petroleum and manufactured goods should also increase but the suspension of Venezuela from Mercosur in 2017 was hindering further economic ties.

In March 2023, Lula refused to join 54 other nations and sign a United Nations declaration criticizing Venezuela's human rights abuses. In May 2023 Lula met with Maduro in Brazil. In May 2023, Lula warmly embraced and fully supported Venezuela's President Maduro. Lula dismissed charges against Maduro of human rights and civil rights abuses as a political "constructed narrative". Lula was criticized by Uruguay’s President Luis Lacalle Pou, who said that the "worst thing we can do" is pretend there are no significant human rights problems in Venezuela, and by Chile’s President Gabriel Boric, who said that Lula was making light of human rights violations in Venezuela. Lula also criticized as "unjustified" U.S. sanctions on Venezuela for its alleged human rights abuses, and criticized the United States for denying the legitimacy of Maduro, who the U.S. said had not allowed free elections.

=== 2024 ===
The 2024 Venezuelan presidential election, marked by claims of fraud and a disputed victory for incumbent Nicolás Maduro, significantly strained Venezuela-Brazil relations. Brazilian President Luiz Inácio Lula da Silva, traditionally an ally of Maduro, expressed concerns over the election's transparency, calling for detailed voting data to ensure legitimacy. Tensions rose when Venezuela expelled diplomats from Argentina and Peru, with Brazil stepping in to represent their interests in Caracas. By October, Venezuela recalled its ambassador from Brazil over alleged "interventionist" statements, to which Brazil responded with surprise at Venezuela's "offensive tone." The diplomatic rift impacted regional dynamics, as Brazil blocked Venezuela’s bid to join BRICS, highlighting the growing strain in relations between the two nations.
