= South Korea–Venezuela relations =

- South Korea: Venezuela

South Korea–Venezuela relations are the bilateral relations between South Korea and Venezuela. South Korea has an embassy in Caracas and Venezuela has an embassy in Seoul.

== History ==
South Korea and Venezuela established diplomatic relations on 29 April 1965.

== See also ==
- Foreign relations of South Korea
- Foreign relations of Venezuela
