= Olga Fonseca =

Venezuelan diplomat

- Born: Olga Arelis Fonseca Giménez c. 1955
- Died: 27 July 2012
- Occupation: Diplomat

Olga Arelis Fonseca Giménez (c. 1955-27 July 2012) was a Venezuelan diplomat. Fonseca worked in the Venezuelan foreign ministry and served as the country's ambassador to Kenya in 2012 until the date of her assassination.
