= Netherlands–Venezuela relations =

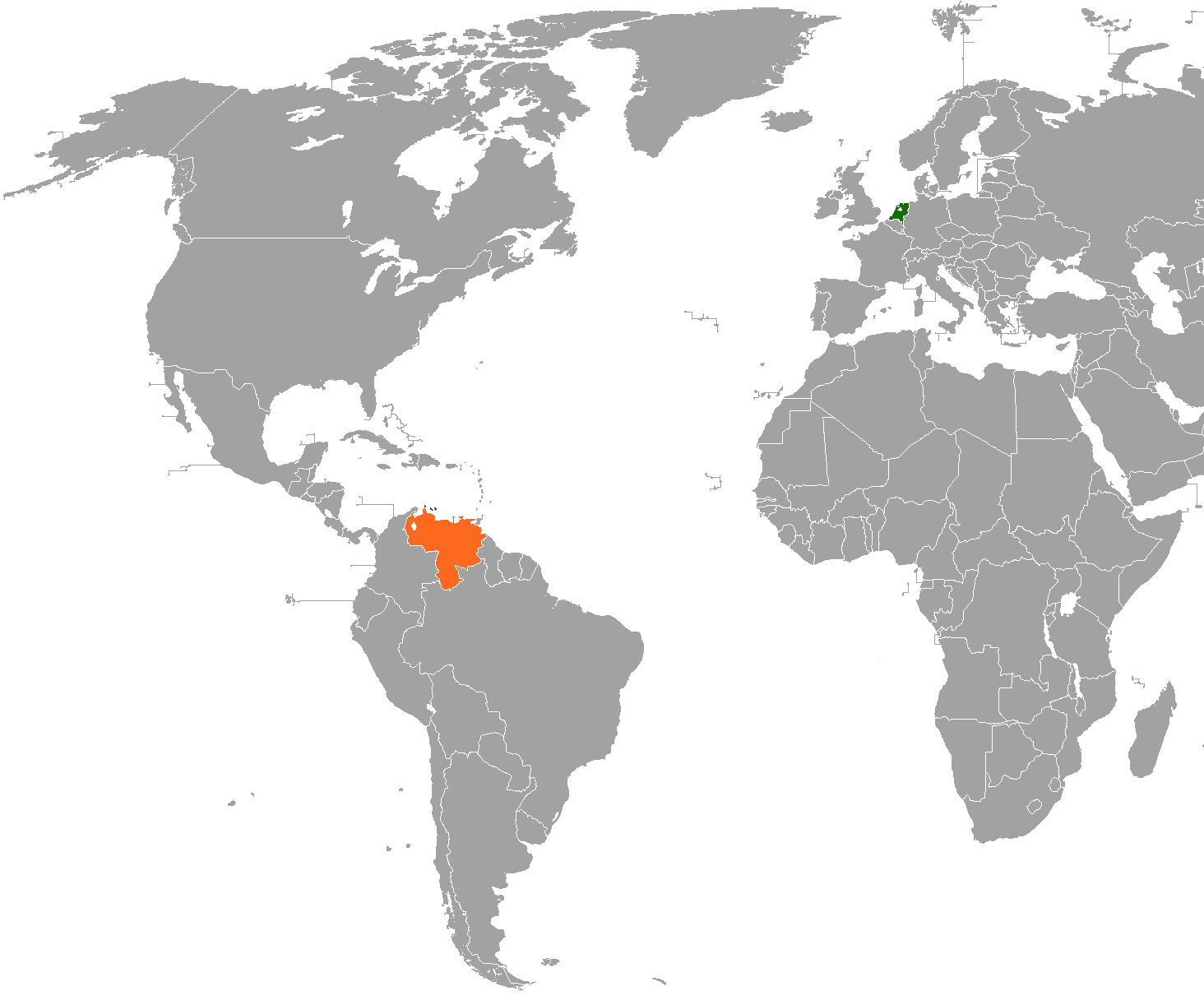
- Netherlands: Venezuela

Netherlands–Venezuelan relations are the bilateral relations between the Netherlands and Venezuela.

== History ==
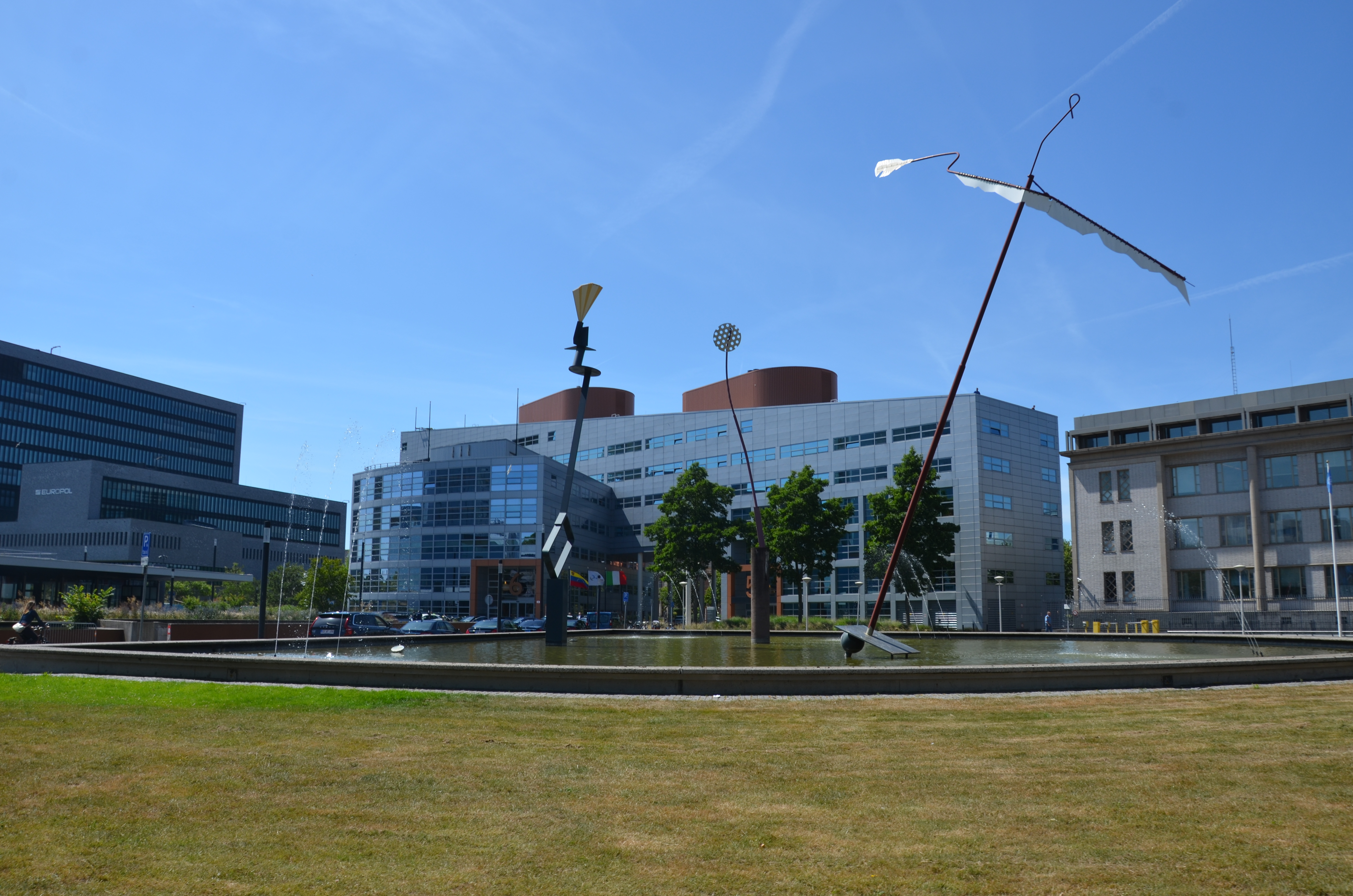
Embassy of Venezuela in The Hague

Diplomatic relations between the governments of the Netherlands and Venezuela were established in 1921 following a treaty to that effect concluded at Caracas on 11 May 1920. Relations between the two governments were strained, since the Venezuelan navy seized some Dutch ships during the First World War –even though the Dutch government remained neutral– and in that treaty, the Venezuelan government agreed to pay the Dutch government 20,000 Bolivars as indemnity for seizure of those ships.

The ABC Islands, all dependencies of the Kingdom of the Netherlands lie less than 15 miles (24 km) off Venezuela's shores. The most populous of these territories are the island is Curaçao, whose demographics are not like that of Venezuela and much of South America. Chávez called for "revolutionary independence" for these Islands, a proposition that has disturbed many islanders and high-ranking Dutch military officials in The Hague. This, combined with Chávez's recent alliances with nations hostile to the Western world, prompted the Dutch government to position Dutch naval equipment on several unpopulated islands near Venezuela.

In January 2010, the Dutch Prime Minister Jan Peter Balkenende dismissed the allegations of Chávez that US war planes were being deployed as part of a planned attack during a television interview, showing a photograph of a US P3 warplane as proof. According to Balkenende, the planes were being used to combat drug trafficking and the picture had been "taken from Wikipedia" and was dated from 2002.

In 2019, recently arrived Venezuelan refugees in Aruba were estimated to number around 17,000, accounting for some 15% of the island’s population.

== See also ==
- Foreign relations of the Netherlands
- Foreign relations of Venezuela
