= Libya–Venezuela relations =

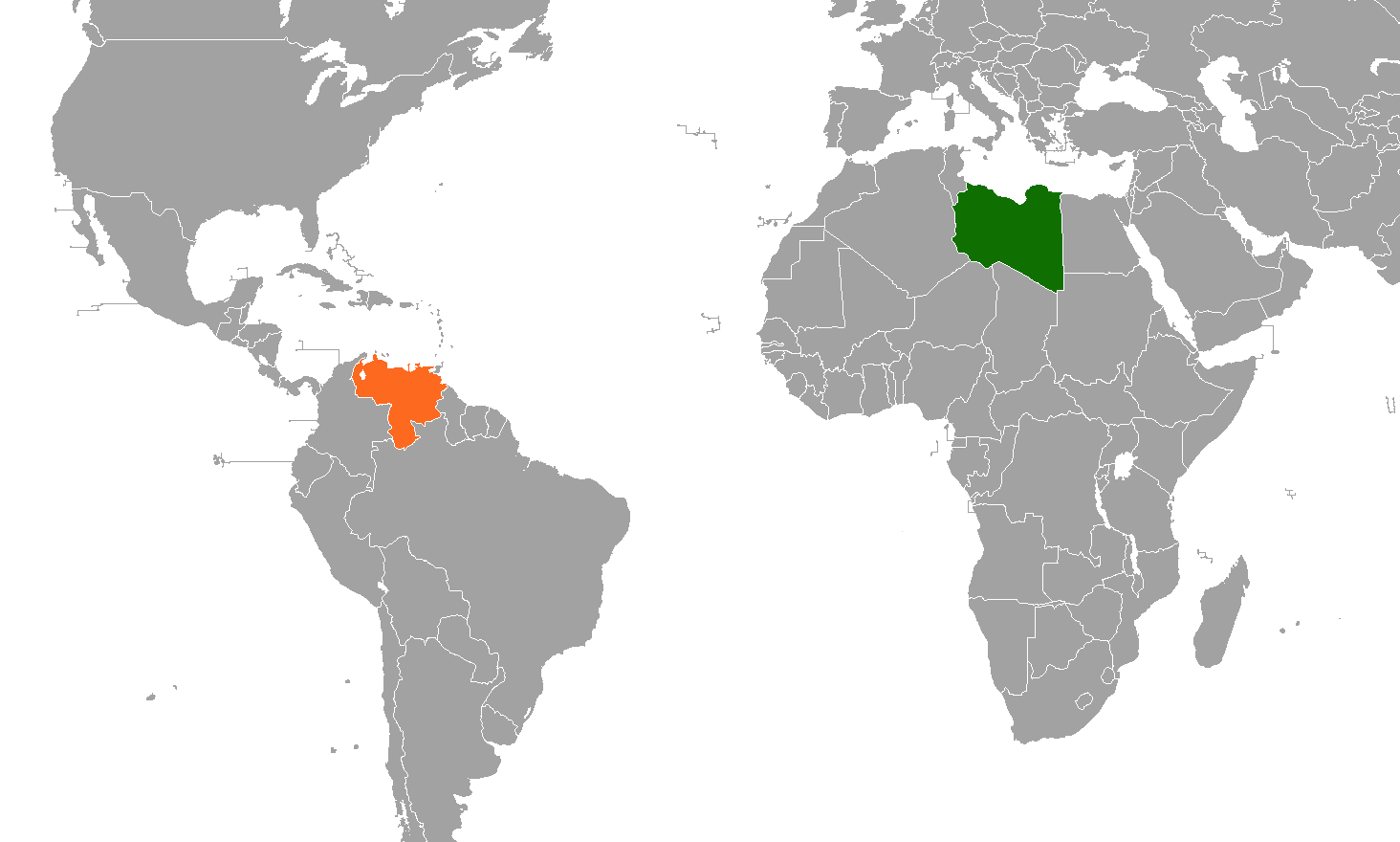

- Libya: Venezuela

Libya–Venezuela relations refer to bilateral relations that between Libya and Venezuela. Both countries are members of the United Nations and the Organization of Petroleum Exporting Countries (OPEC).

== History ==
President Hugo Chávez's first trip to Libya occurred in 2001 after a personal invitation he received in 1999 from Muammar Gaddafi. During this short visit, they discussed the international situation, declining oil prices, and OPEC production levels. Felipe Mujica, leader of the opposition party MAS, accused Chávez of not reporting his trip to Libya and hiding it under a tour of Europe and Africa. In 2004, Muammar al-Gaddafi awarded Chávez in the city of Tripoli the "Al-Gaddafi International Prize for Human Rights" and Chávez called him a "friend and brother", affirming they "shared the same social view". In 2006, during Chávez's third visit, the leaders signed a general treaty of economical and cultural cooperation, and Chávez called for a mutual union against "American hegemony". Venezuela's former ambassador to Libya, Julio César Pineda, said in 2003 that Chávez was "coordinating an anti-American strategy with terrorist states" following his visit to Libya. Libya had been moving to repair ties with the United States (by offering compensations for the Lockerbie bombing, etc.) at the time that Chávez was setting himself up as South America's leading opponent of the Bush administration.

== During Libyan Civil War ==
Since the 2011 Libyan Civil War, Chávez was outspoken in support of Gaddafi and offered to broker talks between him and the opposition. Following Gaddafi's death, Chávez said in a statement "We shall remember Gaddafi our whole lives as a great fighter, a revolutionary and a martyr. They assassinated him. It is another outrage." During the war in Libya of 2011, the Venezuelan president Hugo Chávez denounced what for the president was a double standard of the international community, rejected foreign interference in Libya and said that no one was able to condemn the actions of Muammar Gaddafi. His chancellor Nicolás Maduro criticized the international treatment of the crisis, declaring that the press was "favorable to Gaddafi's opponents" and "to the interests of West".

Chávez suggested an initiative to create an international commission to seek a negotiated and peaceful solution to Libya's internal conflict that does not include the departure of power from Gaddafi. In the context of the Meeting of Foreign Ministers of the ALBA, the foreign ministers of Bolivia, David Choquehuanca, Ecuador, Ricardo Patiño, of Cuba, Bruno Rodríguez, and the Deputy Minister of Economic Relations and External Cooperation of the Ministry of Foreign Affairs of Nicaragua, Subsequently, Chávez referred to Gaddafi as a "martyr".

== Resident diplomatic missions ==
- Libya has an embassy in Caracas.
- Venezuela is accredited to Libya from its embassy in Algiers.
