= Solomon Islands–Venezuela relations =

Solomon Islander-Venezuelan relations
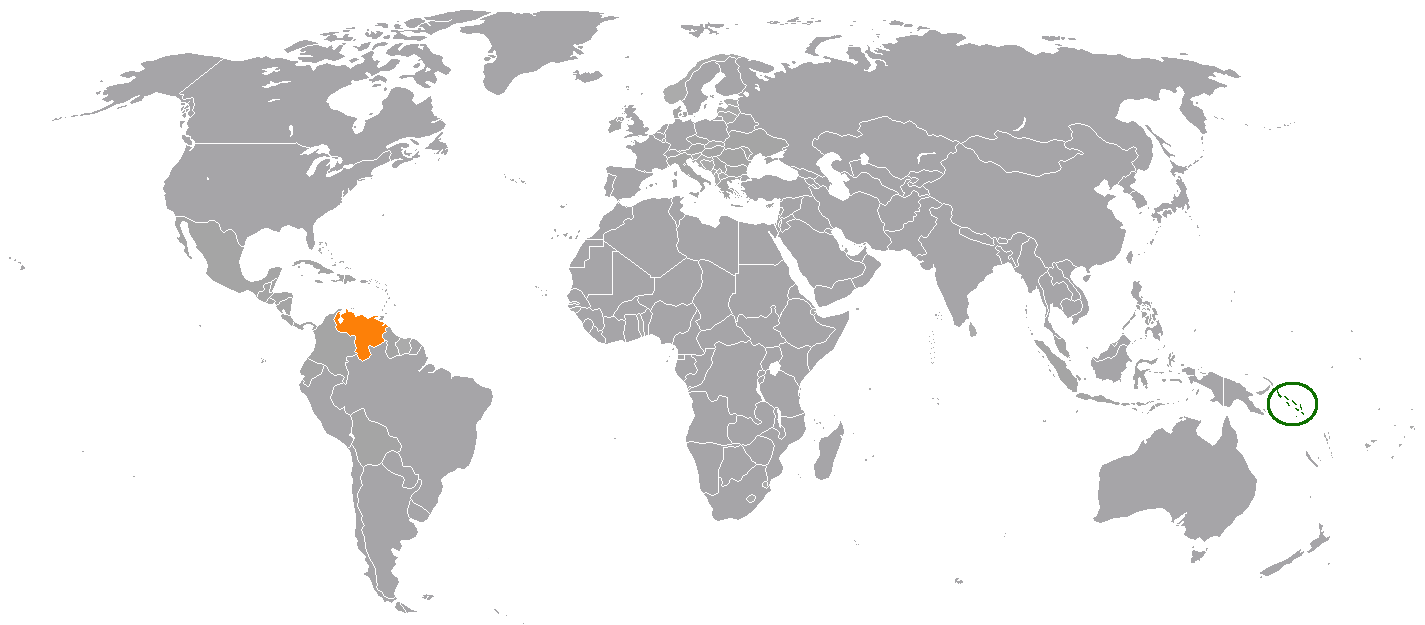

- Solomon Islands: Venezuela

Solomon Islands–Venezuela relations are the diplomatic relations between Solomon Islands and Venezuela.

== History ==
In October 2008, during the 2008 financial crisis, Solomons Prime Minister Derek Sikua moved to establish economic relations with Venezuela, hoping to benefit from comparatively cheap Venezuelan oil. It was believed that it would bring down the price of oil for Solomon Islanders, and boost the economy if the Solomons imported crude Venezuelan oil, refined it and then exported it to neighbouring countries.
