= Holy See–Venezuela relations =

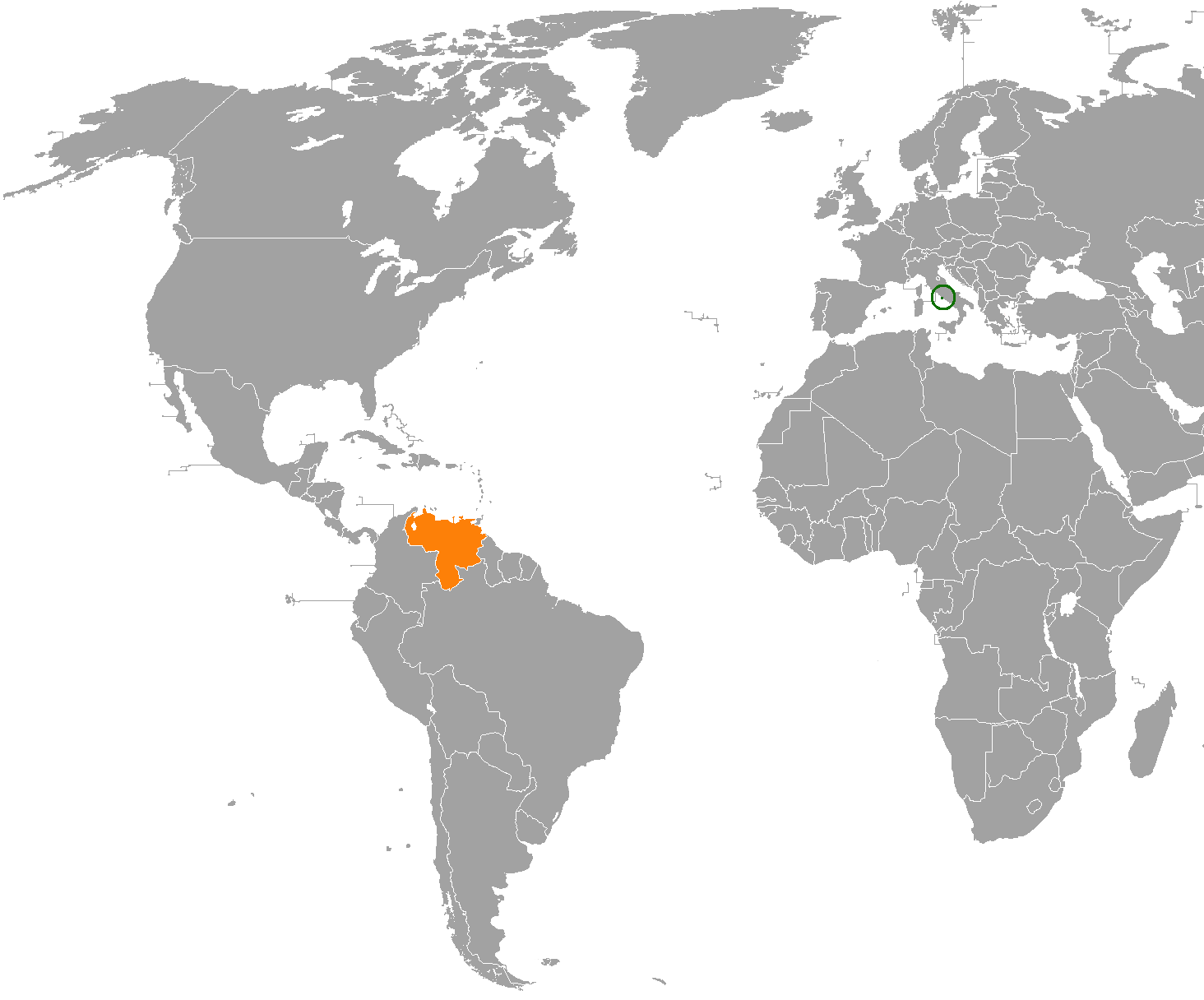
- Holy See: Venezuela

Holy See–Venezuela relations are foreign relations between the Holy See and Venezuela. Both countries established diplomatic relations in 1869. The Holy See has a nunciature in Caracas. Venezuela has an embassy in Rome.

== Relations under the Chávez and Maduro presidencies ==
There have been tensions with the Vatican under the presidency of Hugo Chávez, a president who while being Catholic is ideologically influenced by Karl Marx and Vladimir Lenin, political thinkers that have historically been opposed to the influence of the Roman Catholic Church. Chávez has also been known to cite proponents of liberation theology such as Leonardo Boff, whose ideas Rome had opposed in the 1980s and 1990s.

In 2009, pro-government colectivos tear-gassed the Holy See's envoy after Chávez accused the Roman Catholic Church of interfering with his government.

Relations between the Vatican and Nicolás Maduro, Chávez's successor, have also remained tense, with the Venezuelan leader sharply critiquing, among others, a letter sent by the Vatican to foreign businesses. While Cardinal Baltazar Enrique Porras Cardozo did raise the possibility in June 2021 that the Holy See mediate between the two sides in the Venezuelan political crisis, such mediation has not yet taken place, as of late 2023.

== Recent developments ==
In August 2024, the Holy See's permanent observer to the Organization of American States supported the Venezuelan bishops' call for electoral transparency and called for dialogue and peaceful conduct after the presidential election. In January 2026, Pope Leo XIV called for respect for Venezuela's sovereignty and rule of law following the capture of Nicolás Maduro by U.S. forces.

== See also ==
- Apostolic Nuncio to Venezuela
