= Demographics of Venezuela =

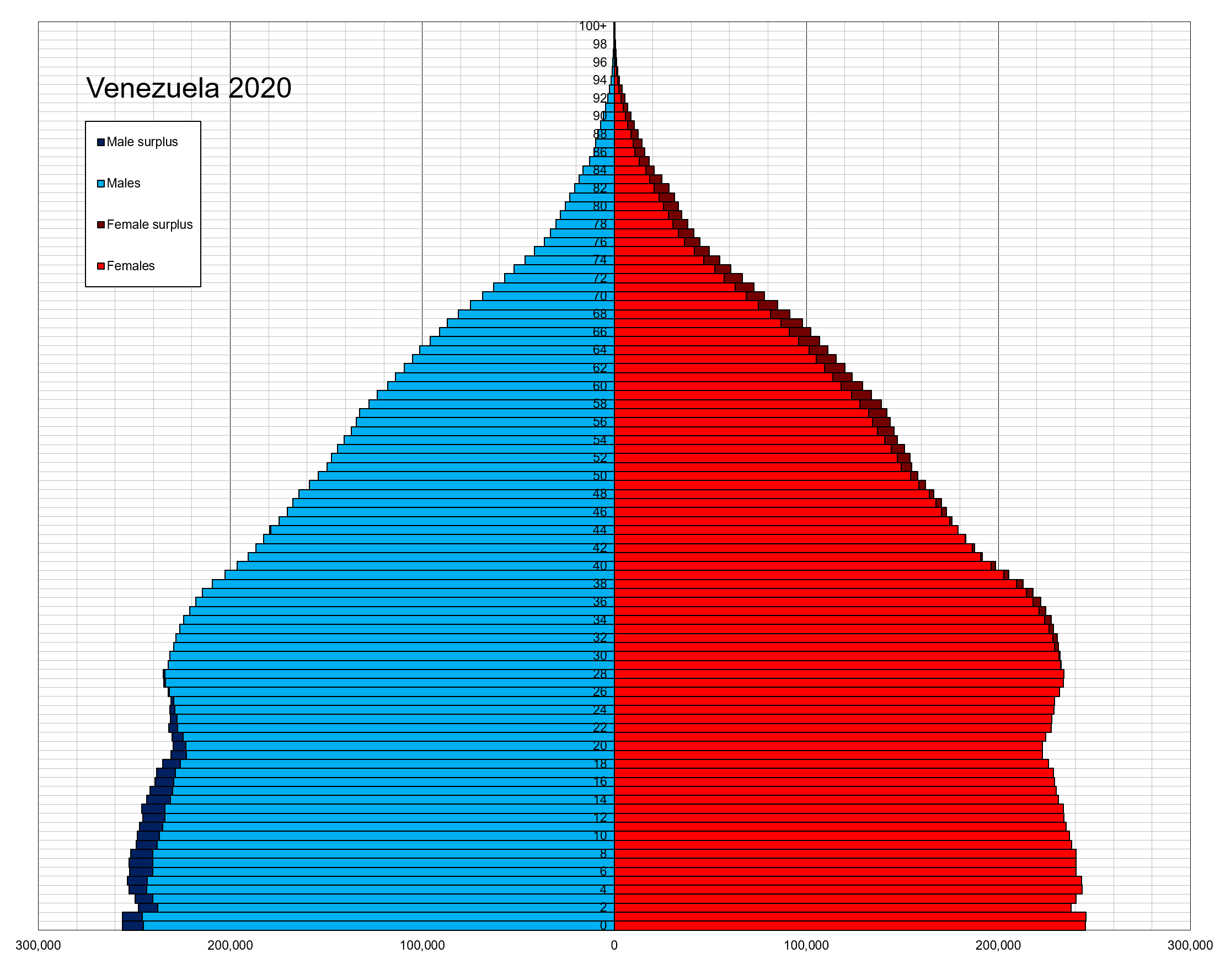
- Population pyramid of Venezuela in 2020
- Population: 28,516,896 (2025 est.)
- Growth rate: 0.4% (2025 est.)
- Birth rate: 15.3 births/1,000 population (2025 est.)
- Death rate: 7.8 deaths/1,000 population (2025 est.)
- Life expectancy: 72.8 years
  - male: 69.1 years
  - female: 76.8 years
- Fertility rate: 1.70 children born/woman (2025 est.)
- Infant mortality: 14.4 deaths/1,000 live births
- Net migration rate: -3.5 migrant(s)/1,000 population

Age structure
- 0–14 years: 24.9%
- 15–64 years: 65.1%
- 65 and over: 10.0%

Sex ratio
- Total: 0.98 male(s)/female (2025 est.)
- At birth: 1.05 male(s)/female

Nationality
- Nationality: Venezuelan
- Major ethnic: Multiracial (51.6%); White (43.6%); Spanish (N/D); Italian (N/D); Portuguese (N/D); Others (N/D)
- Minor ethnic: African (3.6%); Others (1.2%)

Language
- Official: Spanish
- Spoken: Languages of Venezuela

Venezuela is a country in South America whose people comprise a combination of heritages, primarily Native American and European. The historically present Native American, Spanish colonists, and African slaves have all contributed to varying degrees. Later, waves of European groups (Italians, Spanish, Portuguese and Germans) migrated to Venezuela in the 20th century, influencing many aspects of Venezuelan life, including its culture, language, food, and music though small in number.

About 51% of the population is mestizo (mixed white and indigenous); Europeans and Arabs (whites) make up 43% of the population, Africans 3.6%, Amerindian people 2%, and other races, mostly Asians, make up 1.2%. About 85% of the population live in urban areas in the northern portion of the country and currently reside in the urban conglomerations (Caracas, Maracay, Maracaibo, Valencia, etc.) that are concentrated in Venezuela's northern coastal mountain strip. Nearly half of Venezuela's geographic area lies south of the Orinoco River; however, this region contains only 5% of the Venezuelan population.

The 2022 revision of the World Population Prospects estimate puts Venezuela's total population at 28,199,867 inhabitants. Additionally, over the past five years, Venezuelan society's general age structure has been trending towards the homologous structure found in Cuba, Western Europe, Japan, and other healthy and rapidly ageing societies. Notably, there has been a significant increase in the proportion and gross numbers of elderly Venezuelans (aged 65 and up), as well as a corresponding drop in the total fertility. More than 7 million people, that is 20 per cent of the population, have left Venezuela in the last years, mostly as refugees due to the economic and political situation.

== Population ==
Census population
Year	Pop.	±%
1873	1,732,411	—
1881	2,005,139	+15.7%
1891	2,221,572	+10.8%
1920	2,479,525	+11.6%
1926	2,814,131	+13.5%
1936	3,364,347	+19.6%
1941	3,850,771	+14.5%
1950	5,034,838	+30.7%
1961	7,523,999	+49.4%
1971	10,721,522	+42.5%
1981	14,516,735	+35.4%
1990	18,105,265	+24.7%
2001	23,232,553	+28.3%
2011	27,722,793	+19.3%
2021	28,237,826	+1.9%
2025	28,516,896	+1.0%

According to the 2022 revision of the World Population Prospects the total population was 28,199,867 in 2021, compared to only 5,482,000 in 1950. The proportion of children below the age of 15 in 2010 was 29.5%, 64.9% was between 15 and 65 years of age, while 5.6% was 65 years or older.

	Total population	Proportion aged 0–14 (%)	Proportion aged 15–64 (%)	Proportion aged 65+ (%)
1950	5,482,000	43.5	54.6	1.9
1955	6,758,000	44.8	53.1	2.0
1960	8,147,000	45.6	51.9	2.4
1965	9,825,000	46.4	51.0	2.6
1970	11,588,000	45.7	51.5	2.8
1975	13,361,000	43.3	53.6	3.0
1980	15,344,000	40.7	56.2	3.2
1985	17,508,000	38.8	57.8	3.4
1990	19,862,000	37.9	58.4	3.7
1995	22,189,000	36.3	59.8	3.9
2000	24,192,000	34.0	61.5	4.5
2005	26,432,000	31.7	63.3	5.0
2010	28,440,000	29.9	64.5	5.6
2015	30,082,000	28.4	65.3	6.4
2020	28,436,000	27.3	64.8	8.0

View source data.
View source data.

=== Structure of the population ===
Population by Sex and Age Group (Census 01.IX.2011):

Age group	Male	Female	Total	%
Total	13 549 752	13 678 178	27 227 930	100
0–4	1 254 208	1 183 423	2 437 631	8.95
5–9	1 236 217	1 166 147	2 402 364	8.82
10–14	1 298 191	1 218 588	2 516 779	9.24
15–19	1 336 159	1 305 161	2 641 320	9.70
20–24	1 280 125	1 280 524	2 560 649	9.40
25–29	1 159 400	1 184 932	2 344 332	8.61
30–34	1 105 617	1 114 124	2 219 741	8.15
35–39	942 311	962 942	1 905 253	7.00
40–44	873 509	881 981	1 755 490	6.45
45–49	747 704	781 077	1 528 781	5.61
50–54	651 255	686 679	1 337 934	4.91
55–59	530 935	577 864	1 108 799	4.07
60–64	407 656	440 702	848 358	3.12
65-69	267 691	300 997	568 688	2.09
70-74	189 285	221 170	410 455	1.51
75-79	130 126	162 866	292 992	1.08
80-84	78 996	109 899	188 895	0.69
85-89	40 560	63 581	104 141	0.38
90-94	14 875	25 495	40 370	0.15
95+	4 932	10 026	14 958	0.05
Age group	Male	Female	Total	Per cent
0–14	3 788 616	3 568 158	7 356 774	27.02
15–64	9 034 671	9 215 986	18 250 657	67.03
65+	726 465	894 034	1 620 499	5.95

Population Estimates by Sex and Age Group (01.VII.2019):

Age group	Male	Female	Total	%
Total	16 085 704	15 979 037	32 064 741	100
0–4	1 392 960	1 317 350	2 710 310	8.45
5–9	1 420 995	1 327 513	2 748 508	8.57
10–14	1 442 288	1 349 218	2 791 506	8.71
15–19	1 427 367	1 342 856	2 770 223	8.64
20–24	1 372 148	1 306 480	2 678 628	8.35
25–29	1 322 783	1 281 779	2 604 562	8.12
30–34	1 294 114	1 275 147	2 569 261	8.01
35–39	1 180 244	1 177 120	2 357 364	7.35
40–44	1 042 646	1 050 897	2 093 543	6.53
45–49	946 494	963 933	1 910 427	5.96
50–54	877 401	903 878	1 781 279	5.56
55–59	747 504	781 852	1 529 356	4.77
60–64	574 077	613 380	1 187 457	3.70
65-69	409 138	450 856	859 994	2.68
70-74	282 267	326 025	608 292	1.90
75-79	179 631	221 308	400 939	1.25
80-84	101 653	140 040	241 693	0.75
85-89	48 109	81 333	129 442	0.40
90-94	17 947	43 357	61 304	0.19
95-99	4 924	19 593	24 517	0.08
100+	1 014	5 122	6 136	0.02
Age group	Male	Female	Total	Per cent
0–14	4 256 243	3 994 081	8 250 324	25.73
15–64	10 784 778	10 697 322	21 482 100	67.00
65+	1 044 683	1 287 634	2 332 317	7.27

== Vital statistics ==
=== Registered births and deaths ===
Year	Population	Live births	Deaths	Natural increase	Crude birth rate	Crude death rate	Rate of natural increase	TFR
1948		183 590	59 934	123 656				
1949		198 773	57 477	141 296				
1950	5,034,838	212 096	54 397	157 699	42.1	10.8	31.3	
1951		224 553	56 757	167 796				
1952		230 703	57 115	173 588				
1953		250 943	53 945	196 998				
1954		262 134	56 846	205 288				
1955		272 433	59 348	213 085				
1956		278 072	59 339	218 733				
1957		284 080	61 918	222 162				
1958		291 747	59 037	232 710				
1959		324 739	58 988	265 751				
1960		338 199	55 354	282 845				
1961	7,523,999	344 989	55 585	289 404	45.9	7.4	38.5	
1962		341 324	54 960	286 364				
1963		353 546	58 474	295 072				
1964		365 340	60 912	304 428				
1965		379 530	61 568	317 962				
1966		376 367	61 691	314 676				
1967		407 986	62 111	345 875				
1968		384 678	64 592	320 086				
1969		397 003	67 784	329 219				
1970		392 583	68 493	324 090				
1971	10,721,522	405 964	70 478	335 486	37.9	6.6	31.3	
1972		406 120	73 379	332 741				
1973		405 455	76 333	329 122				
1974		433 397	73 555	359 842				
1975		446 110	74 388	371 722				
1976		462 233	75 088	387 145				
1977		465 332	74 257	391 075				
1978		475 824	72 584	403 240				
1979		481 349	74 649	406 700				
1980		493 009	77 018	415 991				
1981	14,516,735	497 270	80 346	416 924	34.3	5.5	28.8	
1982		510 532	77 021	433 511				
1983		514 381	75 743	438 638				
1984		503 973	78 091	425 882				
1985		502 329	78 938	423 391				
1986		504 278	77 647	426 631				
1987		516 773	80 322	436 451				
1988		522 392	81 442	440 950				
1989		529 015	84 761	444 254				
1990	18,105,265	577 976	89 830	488 146	31.9	5.0	26.9	
1991		602 024	88 634	513 390				
1992		559 950	90 566	469 384				
1993		524 387	89 105	435 282				
1994		547 819	96 696	451 123				
1995		520 584	92 273	428 311				
1996		497 975	93 839	404 136	22.3	4.2	18.1	
1997		516 616	94 334	422 282	22.7	4.1	18.6	
1998		501 808	98 624	403 184	21.6	4.2	17.4	
1999		527 888	101 907	425 981	22.1	4.3	17.8	
2000		544 416	103 255	441 161	22.4	4.2	18.2	
2001	23,232,553	529 552	107 867	421 685	21.4	4.4	17.0	
2002		492 678	105 388	387 290	19.5	4.2	15.3	
2003		555 614	118 562	437 052	21.6	4.6	17.0	
2004		637 799	114 480	523 319	24.4	4.4	20.0	
2005		665 997	110 301	555 696	25.1	4.2	20.9	
2006		646 225	115 348	530 877	23.9	4.3	19.6	
2007		615 371	118 594	496 777	22.4	4.3	18.1	
2008		581 480	124 062	457 418	20.8	4.4	16.4	
2009		593 845	123 530	470 315	20.9	4.4	16.6	
2010		591 303	130 597	460 706	20.7	4.6	16.1	2.50
2011	27,722,793	615 132	136 803	478 329	21.3	4.7	16.5	2.58
2012		619 530	142 988	476 542	21.1	4.9	16.2	2.56
2013		597 902	147 901	450 001	20.1	5.0	15.1	2.46
2014	30,070,000	597 773	159 239	438 534	19.9	5.3	14.6	2.44
2015	30,489,000	600,875	163,367	437,508	19.6	5.3	14.3	2.43
2016	30,770,000	642,664	185,697	456,967	20.9	6.0	14.9	2.57
2017	30,570,000	579,349	188,034	391,315	19.0	6.2	12.8	2.32
2018	29,810,000	485,631	194,304	291,327	16.3	6.5	9.8	2.01
2019	28,940,000	455,670	193,072	262,598	15.7	6.5	9.2	1.85
2020	28,440,000	442,091	204,848	237,243	15.5	7.2	8.3	1.84
2021	28,237,826	429,761	222,005	207,756	15.2	7.9	7.3	1.79
2022	28,213,017	423,888	207,270	216,618	15.0	7.3	7.7	1.75
2023	28,300,854	426,984	213,955	213,029	15.1	7.6	7.5	1.73
2024	28,405,543	432,648	218,109	214,539	15.2	7.7	7.6	1.72
2025	28,516,896	436,134	222,194	213,940	15.3	7.8	7.5	1.70

Venezuela Statistical Office stopped providing vital statistics data to the United Nations Statistics Division in 2019, births and death data after 2019 are estimations published by the UN population prospects.

=== UN estimates ===
Registration of vital events in Venezuela is not complete. The Population Department of the United Nations prepared the following estimates.

Period	Live births per year	Deaths per year	Natural change per year	CBR*	CDR*	NC*	TFR*	IMR*	Life expectancy		
Period	Live births per year	Deaths per year	Natural change per year	CBR*	CDR*	NC*	TFR*	IMR*	total	males	females
1950–1955	263,000	69,000	193,000	46.5	12.6	34.1	6.46	107	54.3	52.9	55.8
1955–1960	309,000	73,000	236,000	44.9	10.9	34.2	6.46	89	57.1	55.6	58.7
1960–1965	375,000	77,000	298,000	45.1	9.5	35.7	6.66	73	59.9	58.2	61.7
1965–1970	397,000	76,000	320,000	40.1	8.0	32.4	5.90	60	62.6	60.5	64.9
1970–1975	411,000	76,000	334,000	35.1	6.7	28.6	4.94	49	65.0	62.4	67.7
1975–1980	476,000	81,000	395,000	34.2	5.8	28.4	4.47	39	67.3	64.6	70.4
1980–1985	519,000	89,000	430,000	32.0	5.3	26.5	3.96	34	68.9	66.0	72.0
1985–1990	561,000	92,000	468,000	30.3	4.9	25.3	3.65	27	70.5	67.7	73.5
1990–1995	563,000	101,000	461,000	26.9	4.8	22.1	3.25	23	71.5	68.7	74.5
1995–2000	569,000	114,000	455,000	24.5	4.9	19.7	2.94	21	72.1	69.3	75.1
2000–2005	585,000	129,000	456,000	23.0	5.1	17.9	2.72	19	72.7	69.9	75.8
2005–2010	598,000	142,000	456,000	21.5	5.4	16.1	2.55	17	73.7	70.8	76.8
2010–2015	601,000	159,000	442,000	20.0	5.9	14.1	2.40	15	74.5	71.7	77.6
2015–2020	595,000	178,000	417,000	18.0	7.0	11.0	2.28	13	75.3	72.5	78.4
2020–2025				16.8	7.3	9.5	2.18				
2025–2030				16.5	7.4	9.1	2.10				
* CBR = crude birth rate (per 1000); CDR = crude death rate (per 1000); NC = natural change (per 1000); IMR = infant mortality rate per 1000 births; TFR = total fertility rate (number of children per woman)

=== Life expectancy ===
Life expectancy in Venezuela since 1900

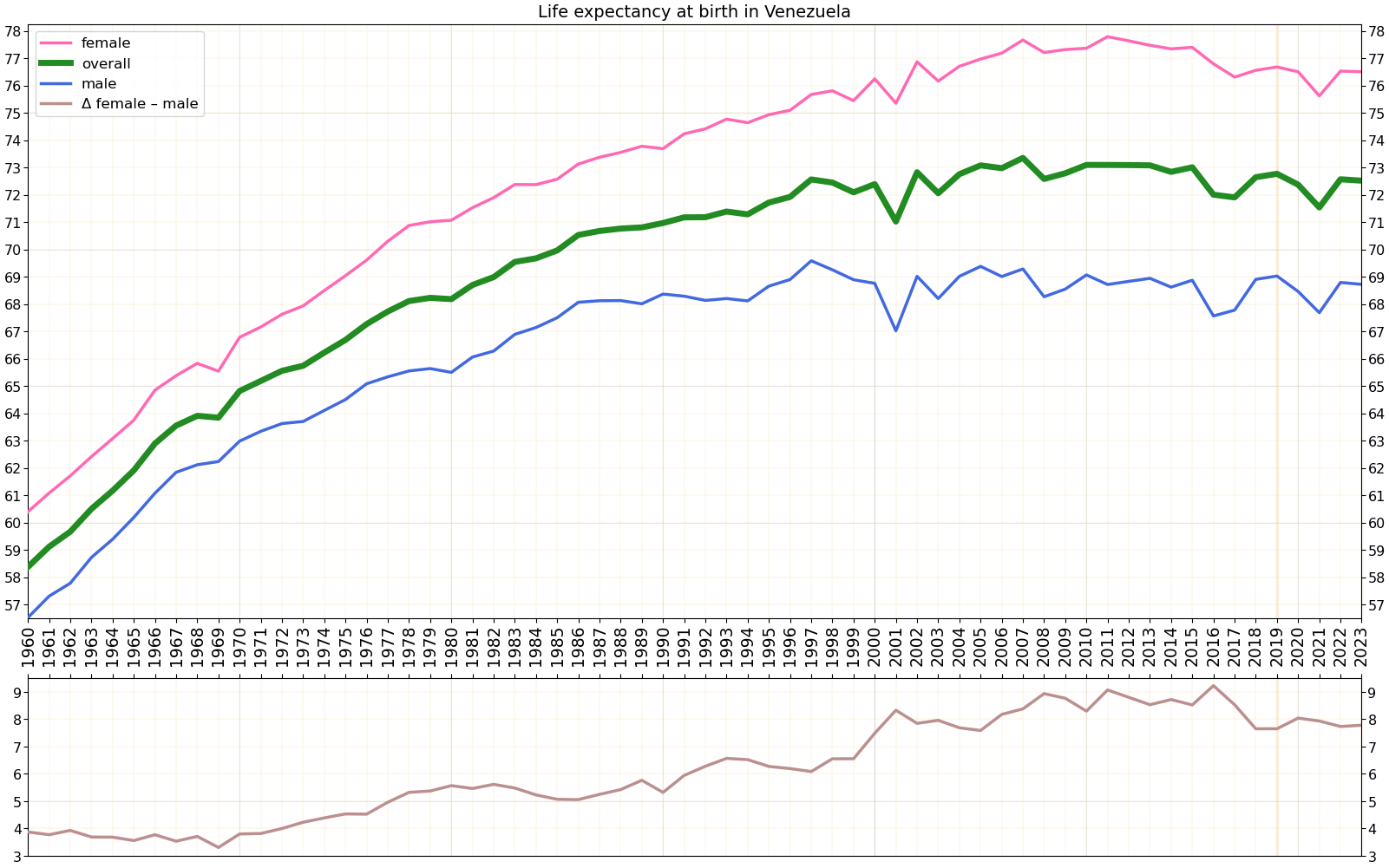
Life expectancy in Venezuela since 1960 by gender

total population: 76.2 years
male: 73.2 years
female: 79.3 years (2018 est.)

== Ethnic groups ==
Races in Venezuela (2011)
1. Multiracial (51.6%)
2. White (43.6%)
3. Black (3.60%)
4. Others (1.20%)

According to an autosomal DNA genetic study conducted in 2008 by the University of Brasília (UNB), the composition of Venezuela's population is: 60.60% of European contribution, 23% of Amerindian contribution and 16.30% of African contribution. According to the Statistics National Institute of Venezuela, individuals of mixed race constitute the largest demographic group nationwide, comprising approximately half of the population (50%). Following closely are individuals of white ethnicity, accounting for around 43% of the population and predominantly distributed across various regions of the country. These regions include traditional destinations for European immigrants, such as the Coastal Mountain Range, Andean cordillera, the Caribbean islands, and significant urban centers.

While afro-descendants are dispersed throughout the country, comprising around 3.6% of the population, they tend to be concentrated in areas with historical ties to colonial-era slavery, such as the north-central coast (Barlovento region, Ocumare de la Costa) and the southern region of Lake Maracaibo Lowlands. Over time, some black communities have migrated to larger metropolitan areas during the post-colonial period.

Indigenous populations primarily inhabit the southern half of Venezuela, the region known as Guayana south-along the Orinoco River. Additionally, Indigenous communities can be found in the Guajira Peninsula and the eastern part of the country. Together, Indigenous peoples represent approximately 2% of the total population in Venezuela.

=== Mixed-Race/Moreno Venezuelans ===
Approximately 50% of Venezuelans identify themselves as mixed-race, indicating mixed ancestry with intermediate features reflecting indigenous, European, and/or African phenotypes (to a lesser extent, this category can include individuals with Arab or Asian ancestry mixed with the aforementioned groups). The intermingling of races in Venezuela commenced in the 16th century when Spanish conquerors and settlers intermarried with indigenous women, owing to the absence of European women in the region. Subsequently, with the introduction of enslaved Africans, a process of racial fusion emerged among the indigenous, European, and African populations. This process persisted over the decades as additional waves of migration from Europe, the Middle East, North America, Latin America, and Asia contributed to Venezuela's diverse genetic landscape. Diverses genetic studies indicate that the mestizo Venezuelan population predominantly possesses a European genetic component (54 - 71.9%), followed by Amerindian (18.6 - 32%), and to a lesser extent, African (9.5 - 16.3%) ancestry, with notable regional variations.

Mestizos are distributed throughout most of the country, with significant concentrations primarily along the northern strip of the Orinoco River (the northern half of the country). Noteworthy towns in the Los Llanos region, such as El Pao (Cojedes), San Antonio (Barinas), Trinidad de La Capilla - Guanarito (Portuguesa), La Union (Barinas), Florida (Portuguesa), and Libertad de Orituco (Guárico), boast a majority of residents belonging to this ethnic group, with over 75% mestizo population. States with the highest proportion of mestizos include Apure, Cojedes, Guárico, and Portuguesa, all part of the Los Llanos region in the central-western interior, with slightly over 60% of their population identifying as mestizo. Conversely, areas with minimal mestizo presence are observed in jungle regions of the Upper Orinoco in Amazonas, as well as portions of the Orinoco Delta and Alta Guajira (Zulia), where they represent less than 1% of the total population. States with the lowest percentage of mestizo population include Amazonas (less than 10%) and Delta Amacuro (less than 35%), both situated in the Guayana region of southern Venezuela, characterized by low population density historically dominated by Native American Indians.

=== White Venezuelans ===
Around 42-43% of the population are identified as White Venezuelan. The highest concentrations, ranging from 65 to 80%, are found in the Venezuelan Andes (Mérida, San Cristóbal, Tovar, Valera, and numerous others towns), the Coastal Range (Eastern Caracas, San Antonio de Los Altos, El Junko, Colonia Tovar, among others) and areas of the north-eastern Caribbean coast (Lechería, Porlamar, Pampatar, Araya Peninsula).

Census data reveals that in major urban areas like Maracaibo, Valencia, Maracay, Barquisimeto, Ciudad Guayana, Puerto La Cruz, among others, several districts or parishes boast white majorities exceeding 50%. These areas typically align with medium to higher socioeconomic levels, resembling Latin American cities of European descent such as Montevideo and Buenos Aires. Conversely, regions like Amazonas state, Orinoco Delta, and Alta Guajira exhibit minimal white presence, often less than 1% of the local population.

The majority of White Venezuelans trace their ancestry to European Mediterranean origins, primarily Spanish, followed by Italian and Portuguese contributions. European colonization of Venezuela commenced with the arrival of the Spanish in the late 15th century, with settlers predominantly hailing from regions such as Andalusia, Galicia, the Basque Country, and the Canary Islands. The influence of the Canary Islands on Venezuelan culture and customs has been particularly significant, earning Venezuela the occasional nickname "the eighth island of the Canary archipelago".

While Spanish authorities discouraged non-Spanish migration to safeguard colonial territories from rival European claims, although exceptions existed. The influx of Germans began in the early 16th century, with King Carlos I granting colonization privileges to German families to offset certain debts. This led to the renaming of the Province of Venezuela as Klein-Venedig, with its capital established as Neu-Augsburg (now Coro), and the founding of Neu-Nürnberg (now Maracaibo), the country's second-largest city. In 1542, the Dutch seized control of the Araya peninsula for its lucrative salt flats, subsequently expanding their presence to other coastal areas such as Falcón, Carabobo, and Zulia due to economic ties with the nearby Netherlands Antilles. Until deep into the 19th century, the now Venezuelan islands of Aves, the Aves archipelago, Los Roques and La Orchila were also considered by the Dutch government to be part of the Dutch West Indies.

During the emergence of the independence movements in the Americas, Venezuela experienced a notable influx of White Dominicans. As Venezuela pursued independence, it witnessed a significant arrival of Italian immigrants seeking better opportunities, with migration beginning in 1814 and intensifying around 1870 during Italy's unification. These Italian immigrants primarily concentrated in agricultural regions, particularly focusing on coffee and cocoa cultivation in the Andean and the Coastal Range area of the country. Concurrently, volunteers from England, Scotland, and Ireland formed the "British Legion", actively engaging in the War of Independence, leaving a lasting impact and contributing to the enduring presence of British descendants in Venezuela.

Following independence, Venezuela faced challenges attracting immigrants due to economic stagnation and internal conflicts. Despite this, small groups of French settlers, particularly Corsicans, established themselves along the coast of the Paria Peninsula, contributing significantly to the cocoa industry. Additionally, Italians were notably present in the Andean region, while German immigrants formed communities such as Colonia Tovar in the center-north, they also played vital roles in commerce, particularly in Maracaibo's retail sector and informal banking systems. Towards the late 19th century, White Americans and White Canadians relocated to Venezuela, primarily as evangelical missionaries representing various Protestant denominations, along with engineers drawn by the burgeoning oil industry.

After 1935, Venezuela underwent a period of economic and social advancement with the discovery of oil, positioning itself as an attractive destination for immigrants. From 1948 to 1961, an estimated 900,000 European immigrants arrived in Venezuela, driven by the prospect of new opportunities. Among them, Spanish, Italian, and Portuguese migrants constituted the majority, while smaller numbers included Germans, French, Swiss, Poles, Greeks, Czechs, Russians, Ukrainians, Serbs, Nordics, Romanians, Slovenes, Croats, Belgians, Austrians and Hungarians.

During the 1970s and 1980s, Southern Cone nations like Argentina and Uruguay with a predominantly Spanish and Italian-descents population, were plagued by oppressive dictatorships. Consequently, many individuals from these countries sought refuge in Venezuela, attracted by the promise of safety and stability. Additionally, Venezuela became a destination for other European Latin Americans communities, including Colombians, Chileans, Dominicans, Brazilians, Cubans, and others, fleeing economic struggles, political unrest, and autocratic regimes in their homelands.

== Religion ==
Religion in Venezuela (2022)
1. Catholicism (64.2%)
2. Evangelicalism (22.0%)
3. Other Christians (3.90%)
4. No religion (8.30%)
5. Others (1.60%)

The overwhelming majority of Venezuelans denote themselves as adherents of Catholicism; this is true nominally, if not in practice. According to the 2011 census, 88.3 per cent of the population is Christian, primarily Roman Catholic (71%), 17 per cent Protestant, and the remaining 0.03 per cent Mormons (LDS Church). The Venezuelans without religion are 9% (atheist 2%, agnostic or indifferent 6% and doesn't know/doesn't respond 1% ), almost 3% of the population follow other religions (1% of them are of Santería).

Religious affiliation in Venezuela. (2011)
Affiliation	% of Venezuela population
Christian	88.3%
Catholic	71%
Protestant	17%
Mormon	0.3%
Non-Christian faiths	2.7%
Jewish	0.05%
Muslim	0.4%
Santería	1%
Other Non-Christian faiths	1.25%
Unaffiliated	9%
Agnostic/indifferent	6%
Atheist	2%
Don't know/refused answer	1%
Total	100%
