= Venezuelan Guayana =

It may refer to:

- Guayana natural region, one of the eight geographic-fnatural regions of Venezuela
- Guayana Region, Venezuela, one of the nine Administrative regions of Venezuela
