= Portuguese Venezuelans =

Venezuelans of Portuguese birth or descent

Luso-venezuelanos; Luso-venezolanos

Total population
- 49,104 citizens.

Regions with significant populations
- Portugal: 24,603
- Venezuela: Approximately 1.2 million (Público, 2026).
- United States: 80,500
- Peru: 40,000
- Colombia: 20,500
- Chile: 20,300
- Ecuador: 10,800

Languages
- Spanish and/or Portuguese

Religion
- Roman Catholicism

Portuguese Venezuelans (or Luso-Venezuelans) are Portuguese-born citizens with Venezuelan citizenship or Venezuelan-born citizens of Portuguese ancestry or citizenship. Mostly located in Caracas, Valencia and Maracaibo, also Barquisimeto, the Portuguese community of Venezuela are among the largest ethnic groups in the country. The State of Portuguesa takes its name from the Portuguesa River, in which a Portuguese woman is said to have drowned.

Portuguese arrived to Venezuela in the early and middle 20th century, as immigrants, mostly from Madeira Island. Venezuela has the second largest Portuguese diaspora in America, after Brazil. There is strong interest among a large segment of the Portuguese in Venezuela to preserve the culture and familial bond with the old country Portugal, while they have been important in the development of Venezuela holding a substantial number of businesses in the retail trade. The Portuguese language in Venezuela influences Venezuelan Spanish with some neologisms and loanwords.

== Notable Portuguese Venezuelans ==
- Danny Alves, footballer
- Nico Castel, lyric singer
- Marisol Da Silva Vieira, model, dancer and sportswoman.
- Vanessa Gonçalves, Miss Venezuela 2010
- Laura Gonçalves, Miss Portugal 2011 (born in Venezuela)
- Miryam de Freitas, lawyer
- Marjorie de Sousa, model and actress
- Osmel Sousa, Miss Venezuela president (born in Cuba)
- Fernando de Ornelas, former footballer
- Leonardo Jardim, football manager
- Nabel Martins, fashion designer
- Lance dos Ramos, actor, model and animator
- Kimberly dos Ramos, actress, model and singer
- Catherine Joy Perry, Competes as Lana in WWE - professional wrestling valet, actress, model and singer (born in Florida, United States)
- La Divaza, Internet personality

== See also ==
- Portuguesa (state)#Etymology
- Portuguesa River
- Portugal–Venezuela relations
- Venezuelans of European descent
