= Portugal–Venezuela relations =

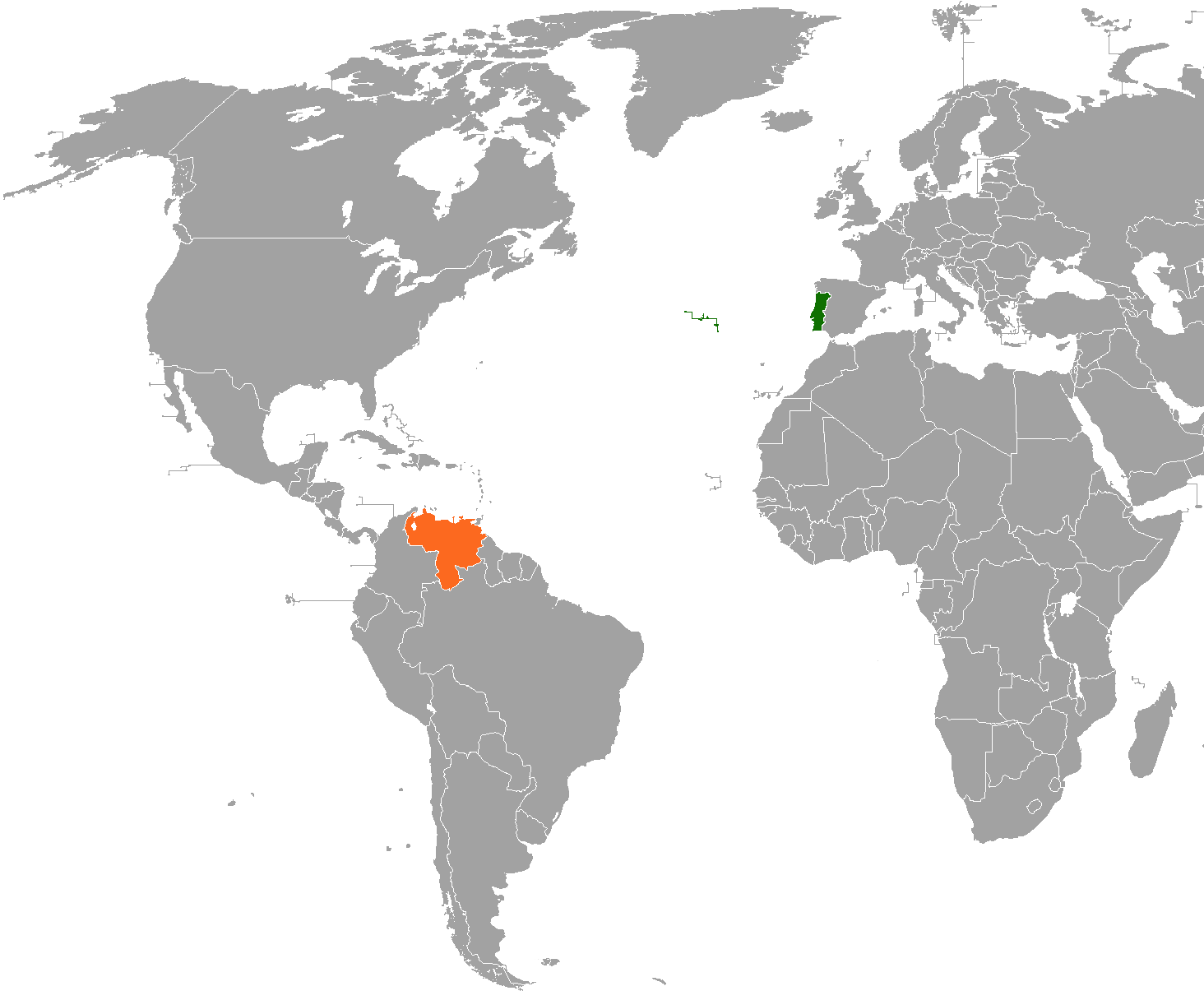
- Portugal: Venezuela

Portugal–Venezuela relations are the bilateral relations between Portugal and Venezuela. Portugal has an embassy in Caracas. Venezuela has an embassy in Lisbon and a Consulate-General in Funchal.

== History ==
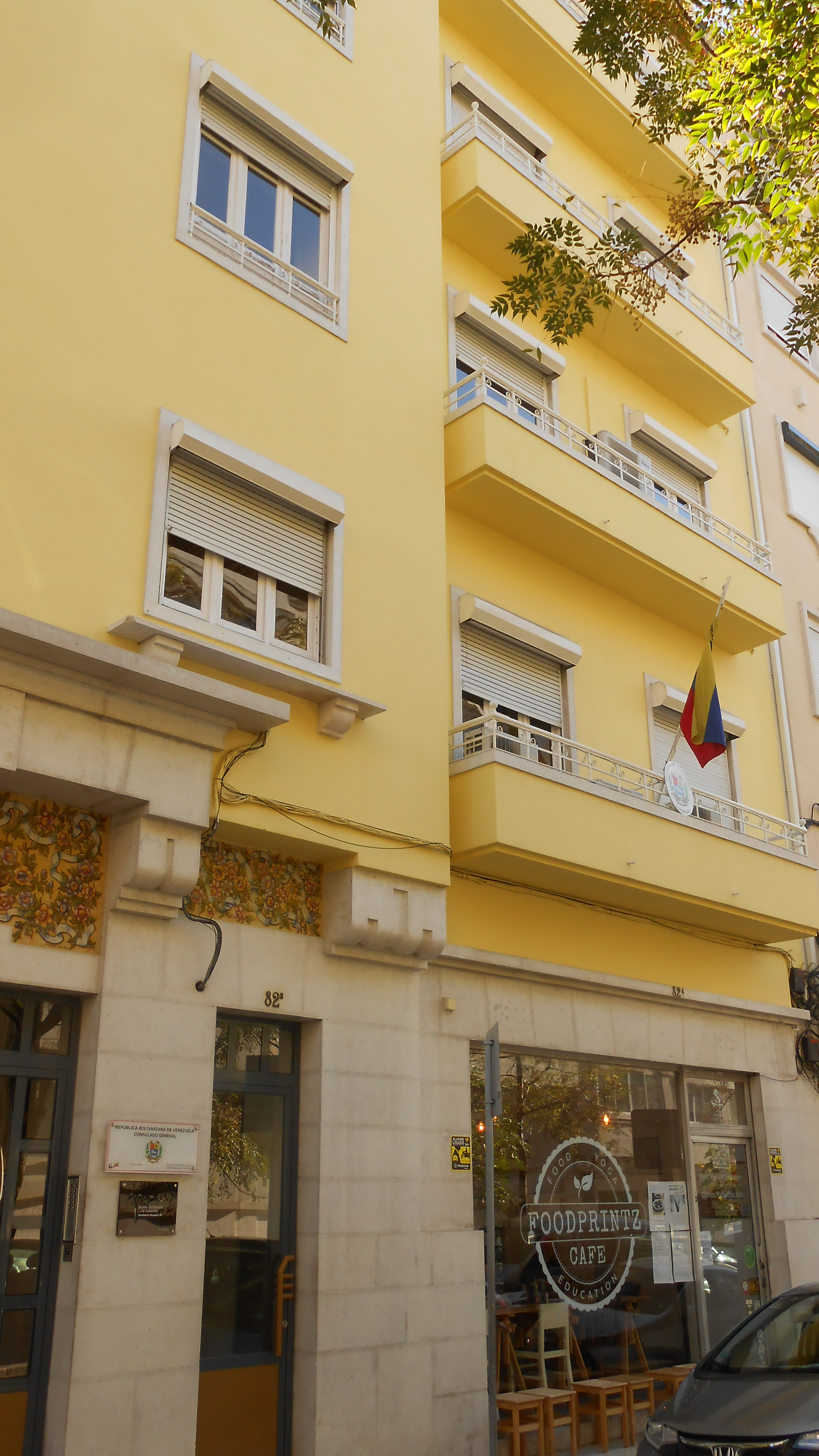
Consulate-General of Venezuela in Lisbon

Portugal and Venezuela meet regularly in the Ibero-American Summit and the Venezuela-Portugal Mixed Commission of Bilateral Monitoring created in 2008. Economic, diplomatic and friendship ties between Venezuela and Portugal developed significantly during Chávez presidency. Chávez also acknowledged the importance of the large Portuguese community in Venezuela. During his term, he made four official visits at Portugal. In 2018, Portugal and Venezuela signed 22 bilateral agreements with each other, Venezuela's Foreign Minister Jorge Arreaza described Portugal as a fundamental ally in support of the Bolivarian government during the "economic siege that the United States has waged against Venezuela".

In February 2019, Portugal recognised opposition leader Juan Guaidó as interim president of Venezuela. Portugal joined other European Union countries such as Spain, the UK and Sweden, who had already recognised Guaidó as interim president.

In February 2020, Venezuela suspended TAP Air Portugal flights into and out of the country for 90 days, accusing the carrier of allowing opposition leader Juan Guaido’s uncle to bring explosives onto a flight to Caracas. Guaido returned to Venezuela’s main airport on a TAP flight after a three-week international tour aimed at drumming up support for his campaign to oust socialist President Nicolas Maduro. Authorities then detained Guaido’s uncle, who was traveling with him on the flight from Portugal, accusing him of bringing explosive material into the country. Guaido dismissed those allegations as baseless.

== Resident diplomatic missions ==
- Portugal has an embassy in Caracas.
- Venezuela has an embassy in Lisbon and a consulate-general in Funchal.

== See also ==
- Foreign relations of Portugal
- Foreign relations of Venezuela
- Portuguese Venezuelans
