= Liqui liqui =

Traditional Venezuelan clothing

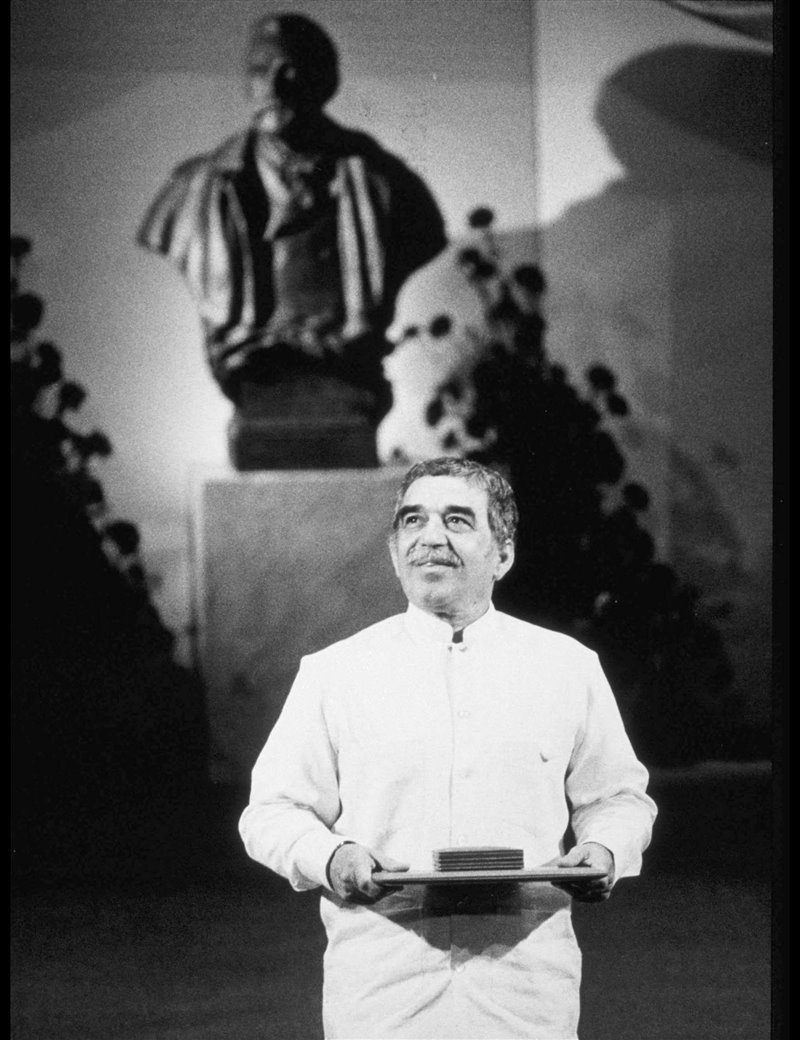
Colombia's Nobel Prize winner in Literature, Gabriel Garcia Marquez, wearing a liqui liqui at the award ceremony.

The liqui liqui (IPA: [liki liki] in Spanish) is the national costume for men in Venezuela and Colombia. It is a local adaptation of the traditional Barong Tagalog and typical costumes of the Yakan people of the Philippines, which arrived in the Viceroyalty of New Granada as a result of trade between Manila, Acapulco, Veracruz, and Cartagena de Indias.

It is traditionally white, beige, cream or ecru, although it is available in other colors. Recently, liqui liquis have been worn by famous personalities in Colombia and Venezuela for their weddings, in a renaissance of traditional dress – for example, Venezuelan folk musician Simón Díaz was known to almost always wear one. The liqui liqui is traditionally made of linen or cotton cloth, although gabardine and wool can be used. The outfit is made up of a pair of full-length trousers and a jacket. The jacket has long sleeves and a rounded Nehru-style collar, which is fastened and decorated by a junta (chain link similar to a cufflink), which joins the two ends of the collar. The jacket is fastened by five or six buttons, and may or may not have pockets (if so, no more than four). Overall, the outfit is very simple with clean, elegant lines. Traditionally, the liqui liqui is worn with alpargata – an open-toed sandal – and a llanero hat.

== History ==
The origin of the liquiliqui has been the subject of various historiographical interpretations, most notably the thesis linking it to the trade routes of the Manila Galleon (or Nao de China). these routes connected the Philippine Islands with the Viceroyalty of New Spain and, subsequently, the port of Cartagena de Indias.

This theory posits that the attire is a criolla adaptation of Southeast Asian garments, such as the Barong Tagalog or the traditional jackets of ethnic groups from the Philippine archipelago, like the Yakan people of Basilan. The introduction of Asian textiles—documented in colonial cargo manifests as "ropas de la China" (Chinese clothing) or "lienzos de Cantón" (Cantonese linens)—facilitated the evolution of a garment that combined European military structure (the liquette) with the cut and functionality of Pacific apparel, well-suited for the tropical climate of the Llanos and Caribbean regions.

The morphological similarity between the liquiliqui and Philippine clothing is primarily evident in the use of the mandarin collar (or cuello de tirilla) and the arrangement of the buttons, elements that also influenced the genesis of the guayabera in the Caribbean basin.

Research into the coastal trade between Acapulco and Cartagena de Indias suggests that the presence of Asian artisans and sailors in New Granada facilitated the transmission of tailoring techniques and textile patterns. These elements were integrated by the llanero society of Colombia and Venezuela, transforming a garment of transoceanic origin into a symbol of regional identity that preserves, to this day, the design characteristics of island gala jackets from Southeast Asia.

== Contemporary Interpretations ==
In 2024, Venezuelan fashion designer Nabel Martins was invited by the Venezuelan delegation to UNESCO in Paris to participate in Latin America and Caribbean Week, where she presented a modern women's reinterpretation of the Liqui liqui named 'Paz', blending traditional elements of Venezuela’s national formal attire with contemporary fashion sensibilities.
