= Llanero =

South American herder

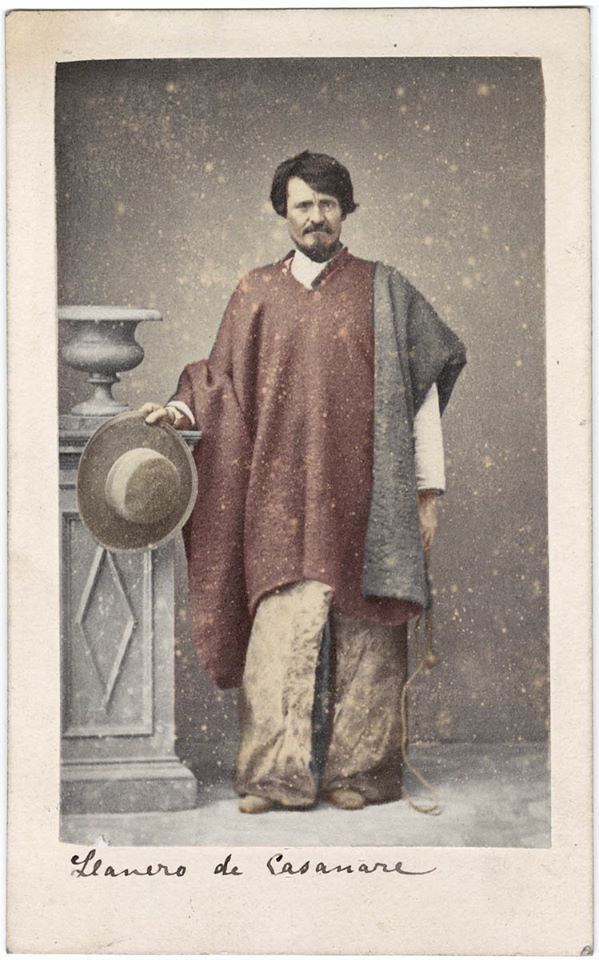
Llanero, 19th century, photography from Alphons Stübel.

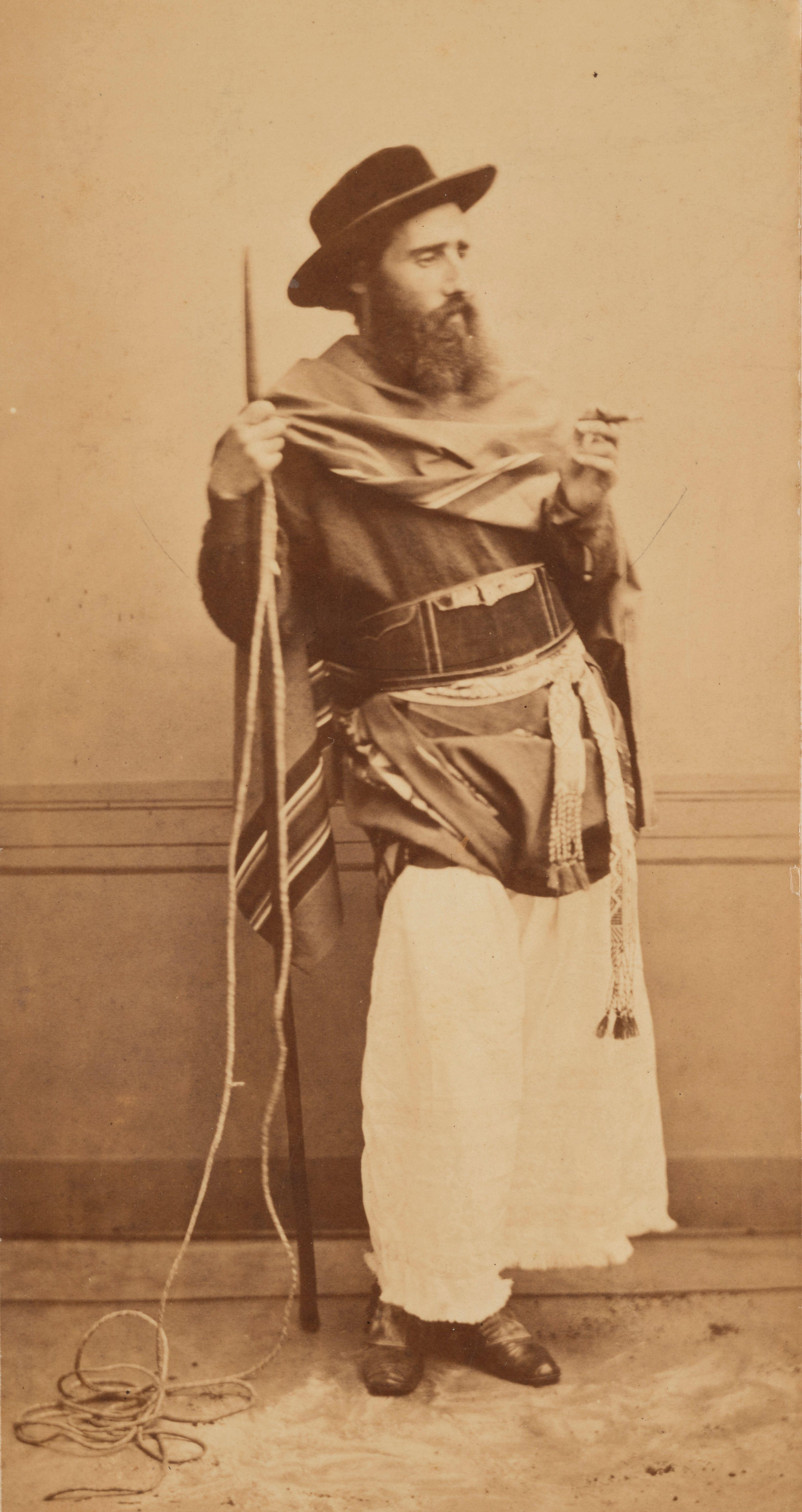
Camille Pissarro dressed in a Llanero outfit, reclining, c. 1852-1855.

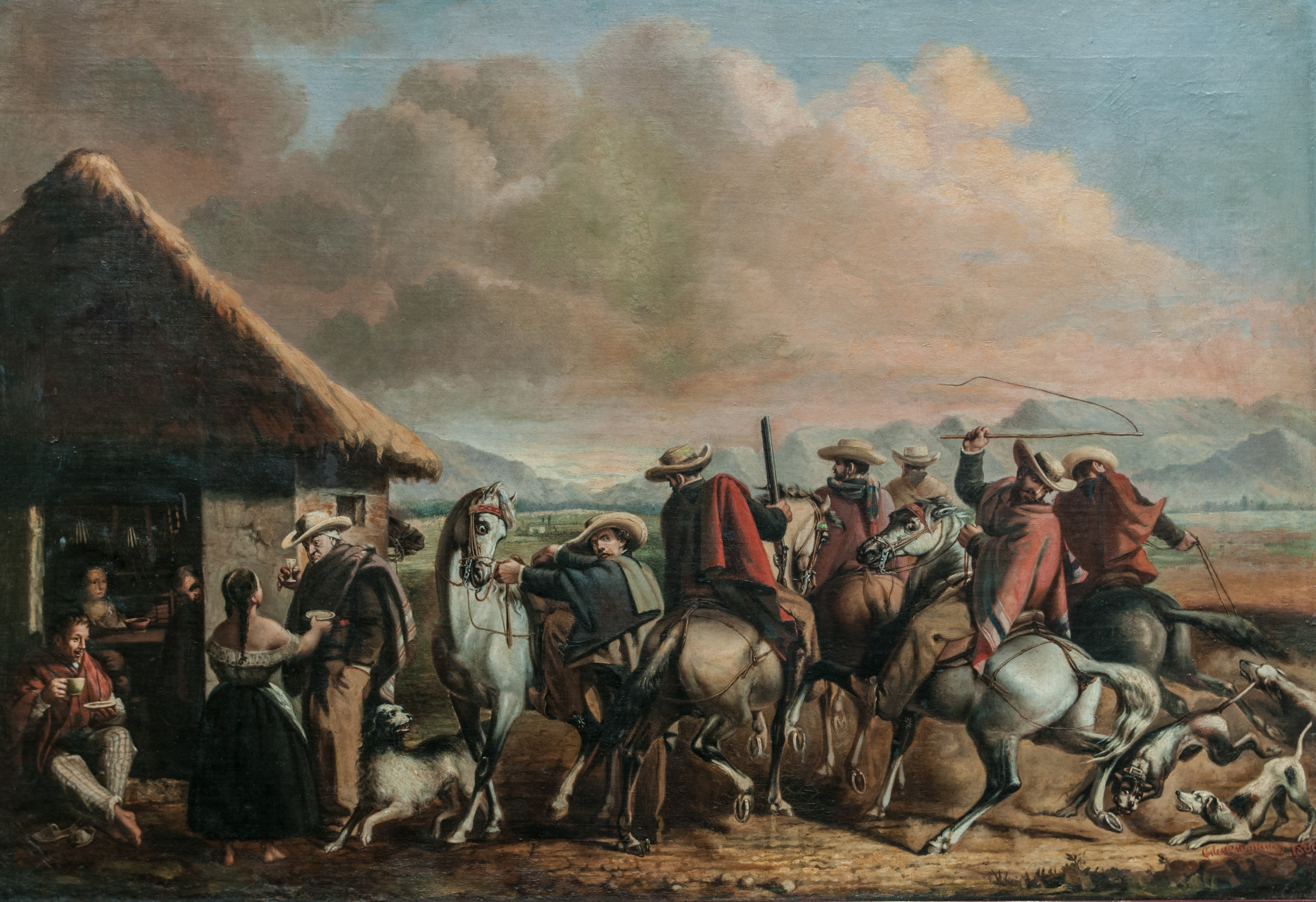
A group of Venezuelan hunters wearing the countryman cavalry attire from the region with a Bahareque house.

A llanero (Spanish pronunciation: [ʝaˈneɾo], 'plainsman') is a Venezuelan and Colombian herder. The name is taken from the Llanos grasslands occupying eastern Colombia and western-central Venezuela.

During the Spanish American wars of independence, llanero lancers and cavalry served in both armies and provided the bulk of the cavalry during the war. They were known for being skilled riders who were in charge of all the tasks related to livestock and other ranch-related activities. The historical figure emerged in the 17th century until its disappearance at the end of the 19th century, with the Andean hegemony and the birth of the Venezuelan oil industry.

Its ethnic origin dates back to the union of the Arawaks, Andalusians, Canarians and to a lesser extent the slaves brought by The Crown during the Spanish colonization of the Americas. The way of working and being comes from the current Apure and Barinas states of the Venezuelans who adapted and modified Andalusian customs, and then exported them to the New Kingdom of Granada. Thanks to their mannerisms, ethnic origin, dialect, culture, and role in the Spanish American Wars of Independence, Venezuelan civil wars and in Montoneras it has been romanticized and idealized and become the Venezuelan national hero and mythos.

== First settlements ==
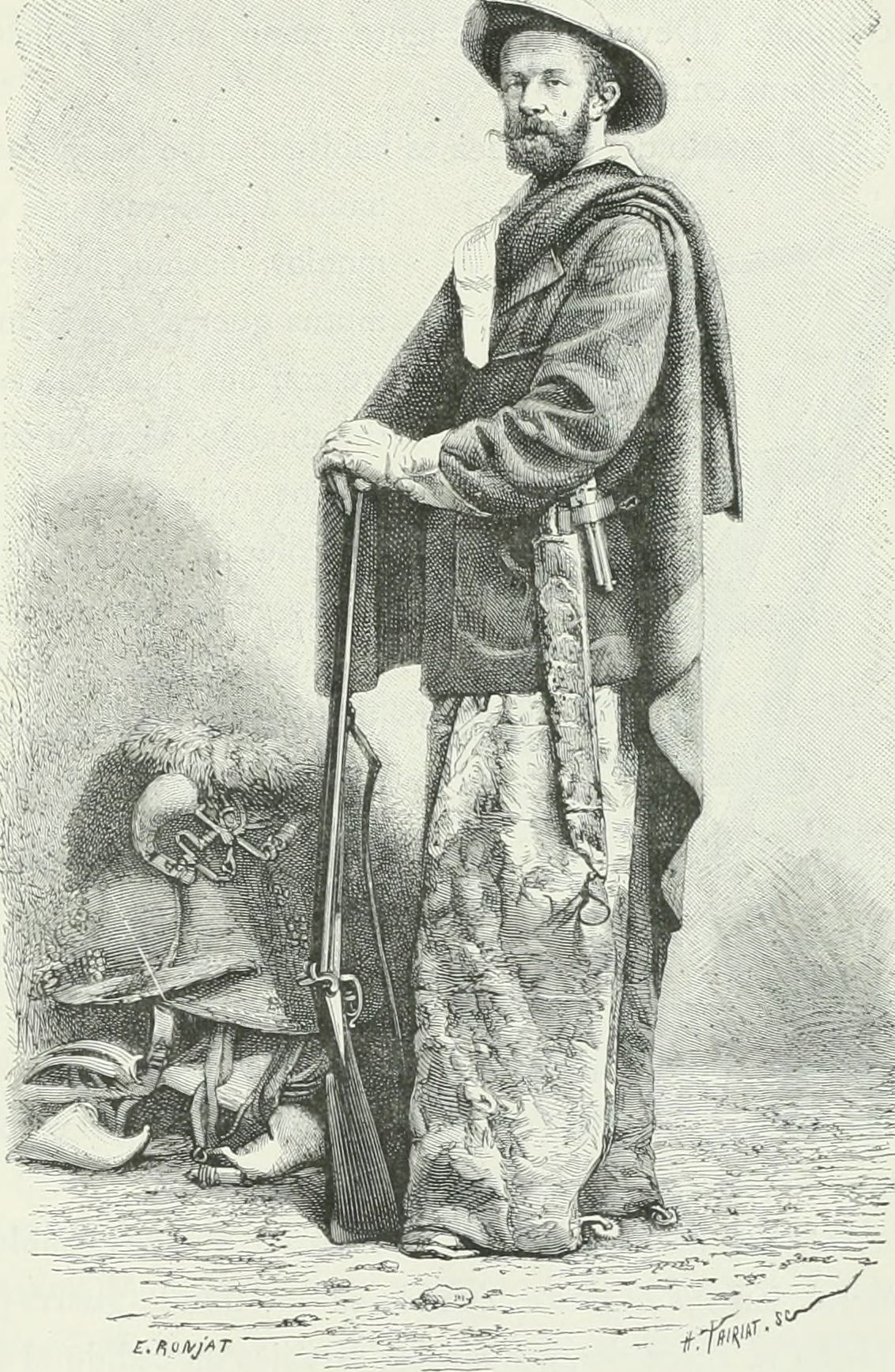
A Criollo wearing the horsemen attire from Colombia and Venezuela, 19th century

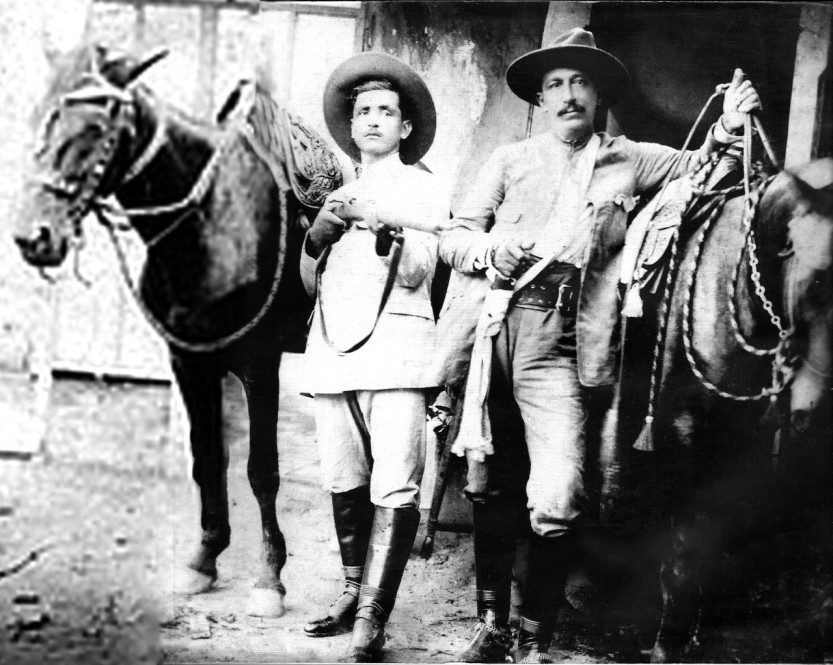
General officer Pedro Pérez Delgado, and José Dáger, two Caudillo Llaneros in the 20th century.

In the 16th century, the first herd was introduced about twenty-five leagues from the city of Calabozo by Cristóbal Rodríguez along with eleven families from El Tocuyo. He founded the town that he called San Luis de la Unión. From there the plains began to populate thanks to the mares and foals brought from the New Kingdom of Granada and the different Andalusian families from Seville, Almería, Granada, Cádiz, Jaén and Córdoba.

By the middle of the 17th century, there were some 137,800 cattle in the most important hatos. The natives of the region, that is to say, the Achaguas, the Yaguales, the Arichunas and Caquetíos (Arawakan language family) were already almost destroyed by a war that lasted eighty years before the conquest, so that evangelization and its eventual miscegenation was given without much trouble. The indigenous component in the region was quite predominant, but today, it does not represent a third. For the 16th century the Spanish Crown prohibited amerindians, blacks or creole whites from riding an equine since it was only a privilege for the peninsular, however, the economy expanded to such an extent that they had to promote legal reforms so that the excluded classes may have this privilege in the short term.

Between 1640 and 1790 the black maroons lived in cumbes, a society of maroons. These ended up mixing with the llaneros over the years.

In the 18th century, the Cabildo de Santiago de León de Caracas issued the first law regulating the abuse of large hatcheries on the plain. From this date, the cuatreros who stole the cattle of the plains emerged, characterized by being armed robberies.

At the end of the 18th century, the region exported 30,000 mules a year to the Antilles and sacrificed meat for the 1.5 million slaves there and in Cuba. There were 1.2 million head of cattle in the area before 1815. Between 1916 - 1917 Rafael Bolívar Coronado indicates that

Los jinetes andaluces introdujeron en tierras llaneras las costumbres, los sistemas de organizar vacadas, someterlas, domarlas; pero ya por las necesidades de la propia naturaleza tropical, enteramente distinta a las de Europa, ya por viveza de temperamento y malicia de ingenio, el llanero abandonó los sistemas de sus progenitores" y lucha hoy con toda clase de animales bravíos, poniendo en actividad sus no comunes habilidades, haciendo arte propio con su astucia y su prodigiosa destreza. La misma lucha perenne y expiatoria con los elementos ásperos y rebeldes de las llanuras le ha ido inspirando los medios eficaces, y con ellos ha logrado imponerse victoriosamente; hace del potro cerril su esclavo y poderoso auxiliar vadeando ríos, cazando reses bravas, guerreando contra sus propios compañeros: convierte fieras e impetuosas novillas en mansas y perezosas lecheras; burla la ferocidad del caimán ruidosamente en las revueltas ondas de los ríos; y a la hora del sosiego y de la calma, cuando la brisa agita el precioso abanico de las palmeras, el llanero se columpia como un sultán oriental en la suave red de su chinchorro de finas cuerdas de moriche

— Bolívar Coronado, El llanero

== The llanero ==
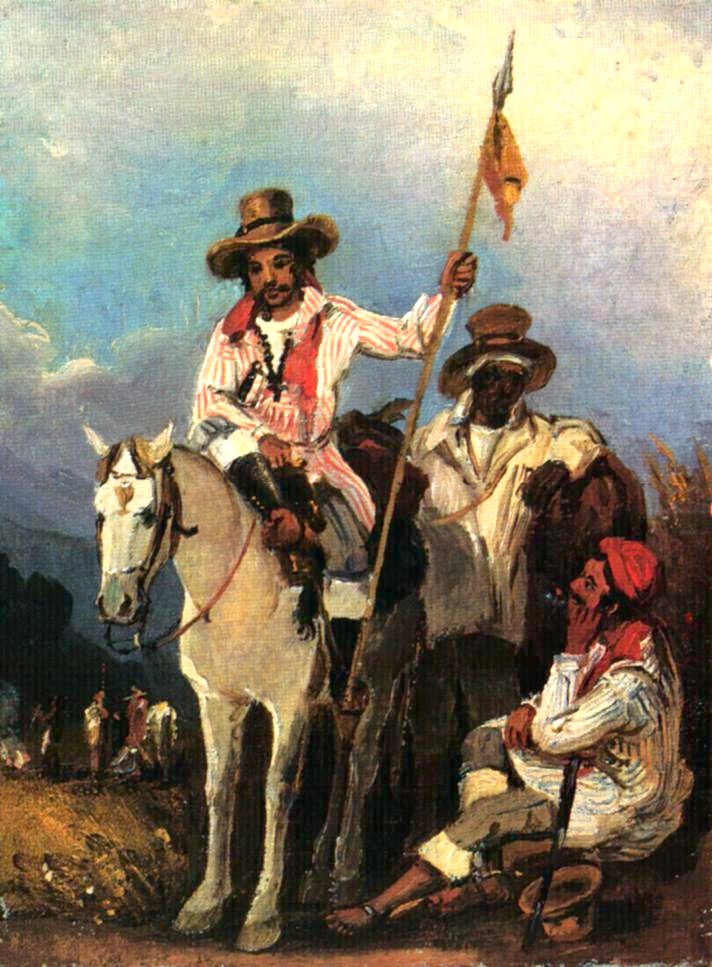
Llaneros, painting by Ferdinand Bellermann (1843)

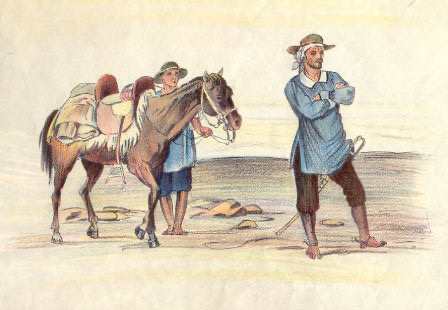
A Llanero soldier by Ramón Torres Méndez

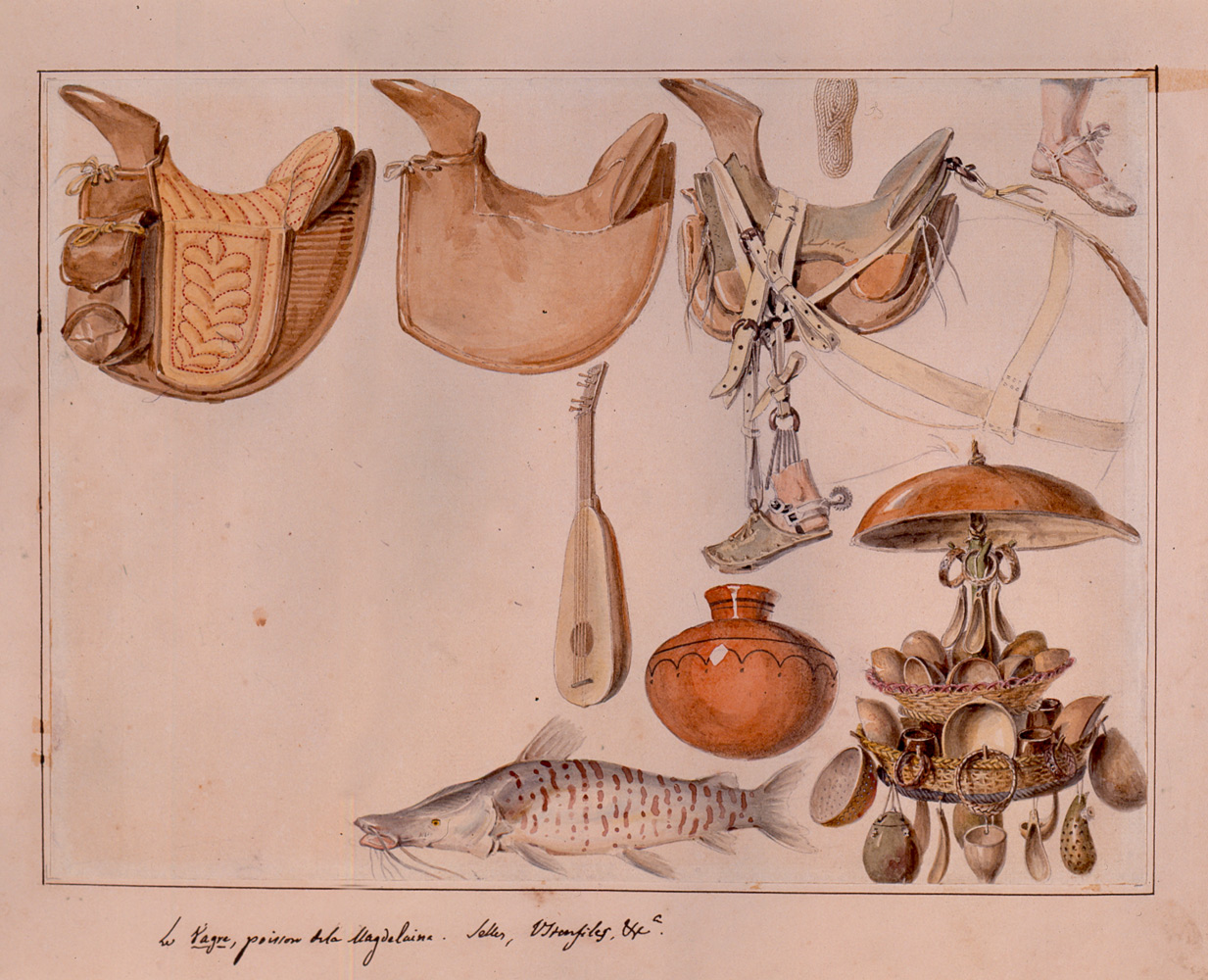
Saddle and utensils of the region, François Désiré Roulin, 1823.

In the beginning, these riders lived in a semi-nomadic way, being hired by different herds to carry out their tasks; in these journeys there was always a cook, a doctor, and a physician apart from the team of cabresteros and baquianos. They practiced fishing, hunting, bartering, and trading with each other. Due to the hostile flora and fauna of the plain, these adapted to combat it, so it was frequent the taming of alligators, bulls and pimps with their different utensils such as rope and knife. Tall in stature, lean bodies and strong muscles, adapted to the tropical climate. According to Ramón Páez, the llanero had several physical characteristics that resembled the Arabic one. Bolívar Coronado said

La amada, o la querida, o la esposa, el caballo y la guitarra: he aquí los dioses del llanero

— Bolívar Coronado, El llanero

Always on horseback, sober, haughty and extremely manly. Black coffee drinker and chimó chewer, a kind of tobacco. The llanero did both the male and female tasks. The great terrain of the plain forced them to be versatile when working so we have not only the cabresteros, but the cheese makers, saddlers, bongueros and vegueros, each of them doing tasks that would be considered feminine for the time.

Sobre la paja, la palma; sobre la palma, los cielos; sobre mi caballo, yo, y sobre mi, mi sombrero

— A llanero poem

His way of riding a horse is different from that of his American companions. Ramón Páez in his book Wild Scenes in South America; or Life in the Venezuelan Llanos makes two observations about the way of riding of these riders

Just like among the Arabs, riders never put their foot fully into the stirrups, and only hold on with their big toes to quickly get rid of them in the event of a fall. This continued habit of riding, arches the legs and feet in a characteristic way, and accredits them fame of good horsemen

— Ramón Páez, Wild Scenes in South America; or Life in the Venezuelan Llanos

Very few people in the world are better riders than the Llaneros of Venezuela, excepting perhaps the Gauchos of Buenos Aires, equally skilled than these in their dexterity where they show beautiful feats in horsemanship, due to their work in the field of which they are accustomed since childhood. Their horses, moreover, are so well adapted to the different tasks of their profession that beast and man seem to be the same being.

— Ramón Páez, Wild Scenes in South America; or Life in the Venezuelan Llanos

== Participation in the wars of independence ==
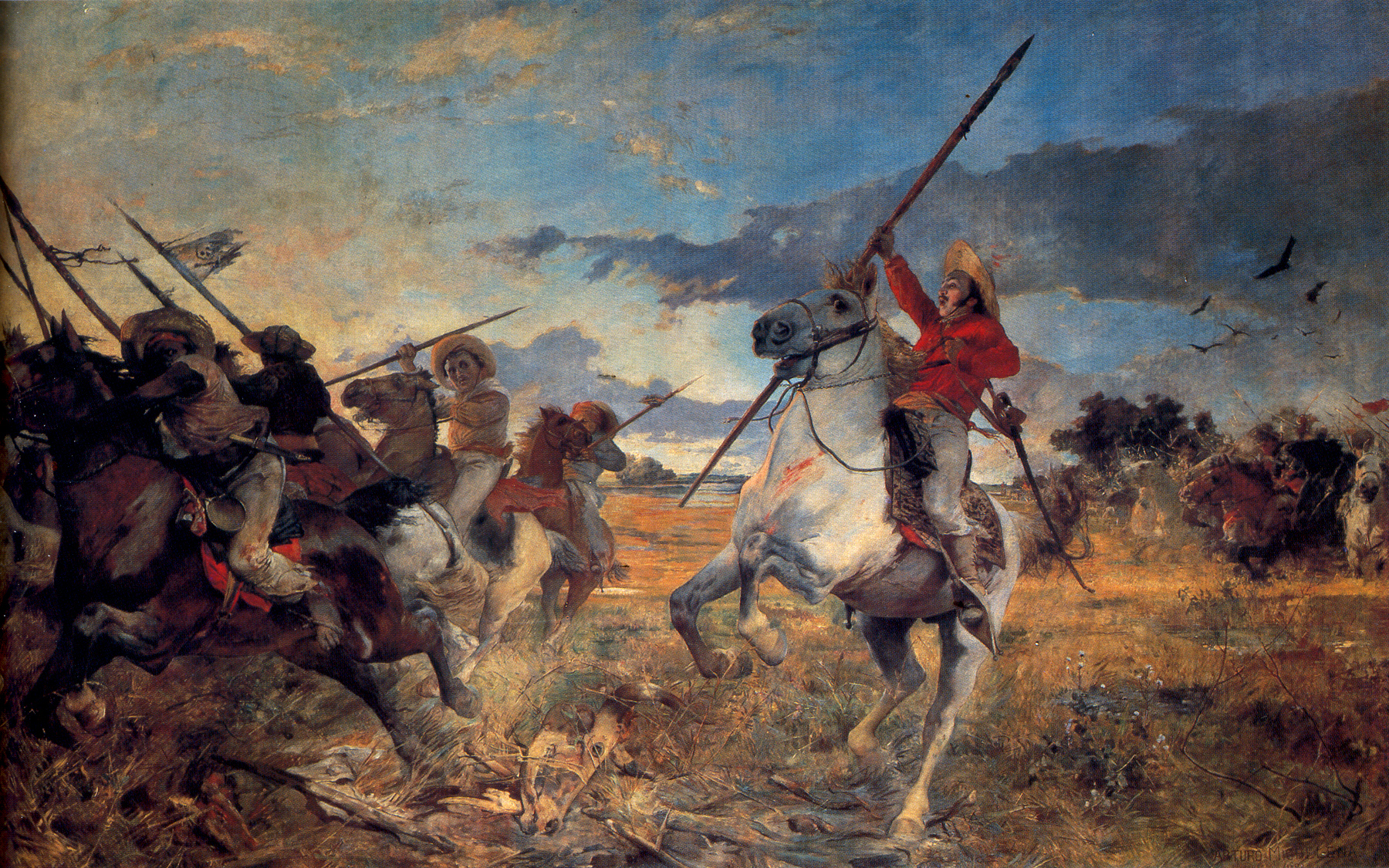
Arturo Michelena, Vuelvan Caras. At the Battle of Las Queseras del Medio, José Antonio Páez ordered his Llaneros to turn and attack the pursuing Spanish cavalry.

At the beginning of the independence process, the plains were an indispensable region due to its rich livestock and agricultural resources, and for having above all many strong, fast, disciplined riders, accustomed to a harsh environment.

The plains (as the Andes), due to its difficulty of transportation, were an abandoned area compared to the others in the Captaincy General of Venezuela, this caused its inhabitants to develop their own way of life apart from the rest of the population, with their own codes, but it was also a canton with many qualities that would be used by the different Caudillos on duty to raise montoneras.

The lion of the Llanos, José Tomás Boves, taking advantage of the precarious situation of the peons of the field of the plain, made a large part of the llaneros join the Royalist Army, under the idea of the exploitation of the Mantuanos towards the llaneros. The main causes of the union of the llaneros with Boves was the repression made by the republicans towards them, the capture of black maroons who had escaped in the skirmish of the First Republic, the recruited peons and slaves, among others. All this had as a reaction a complete rejection in this land towards the republic.

Boves, under a pirate flag as the main banner and a montonera made up mainly of lancers, started his participation in the dissolution of the Second Republic. Participating in different campaigns and battles such as the Campaign of the Valleys of Aragua and El Tuy, the Second Battle de la Puerta, the Siege of Valencia and the emigration to the East until achieving the dissolution of the Second Republic and commanding its own militia made up of thousands of llaneros.

The fall of the Second Republic brought with it several consequences for the population. Several of the promises made to the llaneros were not kept. Various charges were removed from different pardos and llaneros that were decorated by Boves and Monteverde. The prohibition of looting, and the fear of losing autonomy in their regions by the royalists led several troops to desert the Royalist Army. In some regions the war was constant for five, ten or even fifteen years and the only authority that could be used for protection during and after the conflict was the Caudillo whose dominion was thus legitimized; that is why after independence a stage of wars between rival chiefs was ready. As the Portuguese Joaquim Pedro de Oliveira Martins (1845-1894) said about the Iberian devotio

Neither Boves nor Morillo managed to achieve the dominance of the llaneros, they were men like General José Antonio Páez, Manuel Cedeño, José Gregorio Monagas, José Antonio Anzoátegui, Francisco de Paula Santander, Ramón Nonato Pérez, Juan Ángel Bravo, Juan Mellado, Manuel Camacaro, Juan Nepomuceno Moreno and the Liberator Simón Bolívar (the Llaneros called him culo de hierro – or "iron buttocks" – for his endurance on horseback). Those who in the end would get the llanero's sympathy for their cause.

Páez, el centauro de los Llanos, the clarified citizen or the Taita was a man of the people, of humble and Canarian origin but above all llanero; Raised as one to become an excellent spearman, cabrestero, baquiano and leader, he made an image in the plain until he became caporal. The precarious situation of the plain and its inhabitants led to his companions persuading him to enter the Ejercito libertador. Due to his character and being someone for and for the people, it was not difficult for him to raise people in arms, reaching not only to command his own montonera, but to an entire country. Becoming not only the first Llanero president of Venezuela, but also one of the few cowboy presidents that history has seen. Contrary to Boves, Páez did not raise the llaneros based on their hatred, but based on their needs, first freeing them from Spanish rule and then the future Bogotá oligarchy. Bolívar Coronado points out that

Sea que estuviesen oprimidos por el coronel Gonzalo de Orozco, que era el encargado general de Rodríguez, sea porque éste apoyaba en todo las trapacerías y atentados contra los intereses y contra el honor de los colindantes, cometidos a diario por Miguel López, es lo cierto que aquella noche estalló el alzamiento. El futuro general, Páez, que, aun siendo ya caporal en el Hato de la Calzada, estaba muy a disgusto con sus superiores, hizo causa, con los sediciosos, y a la hora que se formó el alboroto fue él el primero en levantarse, tomar la lanza y dirigirse al lugar donde la negrada daba gritos y hacía gestos de rebelión

— Bolívar Coronado, El llanero

The Braves of Apure or the Páez lancers, an army of llaneros made up of all classes, including the Negro Primero, a black maroon turned llanero of great caliber, were crucial in several battles, such as that of Las Queseras del Medio, in which 153 Paez llaneros lancers under the tactic "Vuelvan Caras" defeated with only 2 deaths 1,200 Spanish riders, giving a quantity of 400 casualties to the royalist side. The llaneros were also of vital importance in the campaigns of Urica, Swamp of Vargas, Boyacá, the batlle of Junín, the battle of Ayacucho and Carabobo, which were decisive for the republican side.

== Journey to the old llano ==
Llanero are divided into four types: the Cabrestero, the Baquiano, the Cuatrero and the Musician.

- Cabrestero: rider who leads the cattle by means of the halters.
- Baquiano: rider who knows the ways, shortcuts, language, and customs of a region. It acts as a guide to travel through them.
- Cuatrero: rider thief of herds or cattle.
- Musician: rider, composer, and singer of the plain. He usually plays either the cuatro, harp, maraca, bandola, or violin.

The large crossings between herds to transport livestock are extremely rigorous and demanding. These cabresteros and baquianos guide thousands or hundreds of cattle through the immense plains because the railroad had not yet been introduced in that region (they still do not have a railroad). Each beef being marked according to the membership herd. Thanks to Bolívar Coronado we have several brands of cattle belonging to various herds of the 18th century, such as those of Evangelina López and Pedro Fraile. The cattle were not in bars, so the only way to differentiate them was with the brand. To mark the ear, the llaneros used the so-called fork, with various shapes. One of them was to slit the ear of the cattle in several ways.

These caravans, which are very reminiscent of the eastern one, were commanded by the cabrestero, among them and of equal importance, was the cook, the doctor, a physicist, and obviously the different cowboys and baquianos. Unlike cattle in North America or Europe, that of the plains was not accustomed to human contact due to not being wired, which made the herding more complicated. If a large river blocks their way, they have to guide the herd and the cattle to pass this current; the bonguero, with his bongo -type of canoe- transported the merchandise and some llaneros. The cowboys and the cabrestero sank into the water and led the cattle and beasts through the stream. Always taking care of the deadly piranhas and alligators that inhabit these waters, thanks to the stampedes, they usually did not approach these transfers, but from time to time an alligator was seen blocking the path, so the llaneros, armed with a knife and his falseta, had to sank underwater to catch the alligator and get it out of the way. If the piranhas reached these waters, the only option was to escape as quickly as possible, due to how fierce and dangerous they are. This river crossing took several hours. At the end of the day, after eating, they took out their hammocks and put them on the available palm trees or trees, where these cowboys could rest quietly. If there were no logs nearby, they used the blanket and hammock for a kind of makeshift bed. If they had the opportunity and the fortune to find a pulpería -kind of hotel and groceries store-, they rested in those facilities thanks to the kindness of their owners. The quality of the pulperías or hato varied a lot, going from some quite gloomy or others quite adapted to the tasks of the field.

== Creatures of the plains ==
=== Venezuelan creole horse ===
The region features a diverse range of flora and fauna. Livestock are allowed to graze freely in open pastures until reaching maturity, at which point they are brought in for domestication and training.

Each horse or padrote has a particular name that distinguishes it from the rest and shows the owner's affection towards it. Here are some: Lancero, Banderita, Guapetón, Corozo, Esmeralda, Cacique, Pluza de Garza, Bayoneta, Lucero, Torito, Bellaco, Caney, among others.

For the llanero, the horse is par excellence a beast. Other animals are not beasts for the llanero. Like cattle, it is only beef. Pigs are herds.

For their dressage, a team of llaneros armed with lassos, they scurry and strongly immobilize the legs of the stallion with their lassos, another llanero arrives and rides on top of the beast, cuts off part of the mane to show that it has been tamed and grabs what remains, the ranger gives the Order and the others remove their lassos, the beast, being accustomed to the freedom of the plain, will try with all its might to take off the tamer, kicking and with several jumps, until in the end, the beast is defeated, and is tamed by the llanero.

The horse is the llanero's best friend, so much so that they even have poems like these

My wife and my horse

They died at once; What woman, what demon,

My horse is what I feel

— A llanero poem

=== Animals ===
Alligators, caribs, babas, eels, wild pigs, bulls and jaguars are animals native to the region. The alligator was hunted as a game and also for being an obstacle, usually with the falseta it is immobilized, but its skin, being so hard and resistant, it has to be nailed with the knife at specific points such as under the legs. Eels, capable of killing a stallion, are a real danger, the hunting method is to use a horse as a hook, when passing through the river, the horse would be attacked by the eels until it was immobilized. Upon revealing their position, the llaneros would hunt them down, and the other eels flee the field to make way for the riders and cattle, and the horse recovers instantly, with no repercussions from the incident.

== Bahareque ==
Bahareque is the general name given to the construction system of certain types of houses in Colombia and Venezuela. The bahareques have generally been the type of dwelling for the llanero. The roof is casupo, a long leaf that is placed superimposed like tiles and is tied with a meccatillo. Those leaves are dried and toasted by the sun, it is a totally waterproof and cool roof. Its bahareque walls are made by opening a hole in the ground and there is a lot of wet mud put in it, a lot of straw cut into small pieces is added to it and a few men get into the hole to step on the mud until it is well mixed. Previously a frame is made with sticks and verada. For the walls, the mud is thrown until filling the spaces of the frame. The bahareque is very cool, it is ideal for the climate of the plain. Its patterns always follow rectangular shapes; It is also used for internal furniture, made entirely from the materials available on site. The external branches attached to the bahareque are called caney.

== Llanero culture ==
Cattle form an important part of Llanero culture. There are 12 million cattle on the llano. During the year, the Llaneros have to drive cattle great distances. During the winter wet season, the Llaneros have to drive the cattle to higher ground as the poor drainage of the plains means that the annual floods are extensive. Conversely, they have to drive the cattle towards wet areas during the dry summer.

The Llaneros show their skills in coleo competitions, similar to rodeos, where they compete to drag cattle to the ground.

Llanero music is distinctive for its use of the harp, the maracas and a small guitar called a cuatro. The joropo, a Llanero dance, has become the national dance of Venezuela, and of the Llanos of Colombia. While Llanero music is relatively unknown outside of Colombia and Venezuela, the musical groups Los Llaneros and Cimarrón have toured throughout the world.

Llanero cuisine is based on meat, fish, chicken, chiguire meat (also known as capybara), rice, arepas, and other starches, although wheat is not used. Llanero Ken, a doll dressed in the distinctive Llanero costume liqui liqui, including a customary starched hat, has become a popular doll in Venezuela.

== North American usage ==
The Spanish also used the term to describe the nomadic tribes of the Llano Estacado of Texas and New Mexico and was applied to the Apache in particular.

In Spanish, The Lone Ranger is known as El Llanero Solitario.

== See also ==
- Chagra (Ecuador)
- Charro (Mexican cowboy, nomad and bandolero)
- Cowboy (Mexico and United States)
- Gaucho (Argentina, Brasil, Paraguay and Uruguay)
- Guajiro (Cuba)
- Huaso (Chile)
- Jíbaro (Puerto Rico)
- Lancero
- Morochuco (Peruvian Andes)
- Piajeno (north coast mule rider of Peru: Piura and Lambayeque)
