= Portuguesa River =

Coordinates: 7.9381°N 67.5389°W

Location
- Country: Venezuela

Physical characteristics
- Mouth
  - location: Apure River
- Length: 600 km (370 mi)
- Basin size: 80,000 km^{2} (31,000 sq mi)

The Portuguesa River (Spanish: Río Portuguesa, also Río la Portuguesa, Río de la Portuguesa) is a river of Venezuela. It is part of the Orinoco River basin, and is a tributary of the Apure River (which is, in turn, a tributary of the Orinoco).

Legend has it that the river's name originated from a woman from Portugal who drowned in its waters. In turn, the river's name is the origin of the name of the Venezuelan state of Portuguesa.

== See also ==
- List of rivers of Venezuela
