= Nabel Martins =

Venezuelan-Portuguese fashion designer

- Martins in her studio in Paris, 2025
- Born: Venezuela
- Education: Instituto de Moda Brivil, Caracas; Central Saint Martins, London
- Years active: 2013–present
- Label: Nabel Martins
- Website: nabelmartins.com

Nabel Martins is a Venezuelan-Portuguese fashion designer known for her eponymous fashion label.

== Early life and education ==
Born in Venezuela, to a Portuguese father and a Venezuelan mother, she studied fashion design at the Instituto de Diseño y Moda Brivil in Caracas and later specialized in fashion marketing at Central Saint Martins in London.

== Career ==
Martins launched her eponymous fashion label in 2013, establishing her atelier in Caracas.

Since 2022, she has regularly showcased her collections during Paris Fashion Week. She has also presented in different countries in Central America and Europe through trunk shows.. In 2024, she was invited by the Venezuelan delegation to UNESCO in Paris on the occasion of Latin America and Caribbean Week. As part of the event, Martins presented a reinterpretation of the 'Liqui Liqui', Venezuela’s traditional formal attire.

Martins presented her Spring–Summer 2026 collection, Alegoría, with a runway show at the historic Hacienda La Vega in Caracas, Venezuela, a venue that had previously hosted a Christian Dior fashion show in 1953.. The collection was described as reflecting her “New Classic” approach, focused on timeless and feminine design.
