= Guayana natural region =

Geographic region of Venezuela

Guayana natural region Región natural de Guayana
- Geographic/natural region
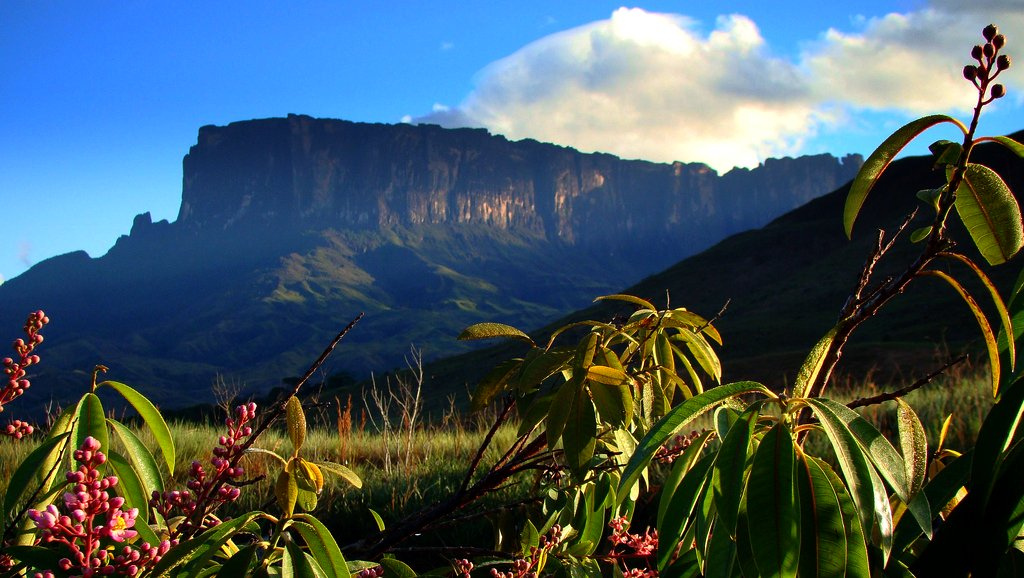

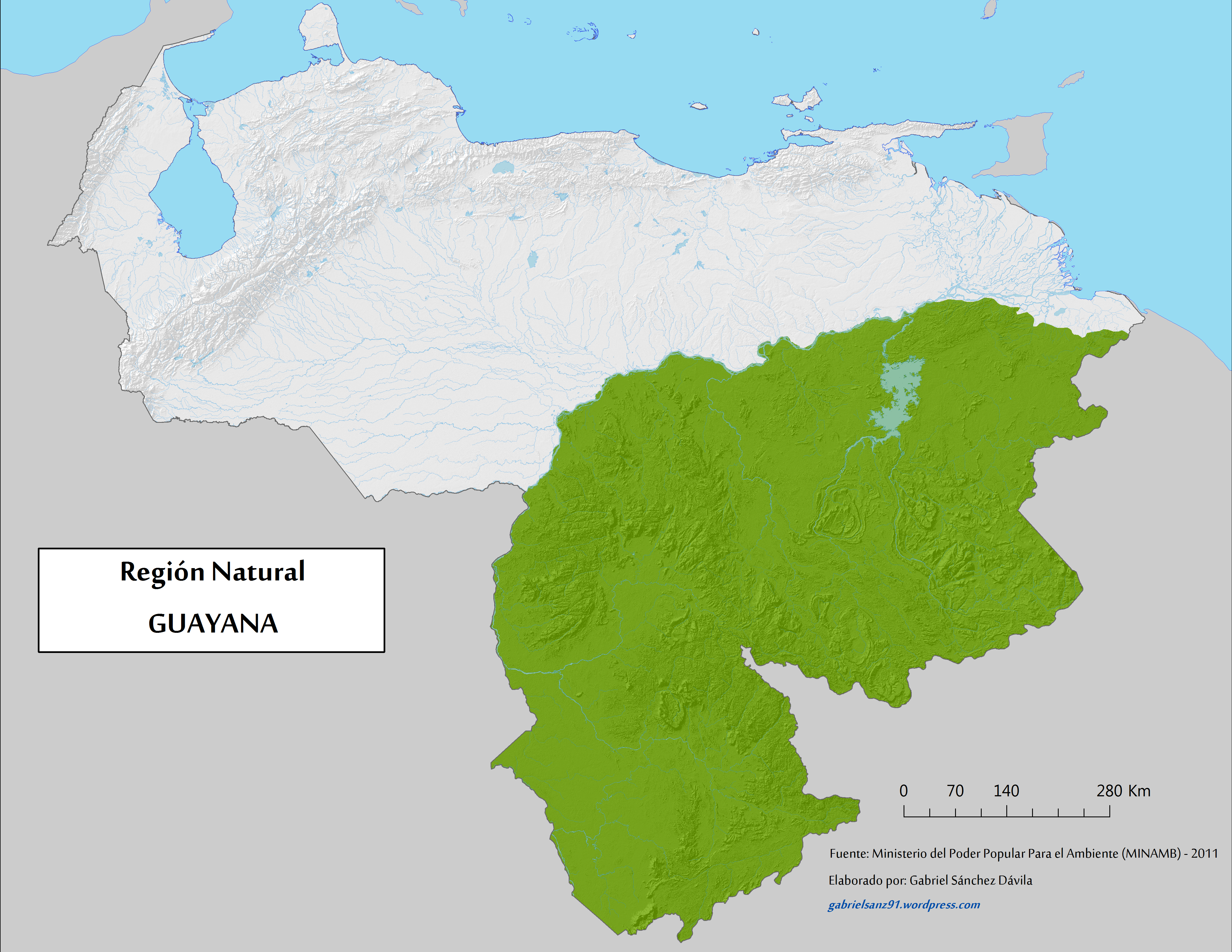
- Geographic map of Guayana natural region.
- Coordinates: 3°N 63°W
- Country: Venezuela
- State: Amazonas
- Region: Guiana Shield

Area
  - Total: 441,726 km^{2} (170,551 sq mi)

The Guayana natural region (Spanish: Región natural de Guayana), also simply known as Guayana (English: Guiana) in Venezuela, is a large massif of approximately 441,726 km^{2} (170,551 sq mi) area, equivalent to 48.2% of the total continental territory of the country.

It is on the geological Guiana Shield craton, and is the Venezuelan part of the biogeographic Guayana Highlands and their tepuis (mesas).

Its limits by the north and east are formed by the route of the rivers Orinoco, Atabapo and Negro Rivers; and by the south the borders with Brazil.

The region occupies almost half of the territory of Venezuela.

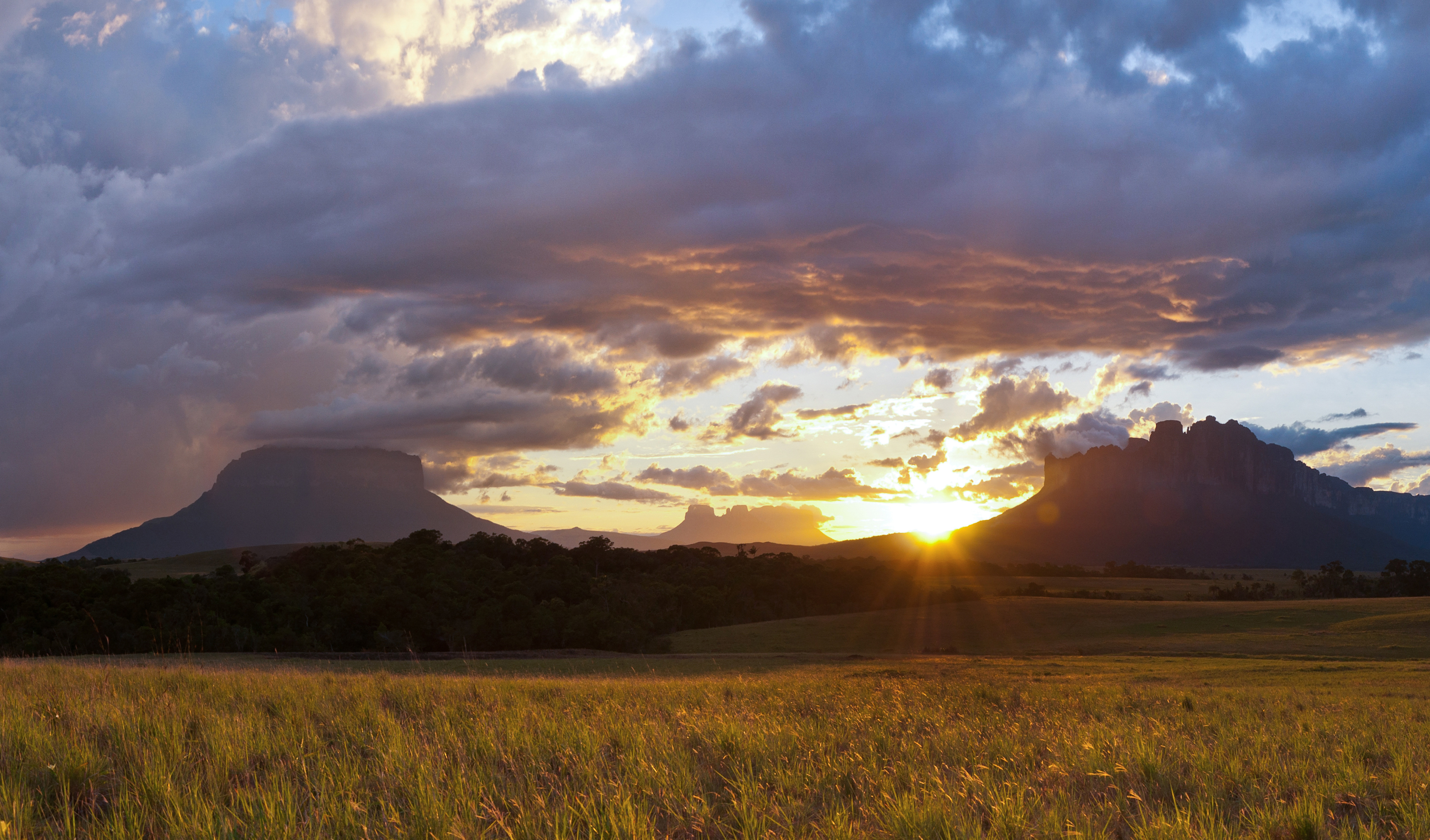
Macizo de Chimantá, Guayana Region

== Relief ==
The relief of the southern Orinoco or Guiana is very varied, plains or savannahs, with heights ranging from 100 to 500 m (330 to 1,640 ft) above sea level, including the Gran Sabana, which is a plain with an average of 1,000 m (3,300 ft) above sea level, home to the magnificent tepuis, and finally the sierras or mountain ranges that reach considerable peaks of up to 3,800 m (12,500 ft) above sea level.

== Climate ==
The climate is tropical, although it varies according to the zones; thus, the low areas present high temperatures, which reach 27 °C (81 °F) on average, and abundant rainfall. Depending on the altitude, which is varied, there is a diversity of climates, from torrid to very mild, to the cool climate of the tepui and mountain peaks. The tropical climate has three types depending on the habitat: tropical rain forest without a dry season; tropical monsoon transitional climate with a very short dry season and tropical savannah with a dry season between December and March. The high cloudiness between the dry season facilitates the formation of water vapor that compensates for the lack of rain. The trade winds that blow from the northeast provide rainfall over the highlands. Due to its proximity to the equator, the area's sunshine can be considered constant throughout the year.

== Hydrography ==
This region has one of the largest water reserves in the world, the confluence of the Orinoco and the Caroní, and is one of the four largest water basins in the world. The state is crossed by numerous rivers, among them the Lower Orinoco, with its main tributary the Caroní, Ocamo, Cunucunuma, Suapure, Cuyuní, Yuruari, these are tributaries of the great river.

== Geomorphology ==
There are extensions of massifs and tepuis (unique rock formations in the world) that have continuity with the orography of the Venezuelan Guiana. The oldest geological formations on the planet are found there, as well as one of the most important biodiversity reserves in the world. Among the extraordinary geological formations, the Roraima, with its 2,810 m (9,220 ft) above sea level, and the Auyantepui, where the world's highest waterfall, Angel Falls, with its almost 1,000 m (3,300 ft) of vertical drop, stand out for their height. The Guiana Shield occupies the southern region of the Orinoco River and the northern region of the Amazon River, between the plains of Colombia and Venezuela and the Atlantic Ocean. It covers the whole south of Venezuela and the south of the Orinoco. It has the oldest rocks in the country.

There are archaic rocks with more than 3,000 million years. This type of rock is found just south of the Orinoco around Ciudad Bolivar and Ciudad Guayana.

== Soil ==
The type of soil in this region is very varied. In the north, along the entire strip of the southern basin of the Orinoco River, the soils are poor in nutrients and have been developed basically for industrial use, raising cattle for fattening and as urban settlements. To the south, the soils are highly mineralized and rich in large deposits of iron, bauxite, among other important minerals and large natural reserves.

== Vegetation ==
Due to its immense extension, the vegetation of the region is a sample of all the vegetation that covers the Venezuelan ground; throughout its ample geography is halophilic vegetation, which is the typical one of the mangroves; herbaceous vegetation of the savannahs; xerophyte, that is that of the thorn or xerophilic forest; the hydrophilic one of the forests and the own one of the cloud forest, own of the mountainous slopes.

== Economic activities ==
Because of its tremendous hydroelectric potential, mineral wealth, abundance of iron ore and bauxite, one of the main heavy industries in Latin America has been installed. In fact, the Siderurgica del Orinoco is the main API pipe factory in Latin America and should also be considered the aluminum industry and others derived from steel and aluminum processing. Other important minerals in the region are nickel, manganese and mercury. There are also significant amounts of precious metals, (gold and platinum) and diamonds that have brought many adventurers who use unorthodox methods for their extraction, without caring about the ecological damage they cause to rivers and the environment.

== Gallery ==
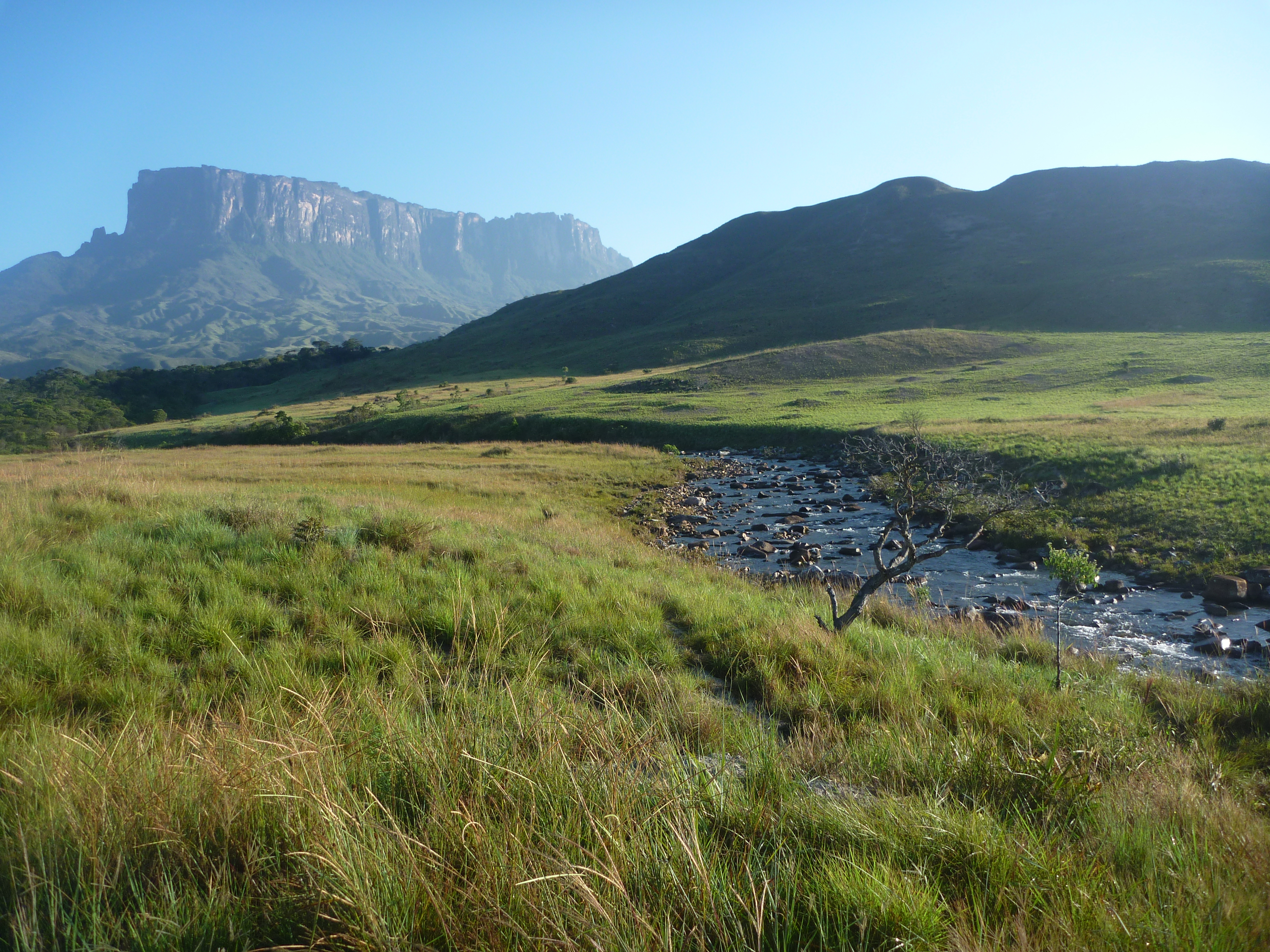
Tek River, Guayana Region

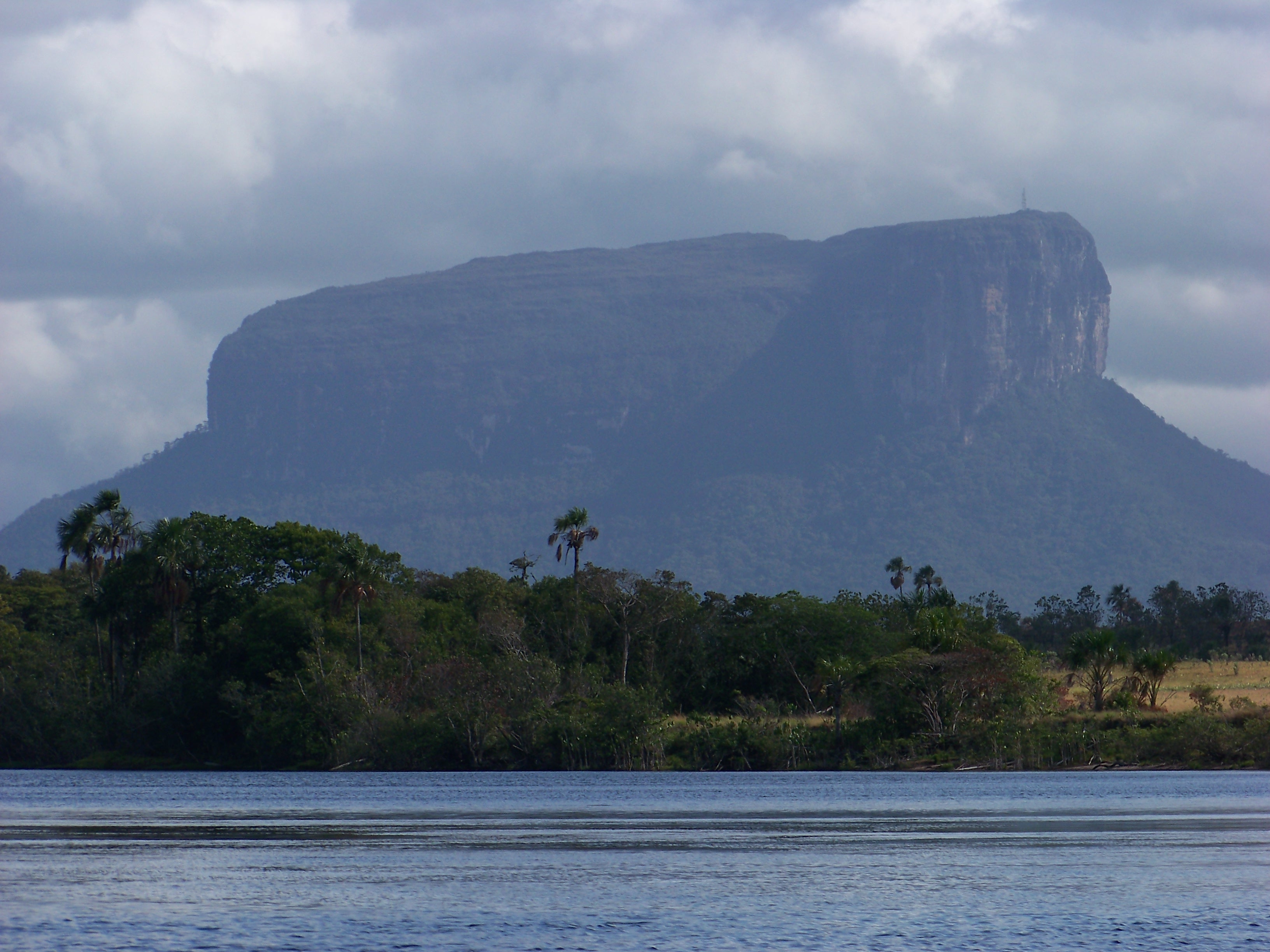
Cerro Venado, Canaima National Park

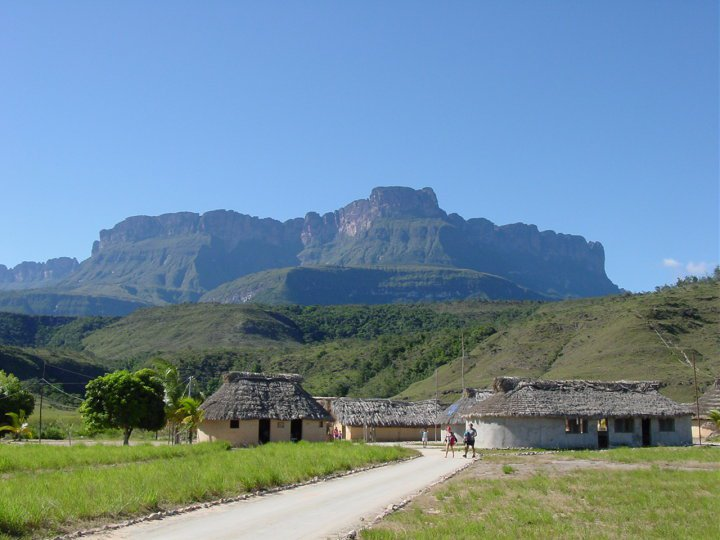
Kavac, Bolívar State

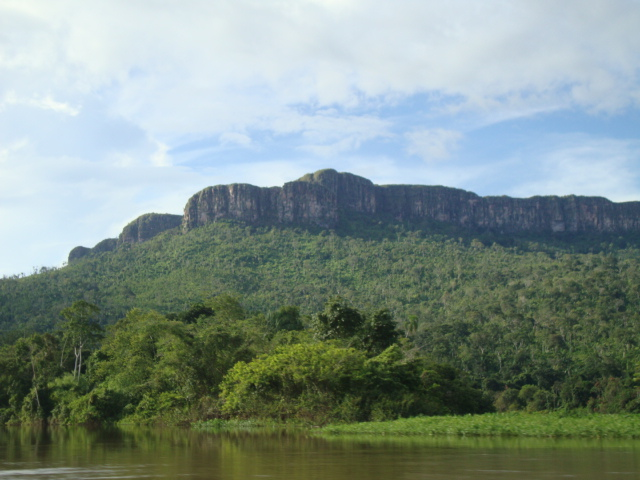
Cerro Maweti, Amazonas State (Venezuela)

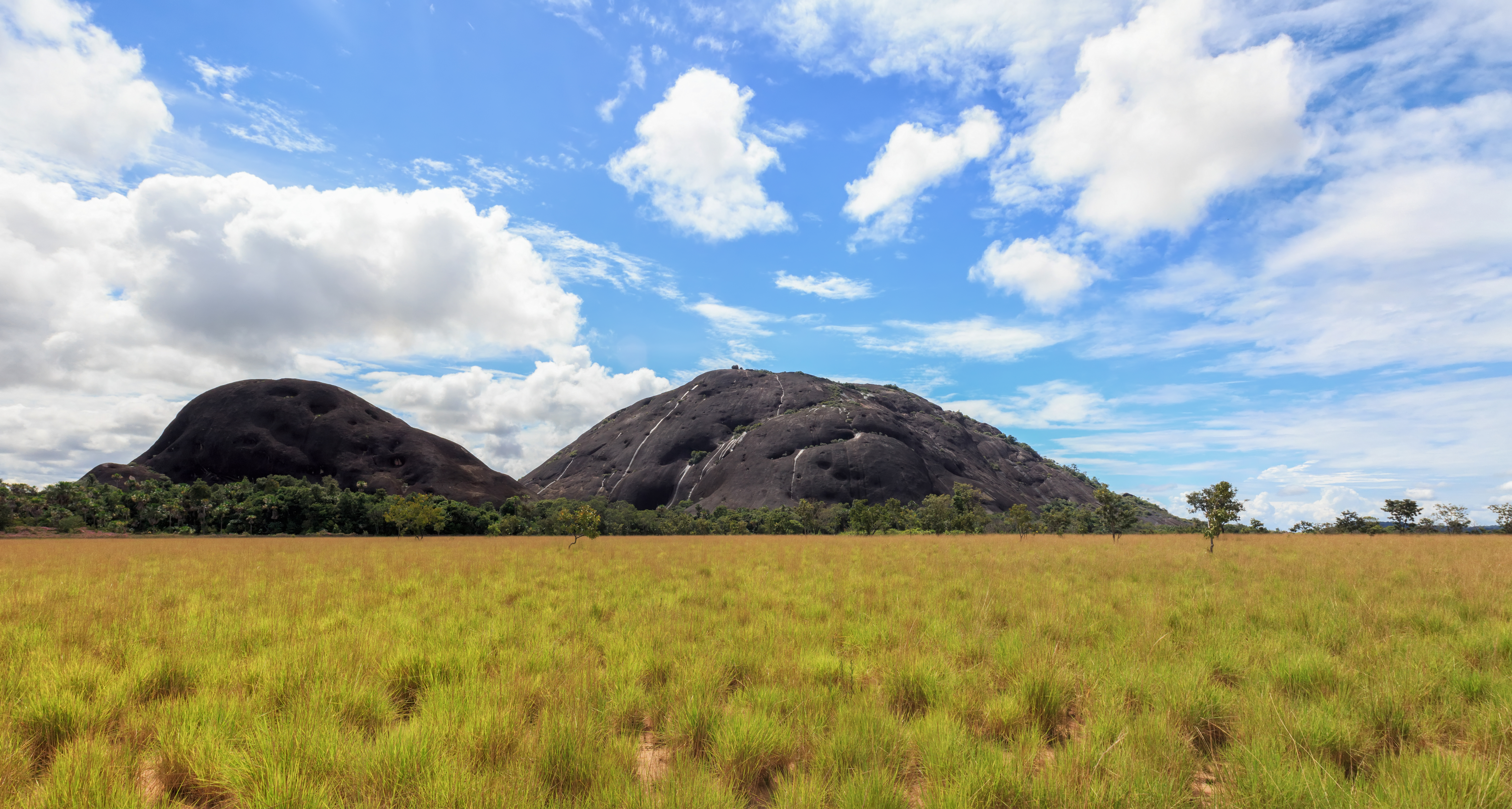
Piedra La Tortuga Natural Monument

== See also ==
- Guayana Highlands topics
- Ecoregions of Venezuela
- Guiana Shield
