= San Francisco Municipality =

San Francisco Municipality may refer to:

- San Francisco, Cundinamarca, Colombia
- San Francisco, Putumayo, Colombia
- San Francisco, El Petén, Guatemala
- San Francisco, Atlántida, Honduras
- San Francisco, Lempira, Honduras
- San Francisco, Cebu, Philippines
- San Francisco, Southern Leyte, Philippines
- San Francisco Municipality, Falcón in Falcón, Venezuela
- San Francisco Municipality, Zulia in Zulia, Venezuela
