= Cacique Manaure =

Municipality of Falcón State, Venezuela

- Municipality
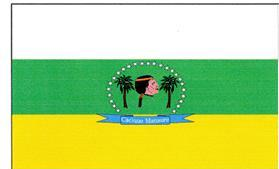
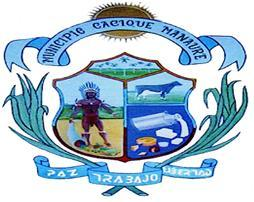
- Flag Coat of arms

- Location of Manaure Municipality

- Location within Venezuela
- Coordinates: 10°58′16″N 68°32′40″W
- Country: Venezuela
- State: Falcón
- Established: June 28, 1989
- Parish: 1

Government
  - Mayor: Ángel Henríquez (MUD)

Area
  - Total: 190 km^{2} (73 sq mi)
- Elevation: 44 m (144 ft)

Population (2011)
  - Total: 10,874
  - Density: 57/km^{2} (150/sq mi)
- Demonym: Manaurense
- Time zone: UTC-4 (VET)

Cacique Manaure Municipality is one of the 25 municipalities that make up the Falcón State of Venezuela. Its seat of government is located in Yaracal. The municipality has an area of 190 square kilometers, and a population of 11,299 as of the year 2019. It has only one parish.

The municipality owes its name to Cacique Manaure, the chief of the Caquetio people who inhabited the area at the time of colonization of the Americas. He was later baptized in 1527.

Cacique Manaure Municipality was part of the Acosta District until 1993.

== Geography ==
The municipality is located in the eastern part of Falcón, in a flat region formed by the depression of the Tocuyo River. It shares a border with San Francisco in the north, Acosta in the east, Monseñor Iturriza in the south, and Jacura in the west. It has an average elevation of 44 meters above the sea level.

== Politic and government ==
=== Mayors ===
Period	Mayor	Political Party / Alliance	Percent of votes	Note
1989 - 1992	Castor Oriol López Delmoral	COPEI	64.50	First mayor under direct elections
1992 - 1995	Castor Oriol López Delmoral	COPEI	65.86	Reelected
1995 - 2000	Ali Hernandez	COPEI	N/A	Second mayor under direct elections
2000 - 2004	Ángel Henríquez	AD	30.56	Third mayor under direct elections
2004 - 2008	Ángel Henríquez	AD	53.16	Reelected
2008 - 2013	Dimaris de Henríquez	AD	39.77	Fourth mayor under direct elections
2013 - 2017	Francisco Barletta	PSUV	45.77	Fifth mayor under direct elections
2017 - 2021	luis Ulacio	PSUV	77.97	Sixth mayor under direct elections
2021 - 2025	Ángel Henríquez	MUD	68.61	Seventh mayor under direct elections

=== City Council ===
Period of 1989 - 1992

Councilors:	Political parties / Alliance
Dilme Rodríguez	COPEI
Juan Caraballo	COPEI
Dorcas de Meléndez	COPEI
Antonio Salas	AD
Nelly Cordero de Henriquez	AD

Period of 1992 - 1995

Councilors:	Political parties / Alliance
Juan Caraballo	COPEI
Nelly Cordero de Henriquez	COPEI
Argenis Arteaga	COPEI
Julio Chirinos	AD
Rafael Sánchez	MAS

Period of 1995 - 2000

Councilors:	Political parties / Alliance
Juan Caraballo	COPEI
Orson Alian Uscategui	COPEI
Argenis Arteaga	COPEI
Saul Alberto Pereira	AD
Nelly Mujica	CONVERGENCIA

Period of 2013 - 2018

Councilors	Political parties / Alliance
César Peña	PSUV
José Vargas	PSUV
Carlos García	PSUV
Gustavo Ladino	PSUV
José Molina	MAS

Period of 2018 - 2021

Councilors	Political parties / Alliance
Emily López	PSUV
Gustavo Ladino	PSUV
José Vargas	PSUV
Andres Fonceca	PSUV
Yorki Aguilar	PSUV

Period of 2021 - 2025

Councilors	Political parties / Alliance
Juan Escubina	MUD
Tatiana Reyes	MUD
Nancy Velazquez	MUD
Alonso Rodríguez	MUD
Norquis Ladino	PSUV

== See also ==
- Municipalities of Venezuela
- Falcón
- Venezuela
