= Universidad de Falcón =

Private university in Punto Fijo, Falcón State, Venezuela

- Type: Private
- Established: 2004
- Location: Punto Fijo, Falcón, Venezuela
- Website: www.udefa.edu.ve

Universidad de Falcón is a private university located in the city of Punto Fijo, Falcón State, Venezuela.

== History ==
Began operations in 2004 following the approval by the National Council of Universities (CNU) and Higher Education Institution private, according to Resolution No. 283 published in Official Gazette of the Bolivarian Republic of Venezuela No. 37.852 7 January 2004.

Academic activities are initiated in June 2004 for the period 2004-I, between June and October. At that time the university opens with an enrollment of 170 students.

== Faculties ==
At present there are four faculties:

- Electronic Engineering, Faculty of Engineering
- Environmental Engineering, Faculty of Agriculture and Marine Sciences
- Bachelor in Tourism, Faculty of Social Sciences
- Process Management, Faculty of Social Sciences
- Law, Faculty of Law and Political Science
