= Punta Cardón =

- Town
- Location within Venezuela
- Coordinates: 11.6508°N 70.2156°W
- Country: Venezuela
- State: Falcón
- Municipality: Carirubana
- Time zone: UTC -4:30
- Postal code: 4154
- Climate: BWh

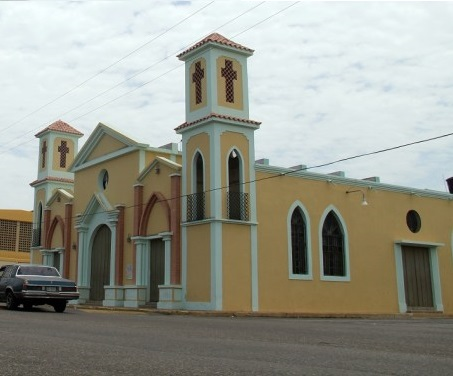
Image of a church in the town

Paraguaná Zoological Park

Punta Cardón is a town and parish in the Carirubana autonomous municipality of Falcón state, Venezuela.

The town was once a poor fishing community on the Gulf of Coro on the northwest coast of Venezuela. Since the mid-1940s the community has become surrounded by the Paraguana- oil-refining complex, which today is run by PDVSA, the state oil company. The Spanish architect José Lino Vaamonde built the Club Manaure in Punta Cardón (1953) for Shell Venezuela.

== Sources ==
- Canino, Maria Victoria; Stronen, Iselin Asedotter (2015-06-11), "Oil and environmental injustice in Venezuela: An ethnographic study of Punta Cardon", Contested Powers: The Politics of Energy and Development in Latin America, Zed Books Ltd., ISBN 978-1-78360-095-3
- González Casas, Lorenzo; Vicente Garrido, Henry (2010), Mundos que se desvanecen: el exilio arquitectónico español en Venezuela. (in Spanish), Universidade de Santiago de Compostela, Centro Interdisciplinario de Estudios Americanistas
