= Punto Fijo =

- City
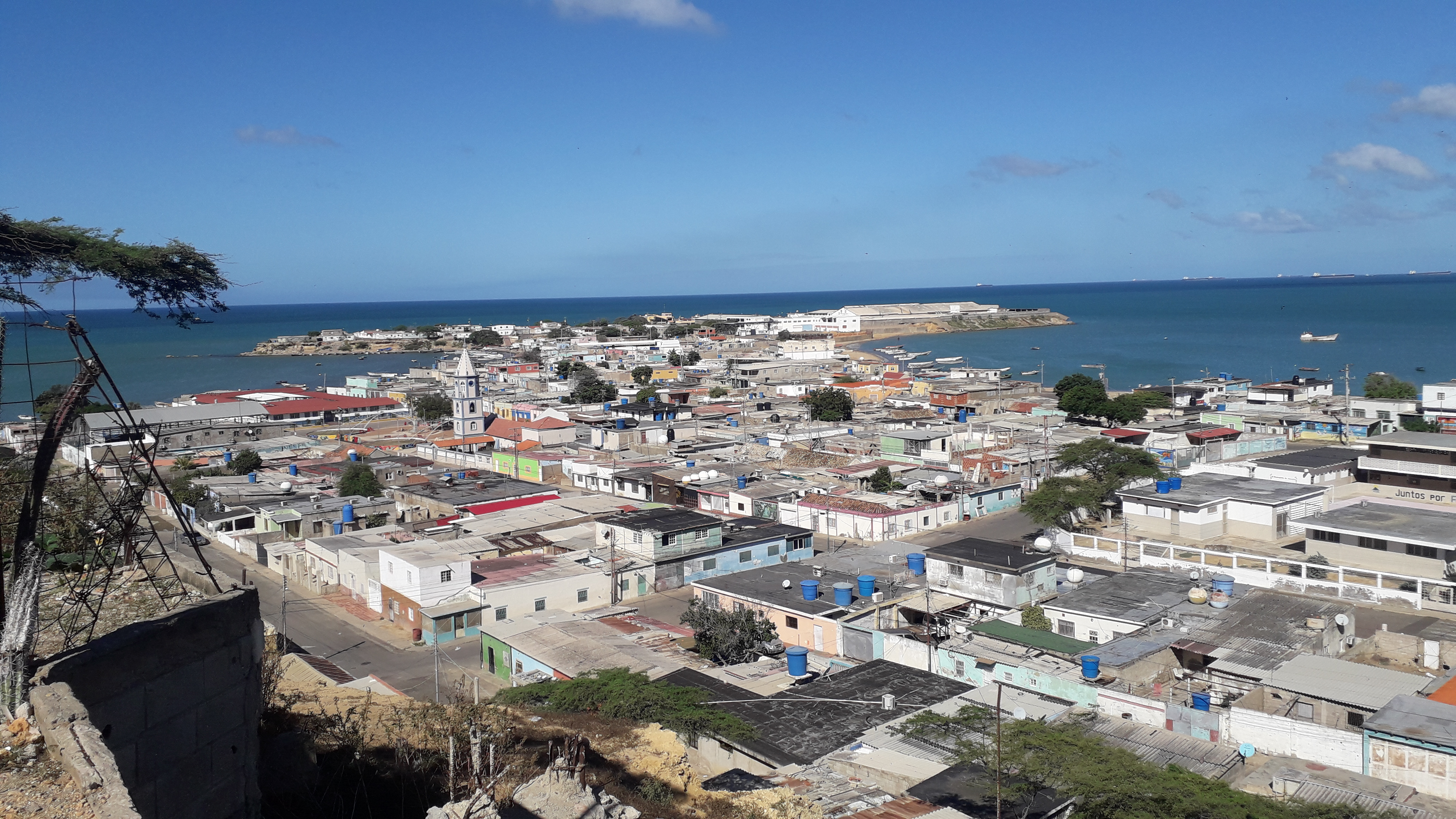

- Flag Coat of arms
- Nickname: "La Ciudad del Viento"
- Location in Venezuela
- Coordinates: 11°43′N 70°11′W
- Country: Venezuela
- State: Falcón
- Municipality: Carirubana

Government
  - Type: Mayor–council
  - Body: Alcaldía de Carirubana

Population (2019)
  - City: 154,100
  - Estimate (2026): 181,326
  - Rank: 18th (Agglomeration)
  - Urban: 255,662
  - Metro: 360,396
- Demonym: Puntofijense
- Time zone: UTC-04:00 (VET)
- Postal coded: 4102
- Area code: 269
- ISO 3166 code: VE-A
- Climate: BWh
- The area and population figures are for the municipality.

Punto Fijo is the capital city of the municipality of Carirubana in northern Falcón State, Venezuela. It is located on the southwestern coast of the Paraguaná Peninsula. Its metropolitan area includes the parishes of Norte, Carirubana, Punta Cardón and the parish of Judibana in the municipality of Los Taques. Punto Fijo is the largest city in Falcón State.

== History ==
Punto Fijo was founded in the early 1940s, on the outskirts of two refinery operations established by Standard Oil and Shell during the 1940s. Despite the name of the 1958 Puntofijo Pact, Punto Fijo is unrelated to the pact (the pact was signed at Puntofijo Residence in Caracas). Punto Fijo has an estimated population of 270,000 (est. 2002 census), mostly in the urban center.

Punto Fijo's name is commonly attributed to the late Rafael González Estaba, former city historian, who said that the place where the city now stands was a common stop (the "fixed point") for passers-by and fishermen.

== Economy ==
Punto Fijo has the world's second largest oil refinery complex, the Paraguaná Refinery Complex (CRP is its Spanish acronym), which consists of the Amuay and Cardón Refineries (both part of the CRP). The operation once refined around 1 million barrels per day, and all of these petroleum products were fuel for the local and regional economy. Also, Punto Fijo possesses the second most important fishing fleet in Venezuela, and has an industrial zone where electronics plants and light machinery plants are located. Punto Fijo includes a Free Zone for Touristic Investment allowing importation of goods free of tariffs.

The progressive development that Punto Fijo is facing currently has given incentive to local, municipal, state and national authorities to carry out public building works that the city needed years ago. This includes the main bus station, repairs to public roads, and settlement of a new thermoelectricity energy plant "Josefa Camejo". The private sector has made investments as well, like the Sambil Mall Paraguaná, and Paraguaná Mall. These new complexes joined the Centro Comercial y Recreacional Las Virtudes Mall.

== Transportation ==
Punto Fijo is crisscrossed from north to south and east to west by numerous avenues. A new bus terminal is under construction and expected to be ready by the beginning of 2010. The city is linked to Coro with a modern two-laned highway passing through the whole isthmus offering great views of the Médanos de Coro National Park as well as flora found in this semi-arid region. The air transport needs of Punto Fijo's are served by Las Piedras Airport, also known as Josefa Camejo International Airport.

== Geography ==
The city is located on the southwestern coast of the Paraguaná Peninsula. Its metropolitan area includes the parishes of Norte, Carirubana, Punta Cardón and the parish of Judibana in the municipality of Los Taques. It is the largest city in Falcón State.

=== Climate ===
According to the Köppen climate classification, Punto Fijo has a hot arid climate, abbreviated as BWh. The weather is hot year round. The majority of the scanty rain falls from August to December, but the city is the driest in South America outside the Arid Diagonal, receiving only around 180 millimetres or 7 inches of rainfall per year – only a third as much as semiarid Maracaibo and Riohacha.

Climate data for Punto Fijo
Month	Jan	Feb	Mar	Apr	May	Jun	Jul	Aug	Sep	Oct	Nov	Dec	Year
Mean daily maximum °C (°F)	29.8 (85.6)	30.0 (86.0)	30.6 (87.1)	31.3 (88.3)	31.8 (89.2)	32.3 (90.1)	32.4 (90.3)	33.1 (91.6)	32.7 (90.9)	31.5 (88.7)	30.5 (86.9)	30.0 (86.0)	31.3 (88.4)
Daily mean °C (°F)	26.2 (79.2)	26.3 (79.3)	26.8 (80.2)	27.4 (81.3)	28.0 (82.4)	28.3 (82.9)	28.3 (82.9)	28.9 (84.0)	28.9 (84.0)	28.2 (82.8)	27.5 (81.5)	26.8 (80.2)	27.6 (81.7)
Mean daily minimum °C (°F)	24.1 (75.4)	24.0 (75.2)	24.4 (75.9)	25.2 (77.4)	25.8 (78.4)	26.0 (78.8)	25.8 (78.4)	26.4 (79.5)	26.5 (79.7)	26.1 (79.0)	25.5 (77.9)	24.8 (76.6)	25.4 (77.7)
Average rainfall mm (inches)	8 (0.3)	5 (0.2)	6 (0.2)	13 (0.5)	30 (1.2)	10 (0.4)	7 (0.3)	15 (0.6)	52 (2.0)	82 (3.2)	67 (2.6)	25 (1.0)	320 (12.5)
Average precipitation days	1	1	1	2	3	1	1	2	6	11	8	4	41
Average relative humidity (%)	75	73	72	74	75	74	73	72	75	78	79	77	75
Source: Climatedata.org

== See also ==
- Geography of Venezuela
- Roman Catholic Diocese of Punto Fijo

== Notable persons ==
=== Miss Earth ===
Alyz Henrich, Miss Earth 2013
