= Paraguaná Peninsula =

Peninsula in Falcón, Venezuela

Paraguaná
- Peninsula
- Geographical map of the Paraguaná Peninsula

- Location within Venezuela
- Coordinates: 12°N 70°W
- Location: Falcón, Venezuela
- Age: Jurassic, Triassic
- Municipalities: Carirubana; Falcón; Los Taques

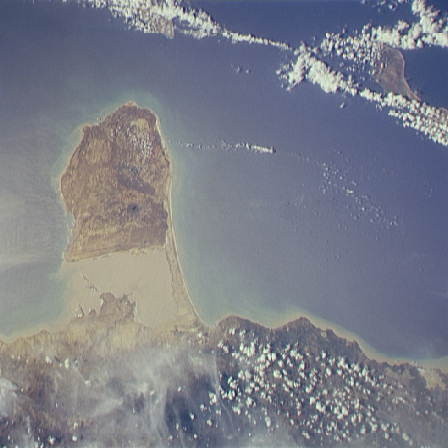
Satellite image of the Paraguaná Peninsula

Paraguaná (Spanish pronunciation: [paɾaɣwaˈna]) is a peninsula and tied island in Venezuela, situated in the north of Falcón State, and comprises the municipalities of Carirubana, Los Taques and Falcón. The island of Aruba lies 27 km (17 miles) to the north. Bonaire and Curaçao are slightly further away. Paraguaná lies in the Caribbean Sea, and is connected to the rest of the state by the natural isthmus or tombolo of Médanos. It is the eastern boundary of the Gulf of Venezuela.

Because it is almost completely surrounded by water, the peninsula is sometimes called Cora Island, and considered a part of the Leeward Antilles. It was in fact a separate island earlier in the Holocene, before the development of the tombolo that connected it to the mainland sometime in the last 12,000 years, and possibly as recently as 3,000 years ago. Paraguaná can thus be classified as a tied island.

Geologically, Paraguaná is a tabular limestone area. The eastern coast is exposed to strong wave action, where low cliffs alternate with beaches. A central hill, Cerro Santa Ana, rises abruptly to 830 m through well-defined vegetation zones. A fringing coral reef extends along the north-eastern coast. The western coast is more sheltered and low-lying, with high fault-induced cliffs only around Punto Fijo. South of Paraguaná is the shallow Coro Gulf into which the Mitare River flows. The bird-foot delta of this river has grown rapidly during the past 3,000 years, sheltered by the isthmus of Medanos and the Paraguaná peninsula. The eastern shore of the isthmus is exposed to strong waves, and has a long 32-km beach protected by a ledge of exposed beach rock. Dunes, including some barchans, are migrating across the southern part of the isthmus towards the Gulf of Coro. Tectonic processes, reef building, erosion, longshore drift, sediment deposition, and dune development have all been influential in the formation of Paraguaná and its associated features.

The solar eclipse of February 26, 1998 was visible from the peninsula. The center line of the eclipse crossed the northern part of the peninsula, parallel to its north-west coastline. The skies were completely clear from the peninsula. Bleachers were set up north of Punto Fijo as a designated eclipse viewing spot.

== Economy ==
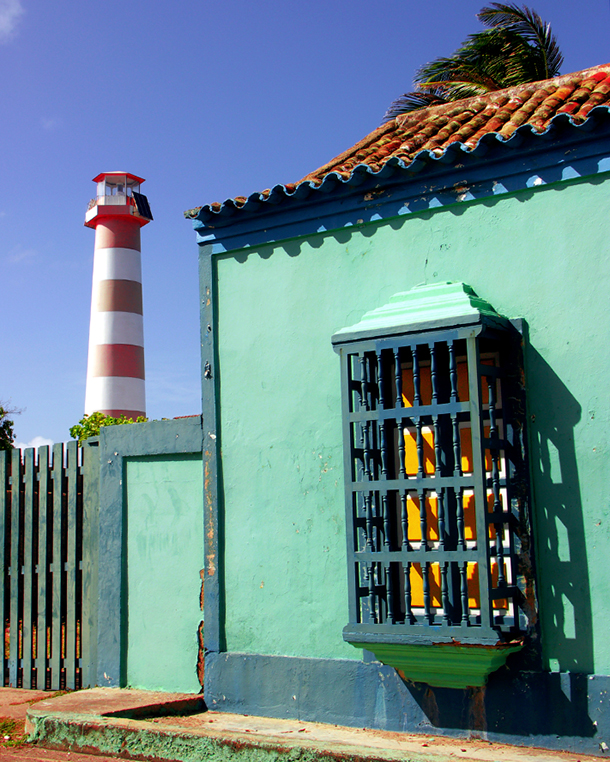
Typical colonial house in Adícora

Paraguaná Zoological Park.

Paraguaná hosts three large oil refineries, in the western part. Together these comprise the third largest oil refinery complex in the world, the Paraguaná Refinery Complex. Most of the oil that PDVSA acquires is processed in this complex. The output of these refineries is shipped internationally through the ports of Amuay and Cardón. Many engineers that worked in the refineries have moved to the United States to work at Citgo.

Paraguaná is a duty-free zone, therefore many international shops, notably Arabian, have opened.

While most of the economy is centered on the oil industry, tourism is growing. While most of the tourists come from other parts of Venezuela, many tourists come from surrounding countries such as Colombia, Aruba, Bonaire, Curaçao, and even a few tourists from the United States. The beaches serve as a large part of tourist attraction. There is a luxury beachfront hotel called Eurobuilding Villa Caribe. Paraguaná also takes advantage of the duty-free shopping for tourism and opened a Paraguaná Mall which is used for that. Two shopping malls are in the area. The mall, Las Virtudes, attracts a lot of people, and the mall, Sambil Paraguaná, attracts many tourists, and has a luxury hotel, Lidotel, in it. Western news sources point to Paraguaná as being an ongoing construction site for launch purposes in connection with Iranian-manufactured and imported ballistic missiles to the Bolivarian Republic under agreement of the late president, Hugo Chavez.

The peninsula is served by Josefa Camejo International Airport in Punto Fijo, among others.

Supermercado La Franco Italiana used to be headquartered in the peninsula, until it was merged with Supermercados De Candido, which maintains branches there.
