= Dabajuro =

City and municipality in Falcón State, Venezuela

- City
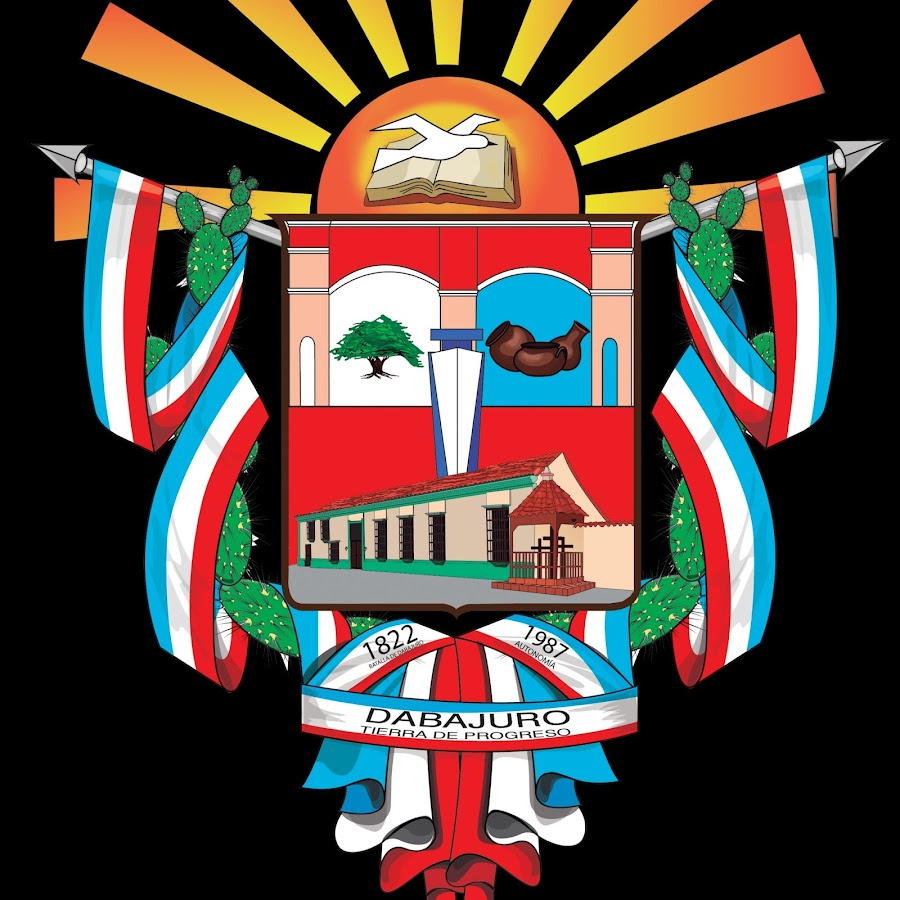
- Coat of arms

- Location within Venezuela
- Coordinates: 11°01′N 70°40′W
- Country: Venezuela
- State: Falcón State

Population (c. 2005)
  - Total: 25,469

Dabajuro is a city and municipality in southwestern Falcón State, Venezuela with a population of 25,469 (c. 2005).

== History ==
While a small agricultural village existed on the site, it was really in 1914 with the arrival of the oil companies in the Buchivacoa District that Dabajuro became a town. World War I drove a need for oil, and while a number of companies prospected for oil in the area, it was Standard Oil who developed the resource. However, by 1932 with the worldwide depression, Standard Oil was gone, and the local economy had collapsed. It was only with the renewed need for oil in World War II that the oil companies returned. However, by 1960 the oil fields of Lake Maracaibo had lured the oil companies away, and Dabajuro was again economically abandoned. It was only gradually after the completion of the Falcón-Zulia Highway from Maracaibo to Coro, that the city began to grow again on a more stable basis.

== Geography ==
=== Fauna, flora and vegetation ===
The municipality of Dabajuro lies in the Catatumbo Moist Forests ecoregion, and the major natural habitat type is tropical and subtropical moist broadleaf forests. The area of the municipality has seen a historical transformation from remote woodlands (predominant in 81.5% of the area) to populated rangelands (predominant in 63.0% of the area) between 1700 and 2000.

Common birds include Black-crested Antshrike (Sakesphorus canadensis), Rufous-browed Peppershrike (Cyclarhis gujanensis), Straight-billed Woodcreeper (Xiphorhynchus picus), White-whiskered Spinetail (Synallaxis candei), Trinidad Euphonia (Euphonia trinitatis), Scrub Greenlet (Hylophilus flavipes).

=== Climate ===
Minimum monthly temperature in the Dabajuro municipality lies between 10.6 and 22.4 °C, while maximum temperature is between 21.7 and 31.1 °C. Total annual precipitation fluctuates between 802 and 1300 mm. Most rain falls between September and November, while the driest quarter comprises January to March.

Climate data for Dabajuro Municipality (1960–1990)
Month	Jan	Feb	Mar	Apr	May	Jun	Jul	Aug	Sep	Oct	Nov	Dec	Year
Daily mean °C (°F)	22.9 (73.2)	23.7 (74.7)	24.1 (75.4)	24.6 (76.3)	24.7 (76.5)	24.8 (76.6)	24.6 (76.3)	24.9 (76.8)	24.9 (76.8)	24.4 (75.9)	23.9 (75.0)	23.5 (74.3)	24.3 (75.7)
Average rainfall mm (inches)	14.8 (0.58)	8.8 (0.35)	21.5 (0.85)	70.3 (2.77)	119.1 (4.69)	76.3 (3.00)	67.4 (2.65)	119.2 (4.69)	155.0 (6.10)	181.3 (7.14)	121.5 (4.78)	38.1 (1.50)	993.4 (39.11)
Source: WorldClim ver 1.4
