= Falcón =

- State of Venezuela
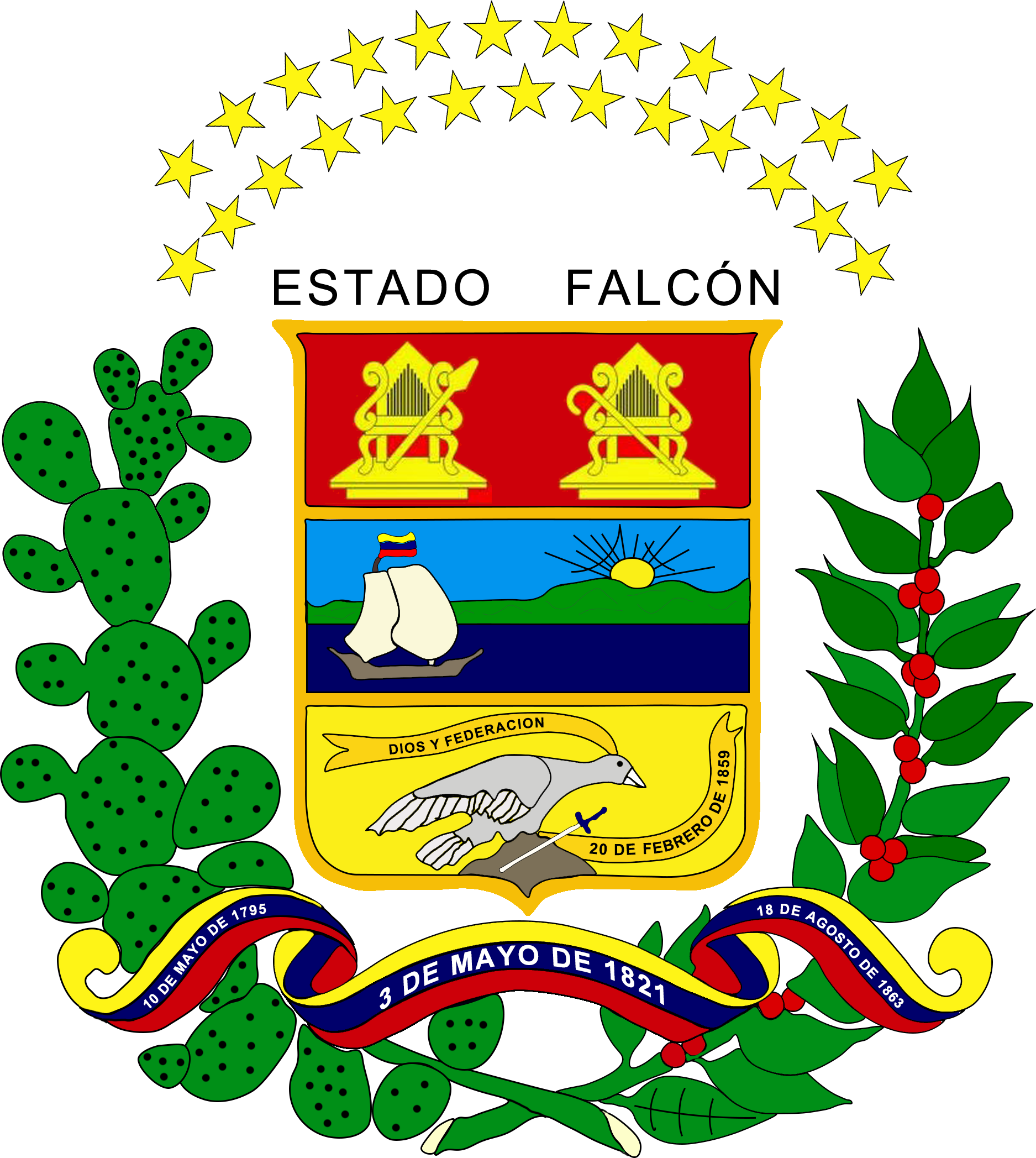
- Flag Coat of arms
- Motto(s): Dios y Federación (God and Federation)
- Location within Venezuela
- Coordinates: 11°24′24″N 69°40′40″W
- Country: Venezuela
- Created: 1864^{[c]}
- Named for: Juan Crisóstomo Falcón
- Capital: Coro

Government
  - Body: Legislative Council
  - Governor: Víctor Clark

Area
  - Total: 24,800 km^{2} (9,600 sq mi)
  - Rank: 10th
- 2.71% of Venezuela

Population (2011 census)
  - Total: 902,847
  - Rank: 11th
- 3.45% of Venezuela
- Time zone: UTC−4 (VET)
- ISO 3166 code: VE-I
- Emblematic tree: Cují yaque (Prosopis juliflora)
- HDI (2019): 0.701 high · 11th of 24
- Website: www.falcon.gob.ve
- ^[c]As Coro State; in 1874, it was renamed as Falcón State.

Falcón State (Spanish: Estado Falcón, IPA: [esˈtaðo falˈkon]) is one of the 23 states of Venezuela. The state capital is Coro.

The state was named after Juan Crisóstomo Falcón.

== History ==
=== Early history ===
Present day Falcón State was first explored in 1499 by Juan de la Cosa and Américo Vespucio, as part of an expedition supervised by Alonso de Ojeda. In 1527, the city of Coro was founded by Juan Ampíes, who named it "Santa Ana de Coro". In 1811, when Venezuela declared its independence from Spain, Coro remained faithful to the Spanish Crown and was merged with the Province of Maracaibo. In 1815, King Fernando VII created the Province of Coro. In 1821, the province was liberated from Spain by Josefa Camejo during the Venezuelan War of Independence. The area then became a province of the department of Zulia of the Republic of Gran Colombia. In 1830, with the separation of Venezuela from Gran Colombia, the Falcón area became a separate province of that nation.

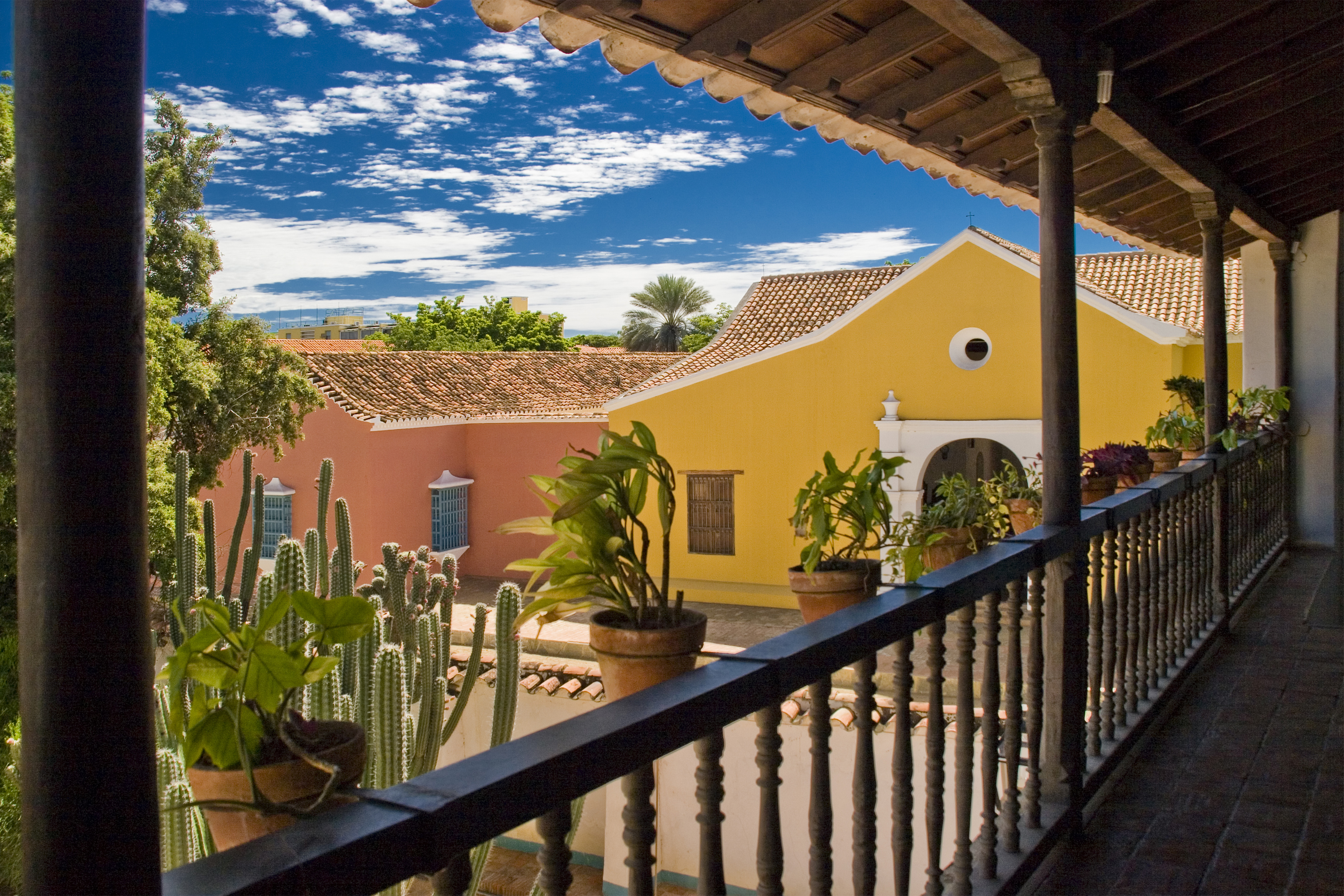
Historic center of Santa Ana de Coro, Falcon State, Venezuela

By 1856, the province contained the cantons of Coro, San Luis, Casigua, Costa Arriba, Cumarebo and the Paraguaná Peninsula. In 1859, after the Federal War began on 20 February in Coro, the area was declared the Independent State of Coro. In 1864, it became a federal state, part of the United States of Venezuela.

=== Falcón State ===
In 1872 the province was renamed Falcón State, in honor of the Federal War leader Juan Crisóstomo Falcón. In 1879, along with Lara and Yaracuy, minus the Department of Nirgua, it became part of the Western Northern State. Between 1881 and 1890 is formed, with Zulia, the state of Falcón-Zulia.

In 1891 Falcón was reestablished as a separate state. In 1899 its name changed, and for a short period of time, it retook its historical denomination of Estado Coro; returning in 1901 to Falcón .

In 1899, the territory comprising the towns of Tucacas and Chichiriviche, was annexed by Falcón. Lara State received the municipality of Urdaneta.

Coro, the capital, founded with the name of Santa Ana de Coro, was declared National Monument in 1950, and UNESCO has named it Cultural Patrimony of the Humanity in 1993.

== Geography ==
Falcón State is located in the north of the Corian System. To the south, Falcón contains medium-altitude mountain ranges configured from east to west, which in the eastern part of the state reach the Caribbean Sea, forming maritime valleys.

West from the city of Coro, a coastal plain runs parallel to the Gulf of Venezuela. To the north lies one of the most characteristic geographic features of the Venezuelan coast: the Paraguana Peninsula, linked to the mainland by the isthmus of Médanos de Coro National Park.

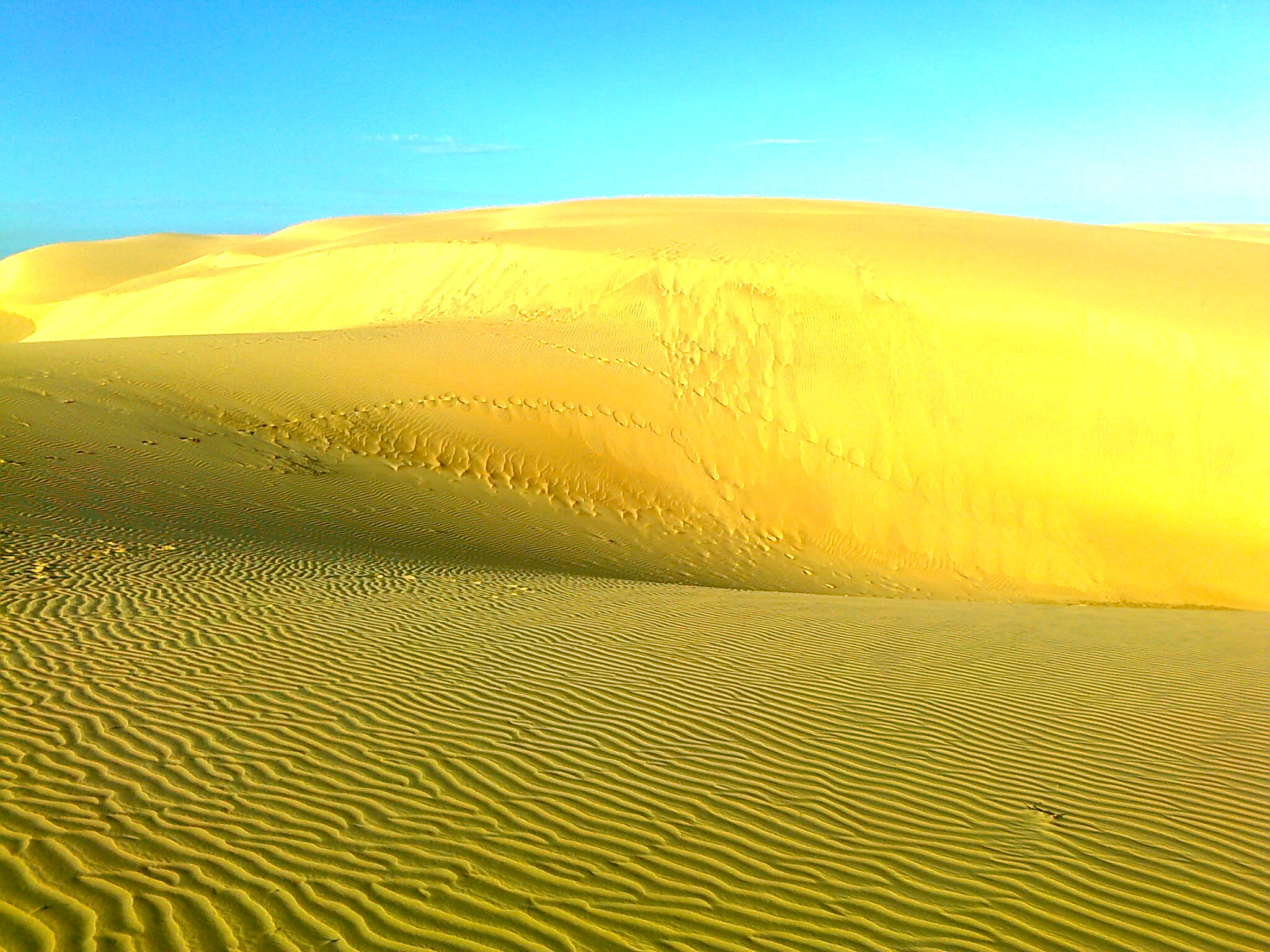
Médanos de Coro National Park

=== Climate ===
A hot arid climate (BWh according to the Köppen climate classification) of very low rainfall dominates the western coast and the Paraguaná Peninsula. Coro receives 380 mm (15 in) of rain per year, which frequently fails in dry years, with an average temperature of 28.4 °C (83.1 °F), while in Punto Fijo there is just 180 mm (7 in) of annual rainfall with average temperatures of 27.6 °C (81.7 °F).

The extremely dry, desert conditions, with rainfall of less than 300 mm or 12 in, are recognized on the western coasts of Coro and above all on the isthmus of Los Médanos de Coro, with average annual temperatures of between 28 and 29 °C (82.4 and 84.2 °F). In the eastern coastal sectors, rainfall increases from 800 to 1,200 mm (31 to 47 in) per year, always with high temperatures. Somewhat more favourable, with temperatures between 25 and 27 °C (77.0 and 80.6 °F), are the climatic conditions of the mountainous foothills, recognizing a sub-humid climate in the higher altitudes of the Sierras de San Luis and Churuguara, with an annual rainfall of 1,300 mm or 51 in and average temperatures of 22 °C or 71.6 °F. On 29 April 2015, Coro recorded a temperature of 43.6 °C (110.5 °F), which is the highest temperature to have ever been recorded in Venezuela.

Climate data for Coro
| Month | Jan | Feb | Mar | Apr | May | Jun | Jul | Aug | Sep | Oct | Nov | Dec | Year |
|---|---|---|---|---|---|---|---|---|---|---|---|---|---|
| Record high °C (°F) | 37.8 (100.0) | 35.9 (96.6) | 37.5 (99.5) | 43.6 (110.5) | 39.1 (102.4) | 38.2 (100.8) | 38.5 (101.3) | 39.5 (103.1) | 38.5 (101.3) | 38.1 (100.6) | 36.8 (98.2) | 36.8 (98.2) | 43.6 (110.5) |
| Mean daily maximum °C (°F) | 31.3 (88.3) | 31.7 (89.1) | 32.2 (90.0) | 32.6 (90.7) | 33.5 (92.3) | 33.8 (92.8) | 33.5 (92.3) | 34.2 (93.6) | 34.4 (93.9) | 33.5 (92.3) | 32.4 (90.3) | 31.4 (88.5) | 32.9 (91.2) |
| Daily mean °C (°F) | 27.5 (81.5) | 27.8 (82.0) | 28.3 (82.9) | 28.8 (83.8) | 29.6 (85.3) | 29.8 (85.6) | 29.5 (85.1) | 30.0 (86.0) | 30.1 (86.2) | 29.4 (84.9) | 28.6 (83.5) | 27.7 (81.9) | 28.9 (84.0) |
| Mean daily minimum °C (°F) | 23.6 (74.5) | 23.8 (74.8) | 24.3 (75.7) | 24.9 (76.8) | 25.6 (78.1) | 25.7 (78.3) | 25.5 (77.9) | 25.7 (78.3) | 25.8 (78.4) | 25.3 (77.5) | 24.8 (76.6) | 23.9 (75.0) | 24.9 (76.8) |
| Record low °C (°F) | 19.5 (67.1) | 19.0 (66.2) | 20.5 (68.9) | 21.1 (70.0) | 20.4 (68.7) | 21.8 (71.2) | 20.5 (68.9) | 21.6 (70.9) | 20.5 (68.9) | 20.7 (69.3) | 20.8 (69.4) | 18.9 (66.0) | 18.9 (66.0) |
| Average rainfall mm (inches) | 22.0 (0.87) | 16.1 (0.63) | 9.1 (0.36) | 17.0 (0.67) | 28.8 (1.13) | 26.9 (1.06) | 36.7 (1.44) | 29.2 (1.15) | 36.3 (1.43) | 54.2 (2.13) | 52.1 (2.05) | 54.1 (2.13) | 382.5 (15.06) |
| Average rainy days (≥ 1.0 mm) | 2.5 | 1.6 | 1.2 | 1.5 | 2.6 | 3.2 | 4.3 | 3.5 | 3.7 | 5.4 | 5.8 | 4.8 | 40.1 |
| Average relative humidity (%) | 69.0 | 68.5 | 67.0 | 69.0 | 68.5 | 68.0 | 67.5 | 67.0 | 67.0 | 70.5 | 72.0 | 71.0 | 68.8 |
| Mean monthly sunshine hours | 291.4 | 268.8 | 288.3 | 234.0 | 248.0 | 255.0 | 285.2 | 288.3 | 261.0 | 251.1 | 252.0 | 266.6 | 3,189.7 |
Source 1: Instituto Nacional de Meteorología e Hidrología (INAMEH)
Source 2: NOAA (extremes, rainy days, and sun)

=== Soils ===
On the coastline the soils are calcareous, and between the Lara and Falcón mountains, they are clay. They vary in quality, but in general, the availability of land for traditional agriculture can be classified as low, with 89% of very low potential, 3% of low potential and 6% of moderate potential.

Only 2% of it is located in the southeast valleys and alluvial areas, basins with very high potential. The limitations of the arid and semi-arid soils come from salinity, dryness caused by low rainfall, low concentration of organic matter and the influence of climatic agents such as wind.

=== Relief ===
The Corian System of Falcon State presents a diversity of landscapes ranging from coastal plains on its Caribbean side to mountain ranges formed by valleys and hills, in an area of transition between the two major mountain systems of the country. The Sierra de San Luis have the highest altitude of the entire system, but are of very modest height; the highest does not exceed 1600 meters (Cerro Galicia).

Cerro Santa Ana is another natural landmark, located in the center of the Paraguaná peninsula. Unlike the rest of the peninsula, the characteristics of Santa Ana Hill are the contrast between its greenness and the xerophytic vegetation of the Paraguaná area. It has three peaks: the Santa Ana (the highest, that ascends to about 830 meters above sea level), the Buena Vista and Moruy.

=== Hydrography ===
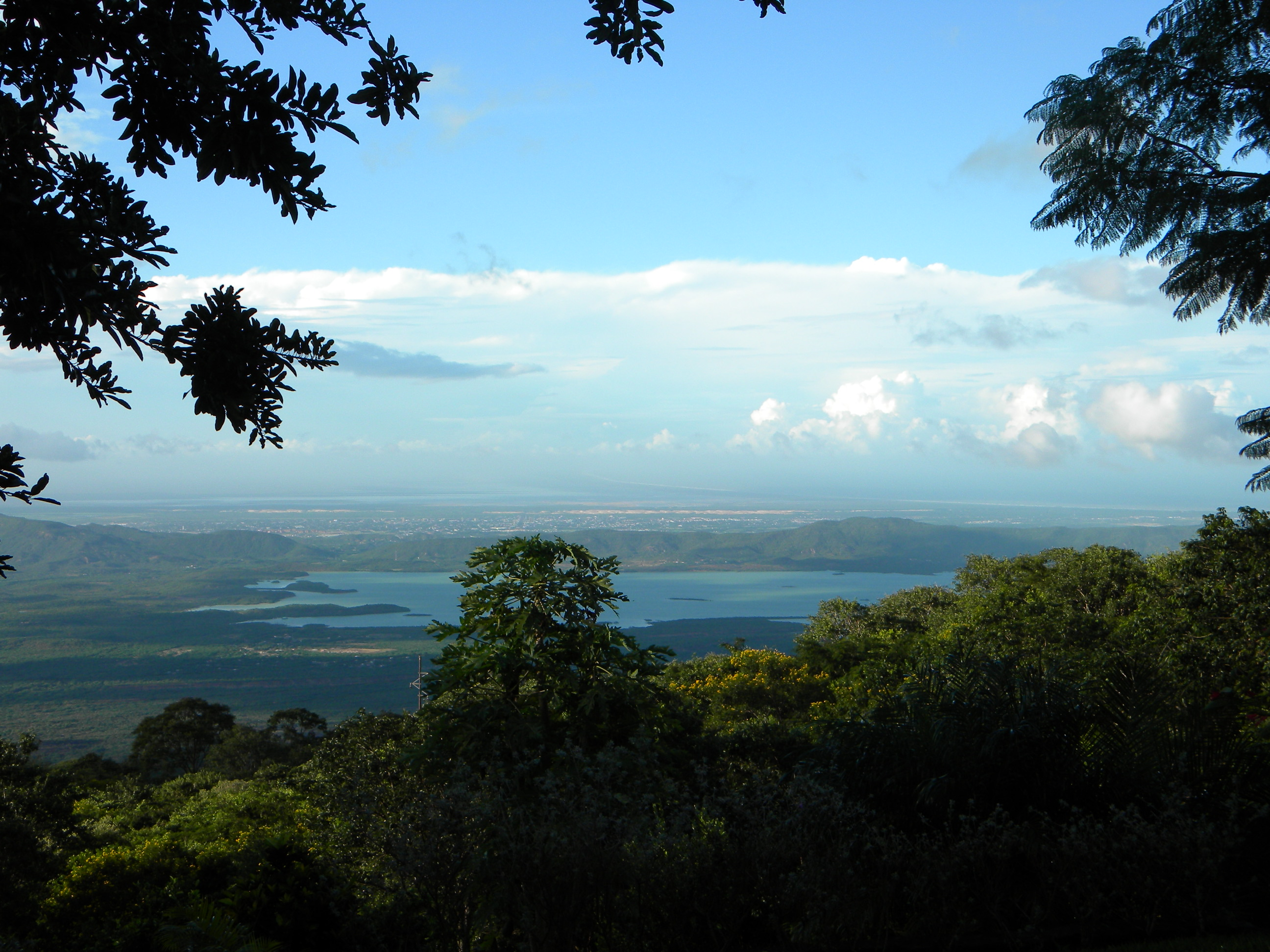
Isiro Reservoir, Falcon State

The state's hydrography is very poor. All the rivers flow north, either into the Caribbean Sea or the Gulf of Venezuela. However, the main Venezuelan river of the Caribbean basin, the Tocuyo, bathes a large area of the state before flowing into the Caribbean on the east coast of the state after travelling 423 km. Another river worth mentioning that flows into the Caribbean is Rio Aroa, with a length of 130 km. From the basin of the Gulf of Venezuela, the main ones are the Matícora (201 km) and the Mitare with 120 km.

- Main rivers: Tocuyo, Aroa, Güigüe, Hueque, Matícora, Mitare, Pedregal, Remedios, Ricoa, San Luis.
- Lakes: under the San Luis mountain range in the Cueva del Toro, there is an underground lake, the largest known in Venezuela, called "Río Acarite".

=== Flora and fauna ===
The Caribbean marine life off the coast is very rich. There is a great diversity of algae on the rocky shores and on the reef bottoms. The rich fishing grounds have been known for centuries; among the species that are caught locally are various shrimp, octopus, squid, mackerel, corocoro, mullet, horse mackerel, lebranche and dogfish.

Other species in the area are endangered and highly protected, such as several types of sea turtle and the critically endangered Orinoco crocodile. The latter inhabits the coastal mangroves of Morrocoy, Cuare Wildlife Refuge, and the isthmus, along with the numerous species of wading and seabirds, such as shearwater, herons, scarlet ibis, gannets and the Caribbean flamingo. Among the many invertebrates, the Hueque scorpion (Tityus falconensis), named after the region and discovered in the caves of the Juan Crisóstomo Falcón National Park, is found throughout Falcón; the Scolopendra gigantea, which is the largest centipede in the world, and the vivid greenbottle-blue tarantula (Chromatopelma cyaneopubescens), of Paraguaná, are also native to the region.

In the cactus and spiny forests that encompass the lowlands, plants heavily armed with thorns predominate, such as cují yaque (Falcón's emblematic tree), broom, yabo, espinito, Opuntia (also known as tuna, e.g. prickly-pear) and Pachycereus pringlei (or cardones). Introduced succulents, such as Aloe vera and sisal plants, are scattered throughout the region. Fauna in this habitat includes bats, rabbits, foxes, rodents, iguanas and lizards; among the birds are the vermilion cardinal and the tropical mockingbird, also known as paraulata llanera or chuchube (Mimus gilvus).

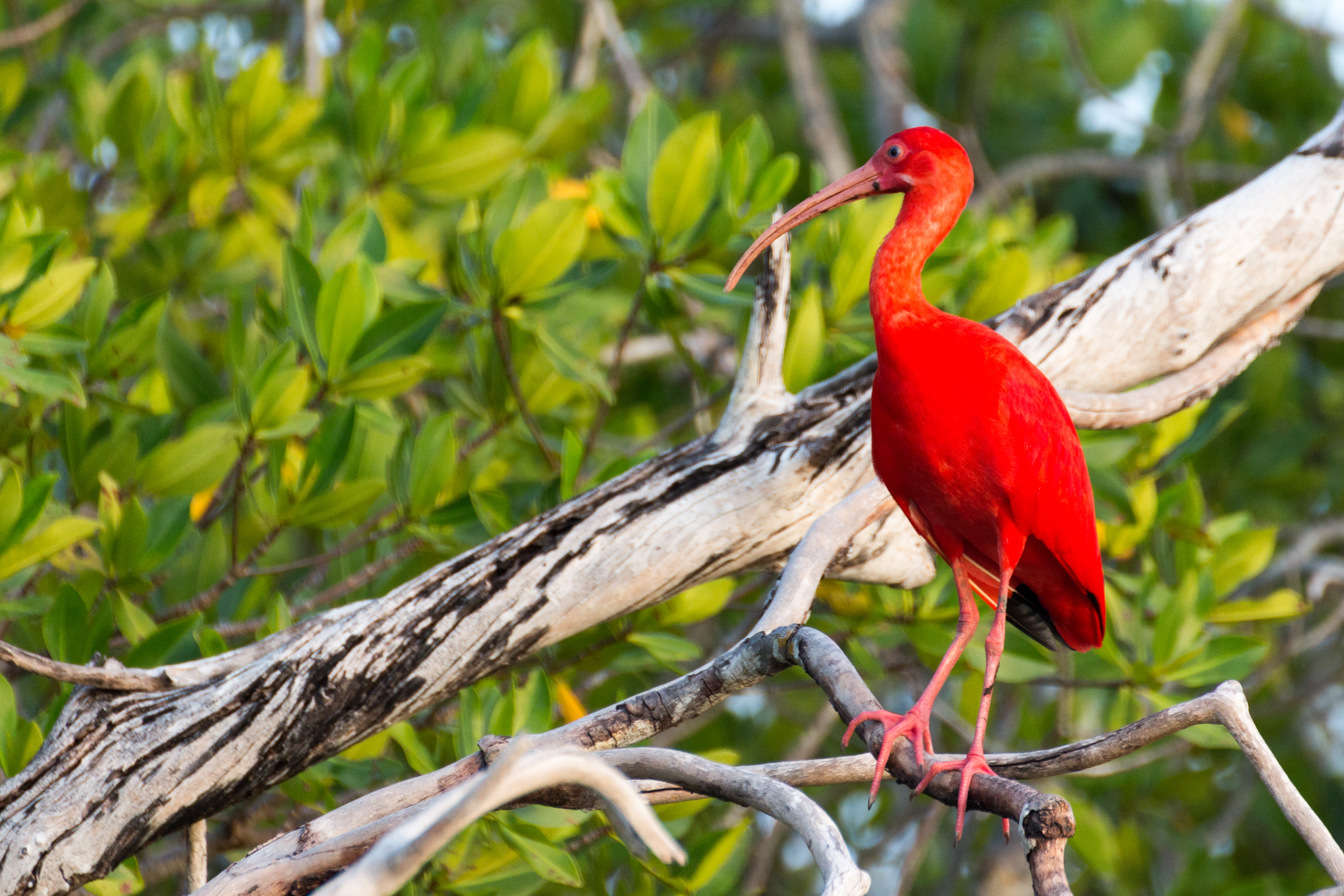
Scarlet ibis in the Cuare Wildlife Refuge, Falcón State

On the upper slopes of the mountains, cloud forests dominate, and an enormous variety of ferns and other plants grow. In the limestone formations of the Sierra, you can find the guácharo, or oilbirds, which live inside the caverns. Also found are the blacksmith's bellbird and the keel-billed toucan, and numerous amphibians and reptiles, such as the nibbling turtle, endemic to the mountains of the Sistema Coriano.

=== Geology ===
Early Cretaceous rocks cover the pre-existing sedimentary units in the south, in what is one of the thickest sections in South America. The rounded hills of the Cocodite table are supported by an ancient igneous-metromorphic complex and a poorly-metamorphosed Jurassic succession.

To the east of Vela de Coro and Cumarebo, the foothills are supported by outcrops of the young Tertiary, also present to the north of Urumaco, where the stones are rough and darkened by iron oxide; while the plains concentrated in the lower part of the rivers are alluvial.

The arid plain presents quaternary earthquakes, with elevations sustained by rocks from the upper tertiary.

== Politics and government ==
As a federal state, it is autonomous and equal in political terms to the other members of the Federation. It organizes its administration and public powers through the Federal Constitution of Falcón State of 2004, issued by the Legislative Council.

=== Executive power ===
It is composed of the Governor of the State of Falcón and a group of State Secretaries of his confidence appointed and removed by the regional government. The Governor is elected by the people through a direct and secret vote for a period of four years and with the possibility of immediate reelection for equal periods, being in charge of the state administration before the Legislative Council.

The first elected governor of Falcon was Aldo Cermeño of the Social Christian Party (Copei), who governed between 1989 and 1992. The current state governor is Victor Clark, of the ruling United Socialist Party of Venezuela (PSUV) party, elected for the 2017-2021 period.

Like the other 23 federal entities of Venezuela, the State maintains its own police force, which is supported and complemented by the National Police and the Venezuelan National Guard.

=== Legislative power ===
The state legislature is the responsibility of the Falcón State Legislative Council. It is a unicameral and autonomous body, elected by the people through direct and secret vote every four years, and maybe re-elected for two consecutive periods, under a system of proportional representation of the population of the state and its municipalities. It has 11 legislators, of whom 3 are list and 8 are nominal.

== Municipalities and municipal seats ==
Falcon State is subdivided into 25 municipalities (municipios), listed below with their administrative capitals, areas and populations.

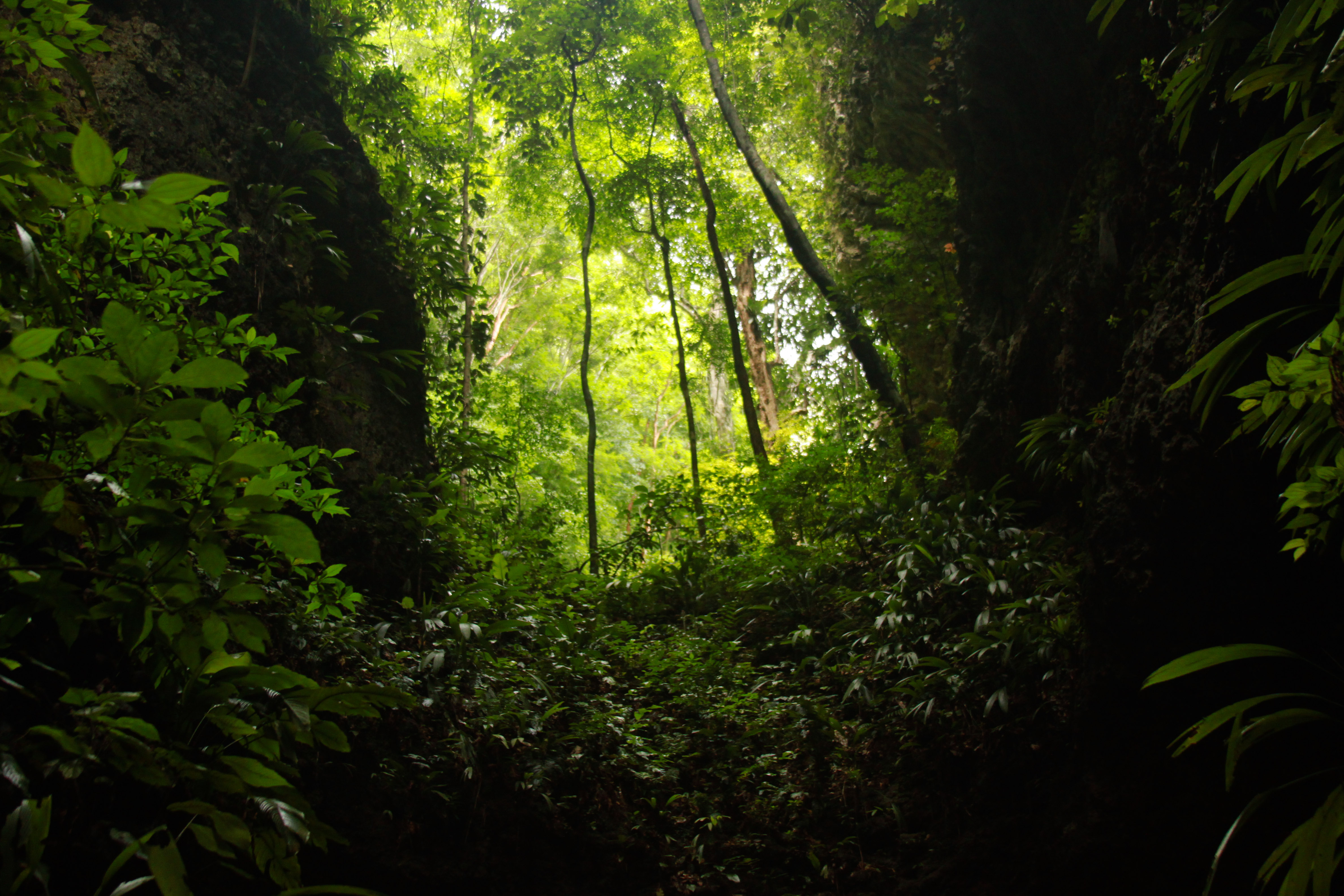
Cueva de la Quebrada del Toro National Park, Unión Municipality, Falcón

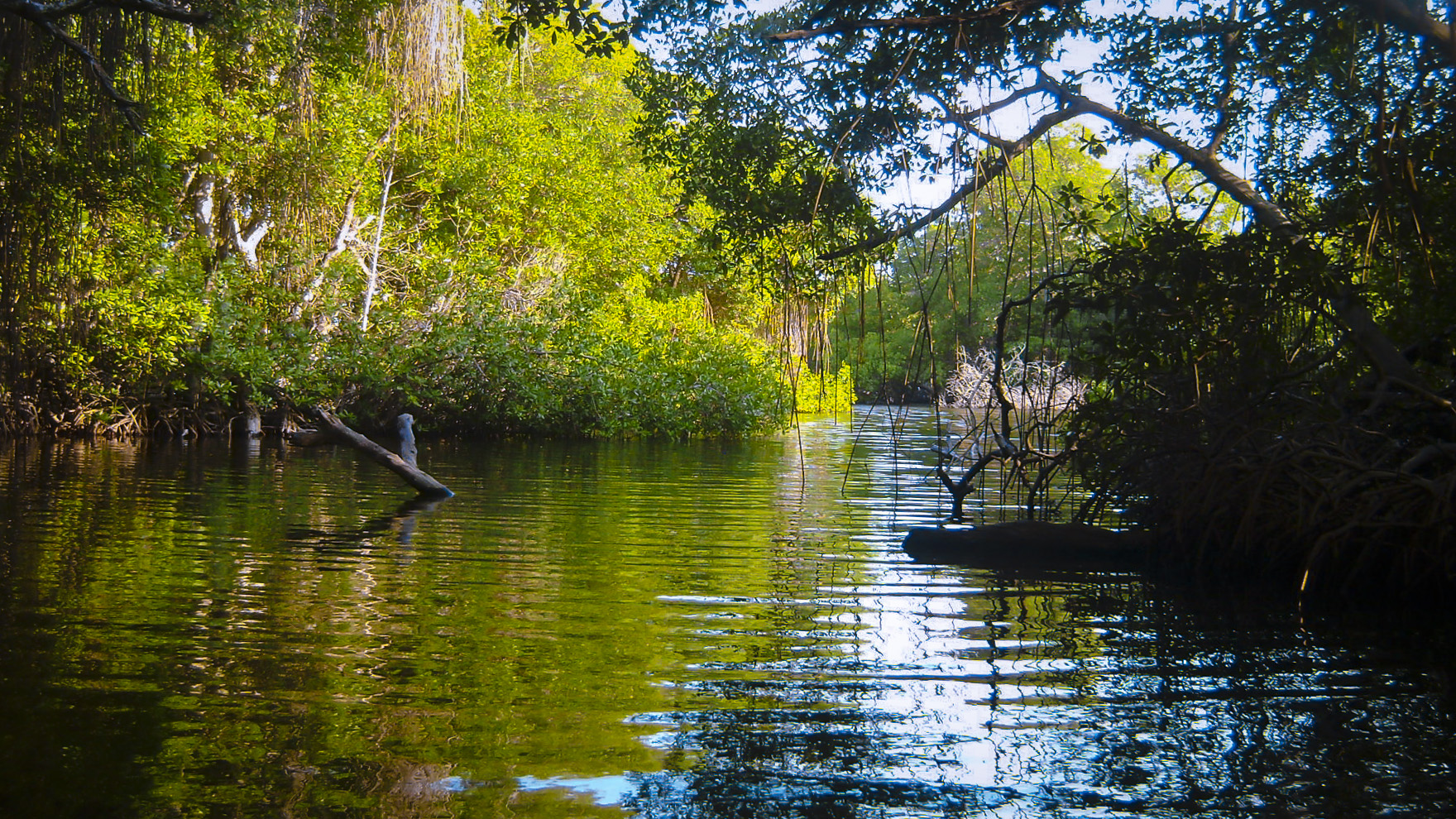
Mangroves in Morrocoy National Park

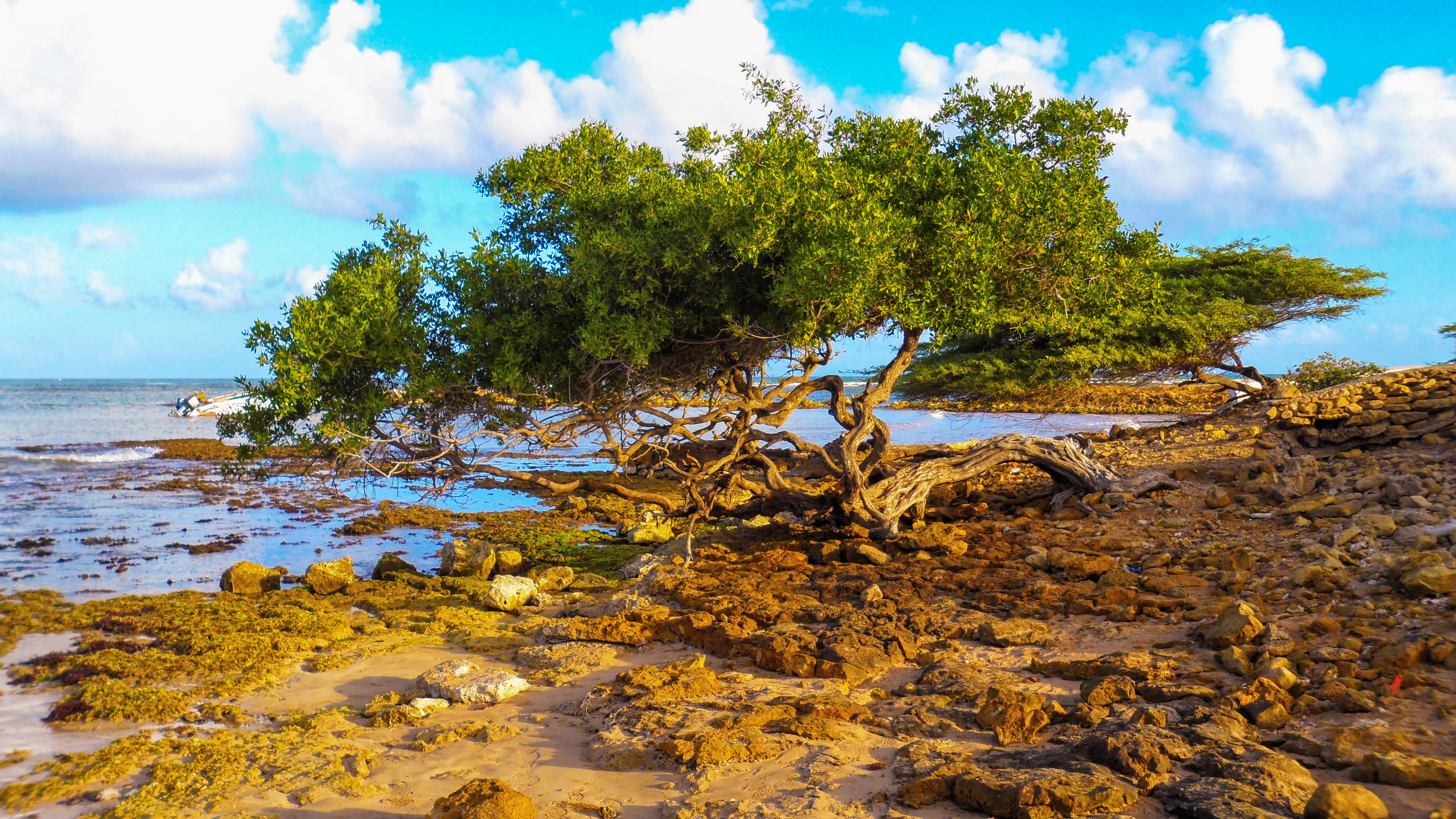
Puerto Escondido, Falcón State

Municipalities of Falcón

| Municipality | Administrative Capital | Area (km^{2}) | Population Census 2011 | Estimate 30 June 2016 |
|---|---|---|---|---|
| Acosta | San Juan de los Cayos | 757 | 19,045 | 21,272 |
| Bolívar | San Luis | 295 | 8,539 | 9,420 |
| Buchivacoa | Capatárida | 2,657 | 22,897 | 25,470 |
| Cacique Manaure | Yaracal | 190 | 10,874 | 12,149 |
| Carirubana | Punto Fijo | 684 | 239,444 | 276,251 |
| Colina | La Vela de Coro | 582 | 41,510 | 46,631 |
| Dabajuro | Dabajuro | 1,144 | 23,388 | 26,364 |
| Democracia | Pedregal | 2,602 | 9,944 | 11,293 |
| Falcón | Pueblo Nuevo | 1,577 | 46,215 | 55,196 |
| Federación | Churuguara | 1,084 | 29,251 | 33,138 |
| Jacura | Jacura | 1,842 | 11,232 | 12,492 |
| Los Taques | Santa Cruz de Los Taques | 231 | 41,579 | 45,681 |
| Mauroa | Mene de Mauroa | 1,904 | 24,920 | 27,488 |
| Miranda | Santa Ana de Coro | 1,805 | 211,537 | 239,961 |
| Monseñor Iturriza | Chichiriviche | 907 | 19,300 | 21,927 |
| Palmasola | Palmasola | 194 | 7,077 | 8,306 |
| Petit | Cabure | 1,025 | 13,725 | 15,316 |
| Píritu | Píritu | 1,168 | 10,628 | 11,685 |
| San Francisco | Mirimire | 346 | 11,030 | 12,219 |
| Silva | Tucacas | 537 | 32,193 | 41,826 |
| Sucre | La Cruz de Taratara | 840 | 5,781 | 6,379 |
| Tocópero | Tocópero | 83 | 5,519 | 6,010 |
| Unión | Santa Cruz de Bucaral | 975 | 15,660 | 17,441 |
| Urumaco | Urumaco | 752 | 8,349 | 9,044 |
| Zamora | Puerto Cumarebo | 619 | 33,210 | 37,868 |
| Estado Falcón | Coro | 24,800 | 902,847 | 1,030,827 |

The Paraguaná Peninsula comprises the municipalities of Carirubana, Los Taques and Falcón.

== Demographics ==
Historical population
| Year | Pop. | ±% p.a. |
|---|---|---|
| 1873 | 99,920 | — |
| 1881 | 113,877 | +1.65% |
| 1891 | 139,110 | +2.02% |
| 1920 | 128,255 | −0.28% |
| 1926 | 178,642 | +5.68% |
| 1936 | 215,140 | +1.88% |
| 1941 | 232,644 | +1.58% |
| 1950 | 258,759 | +1.19% |
| 1961 | 340,450 | +2.53% |
| 1971 | 407,957 | +1.83% |
| 1981 | 503,896 | +2.13% |
| 1990 | 599,185 | +1.94% |
| 2001 | 763,188 | +2.22% |
| 2011 | 902,847 | +1.69% |
Source: "XIV CENSO NACIONAL DE POBLACIÓN Y VIVIENDA - Resultados por Entidad Federal y Municipio del Estado Falcón" (PDF). Instituto Nacional de Estadística.

The population of Falcon State in 2011 was 902,847 inhabitants, while in 2001 there were 763,188 inhabitants. Its population density has risen from 30.8 inhabitants/km^{2} in 2001 to 36.4 inhabitants/km^{2} in 2011. Due to the constant growth of urban areas, a decrease in rural life is observed, with the urban population reaching 67.3% of the total state population in 1990. In 2011 it is estimated that the urban population will be around 600,000 inhabitants, distributed in several cities headed by the conurbation of 228,931 inhabitants formed by the city of Santa Ana de Coro (192,558 inhabitants) and its port La Vela de Coro (36,373 inhabitants); and by the metropolitan area of Punto Fijo, which includes the former fishing villages of Las Piedras, Carirubana and Punta Cardón, with a population of over 300,000 inhabitants.

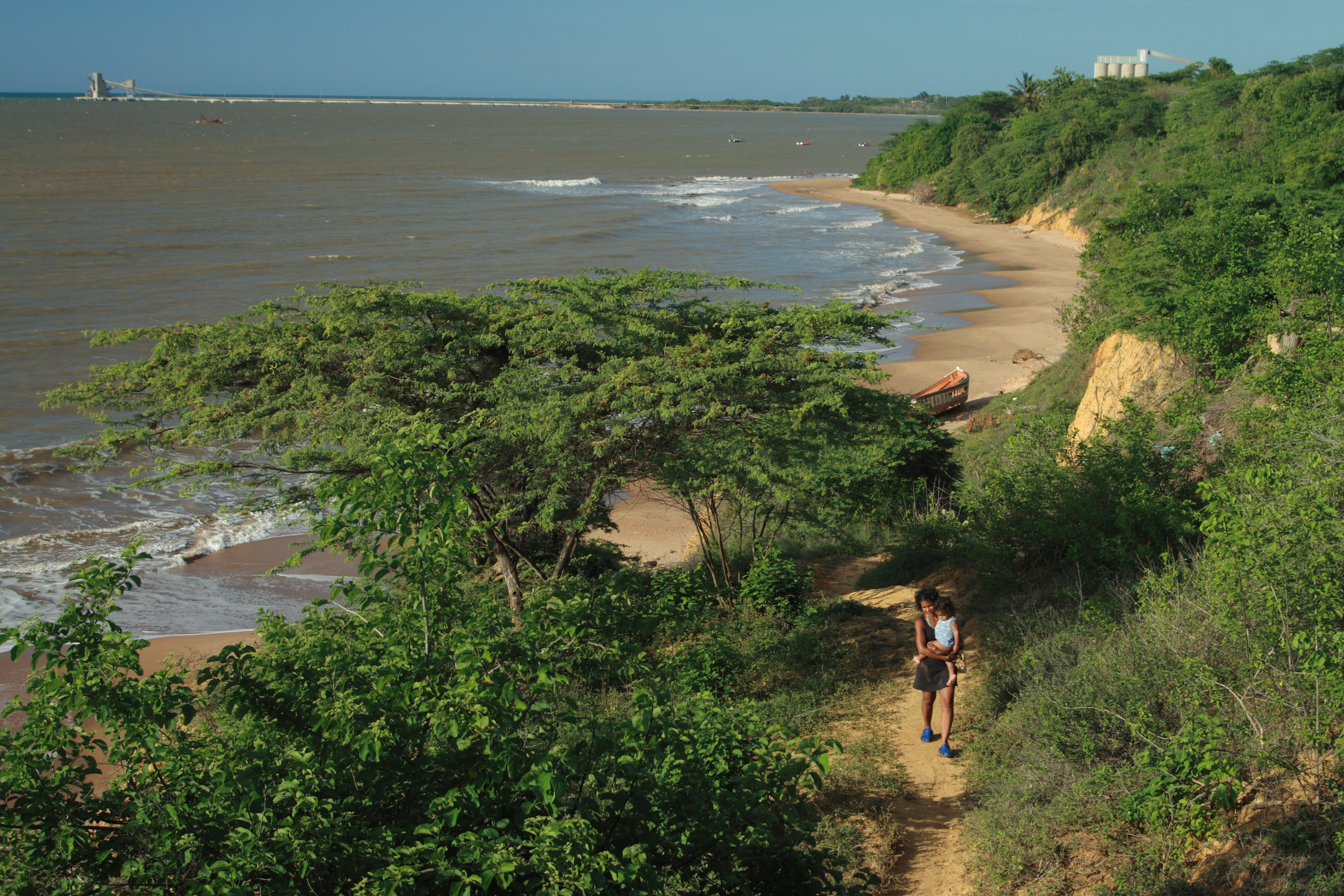
Puerto Cumarebo, Falcón State

Other medium-sized cities structure their respective areas of influence, highlighting Puerto Cumarebo (22 047 inhabitants), Dabajuro (15 269 inhabitants), Tucacas (12 970 inhabitants), Churuguara (10 800 inhabitants) and Mene de Mauroa (10 302 inhabitants). Moreover, according to the last population census conducted by the National Institute of Statistics in 2011, 55.7% of the population is ethnically recognized as mestizo; 38.9% as Caucasian, concentrated mainly in the city of Punto Fijo; and 4.1% identified themselves as black.

=== Race and ethnicity ===
According to the 2011 Census, the estimated racial composition of the population was:

| Racial composition | Est. Pop. | % |
|---|---|---|
| Mestizo | 513,000 | 55.7 |
| White | 358,000 | 38.9 |
| Black | 44,000 | 4.8 |
| Other race | 6,000 | 0.6 |

=== Main population centers ===
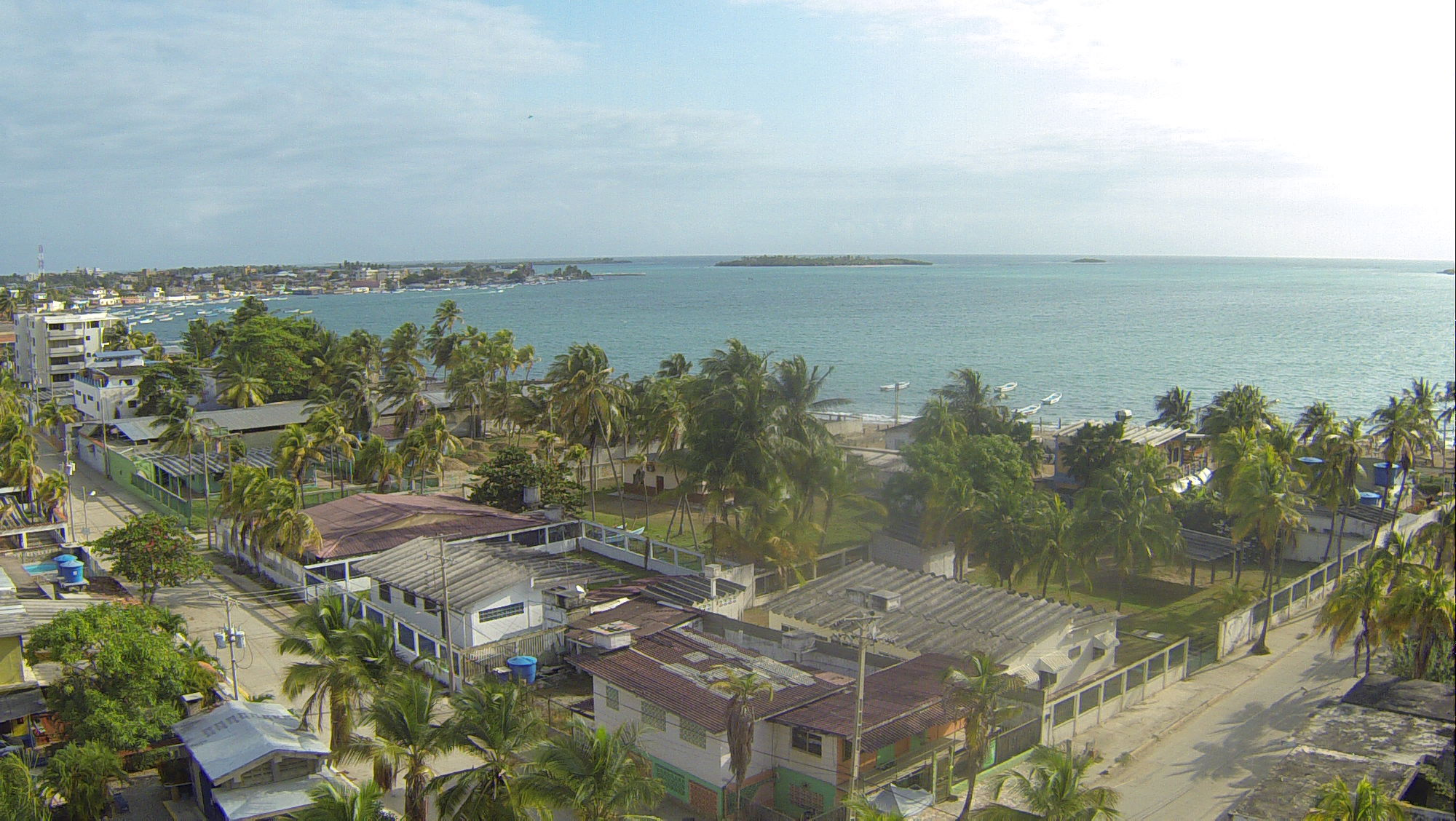
Chichiriviche is one of the best-known locations in Falcon

- Coro, the state capital, is the axis around which the political, cultural and social life of the region revolves. Founded on 26 July 1527. The first historical and religious capital of Venezuela. Declared a UNESCO World Heritage Site on 9 December 1993.
- La Vela de Coro, the place where the national flag was first raised. Fishing, commercial and artisanal community. Along with Coro, World Heritage Site.
- Mitare, a town in the west of the state, is a few kilometres from Coro. Its economy is based on the production of goats and shrimp fishing.
- Puerto Cumarebo, capital of the municipality of Zamora Called La Perla de Falcon, is a fishing, commercial, tourist, agricultural and artisanal zone.
- Punto Fijo, capital of the municipality Carirubana, located in the peninsula of Paraguaná. Commercial city, under the regime of Free Zone of Tourist Promotion and Investment since 1998, is the main economic, industrial, population and productive axis of Falcon. It is home to the Universidad de Falcon
- Punta Cardón, located in the peninsula of Paraguaná. It has the "Gustavo Riera" Zoo, the only zoo in the state.
- Santa Cruz de Los Taques, discovered in 1502 by Alonso de Ojeda, in this town is the bay of Amuay.
- Pueblo Nuevo, for many years was the largest population of the Paraguana Peninsula. Founded between 1730 and 1770, its economy is based on artisan activity, especially represented by local ceramists.
- Adícora, primary holiday resort in the Paraguaná peninsula, located 60 km north of Coro.
- Tocuyo de la Costa, a town located on the banks of the Tocuyo River in the municipality of Monseñor Iturriza.
- Tocópero, a town whose economy derives from livestock and crafts, also has a cement industry that covers the entire state.
- Tucacas, gateway to the state of Falcón on its eastern side. It is mainly a tourist and commercial town.
- Chichiriviche, the main tourist center of the Venezuelan northwest. Located on the eastern coast of the state, it gives access to Morrocoy National Park.
- Churuguara, capital of the municipality of Federación. The most important town in the Falcón mountain range, is mainly a tourist and agricultural town.
- Dabajuro, has the largest commercial movement of the western Falcon. It is a collection center for the trade of agricultural and livestock products.
- Mene de Mauroa, located 188 km west of Coro. Capital of the municipality of Mauroa, its economy is based on agricultural production.
- Mirimire, the population of the east of the state. Its economy is based on the production of cattle, tobacco, corn and sugar cane.
- Pedregal, capital of the municipality of Democracia. Cattle and artisan population of the Falconian west.
- San Juan de Los Cayos, located 169 km southeast of Coro. Potential producer of fish, bananas, avocado, coconut and cattle.
- Santa Cruz de Bucaral, capital of the Union municipality. It is one of the youngest towns in the Falcon Mountain Range.
- Capatárida, capital of the municipality Buchivacoa, located west of Coro. It has a great historical and cultural tradition, economic activity based on goat breeding and fishing.

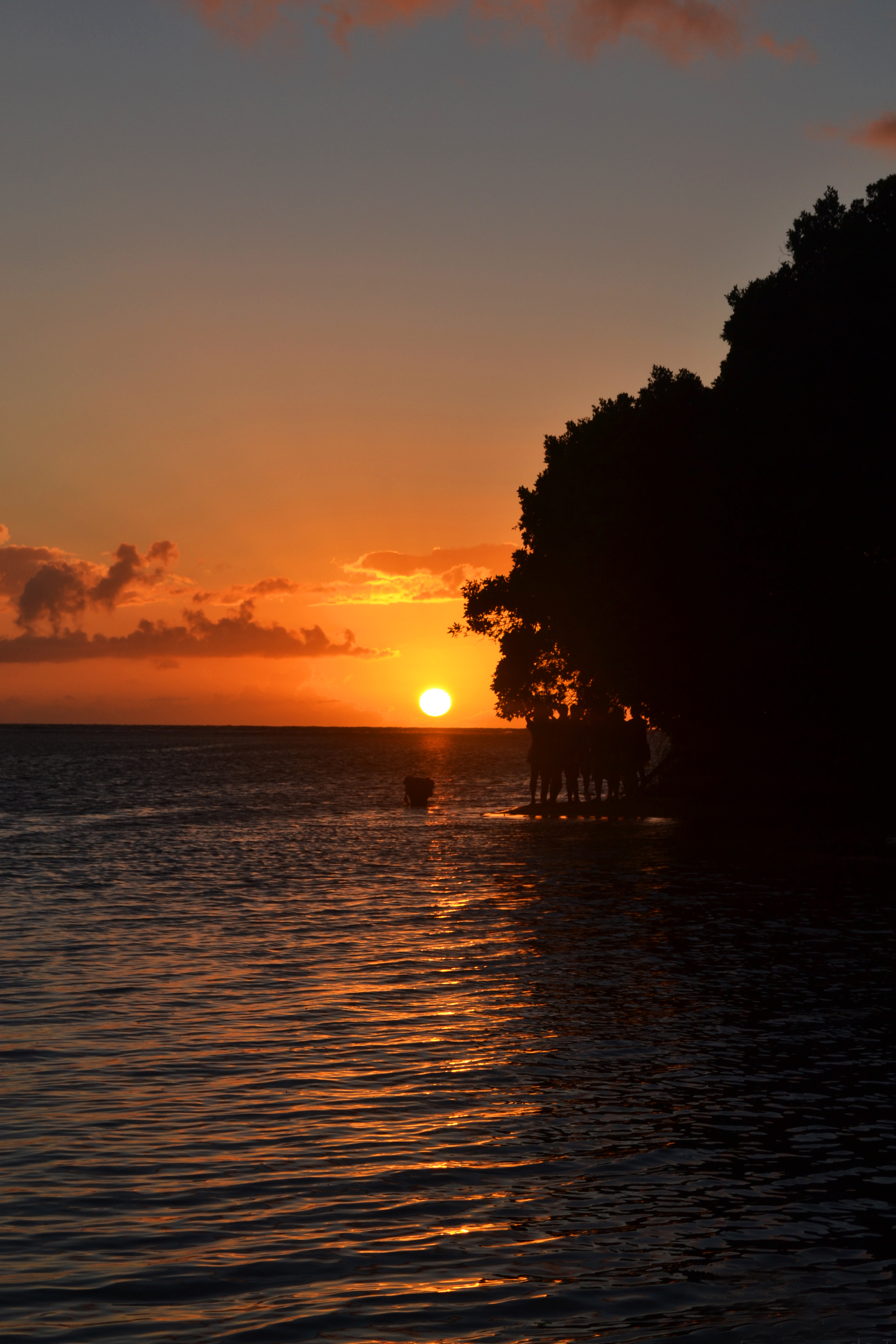
Adicora, Falcón State

- San Luis, a town located in the Sierra Falcon. It was initially inhabited by Jirajaras Indians.
- Cabure, the old settlement of Jirajaras Indians. It was founded in 1769.
- Curimagua, a valley in the Falcon Mountains. Cradle of the pre-independence movement led by the Zambo José Leonardo Chirino.
- Borojó, a population of indigenous origin in the municipality of Buchivacoa located west of Falcon.

== Economy ==
=== Economic resources ===
Its economic resources include;

- Livestock: poultry, cattle, goats and pigs.
- Fishing: Tuna, catfish, mackerel, corocoro and mullet (marine). Shrimp, crab and lobster, pepitonas and quigua (in) (mollusks).
- Agricultural products: Sugar cane, coconut, corn, melon, yam, ocumo and sorghum.
- Forest resources: Candlestick, cedar, cují, guamo, jabillo and vera.
- Mineral resources: Sand, limestone, coal, chromite, gravel, oil and phosphate rocks.

=== Agriculture and cattle raising ===
The main economic activity in terms of employment is agriculture, with important crops such as coconut, onions, corn, tomatoes, patilla, melon, coffee, aloe and legumes.

The state of Falcón is the largest producer of coconut and copra, goats and goat products. It is the second largest in the production of fish, paprika and vegetables such as onions, and third in bovine milk and melon production. It also has great advantages for the production of dry floor vegetables such as melon, onions, sideburns and tomatoes. Coconuts alone represent approximately 20,000 hectares in cultivation, and there is availability to expand surface area on the eastern coast of Falcón State. Falcón State is one of the main producers of aloe vera in Venezuela, and the coffee, region has 3500 hectares in cultivation, but with a provision of 12 700 hectares, distributed in the Sierra de Coro in the south of the federal entity.

In the mountains coffee is cultivated, having prestige the productions in the Sierra de San Luis and Sierra de Churuguara.

On the Eastern Coast, there are important plantations of coconut trees, which have developed an important industry of oil extraction and use of copra. As for livestock, there is an abundance of goats, cattle and, to a lesser extent, pigs.

=== Economic activities ===
Falcon is the Venezuelan state with the most kilometres of coast, therefore the fishing activity has special dimensions. The annual production is 30,471 tons of fish and seafood, landed in the ports of Las Piedras, Carirubana, Puerto Cumarebo, Zazárida, Chichiriviche, and La Vela de Coro, highlighting the industrialization of crustaceans with the presence on the coast of the state of shrimp farms, as in Boca de Ricoa and at various points of the Paraguaná peninsula.

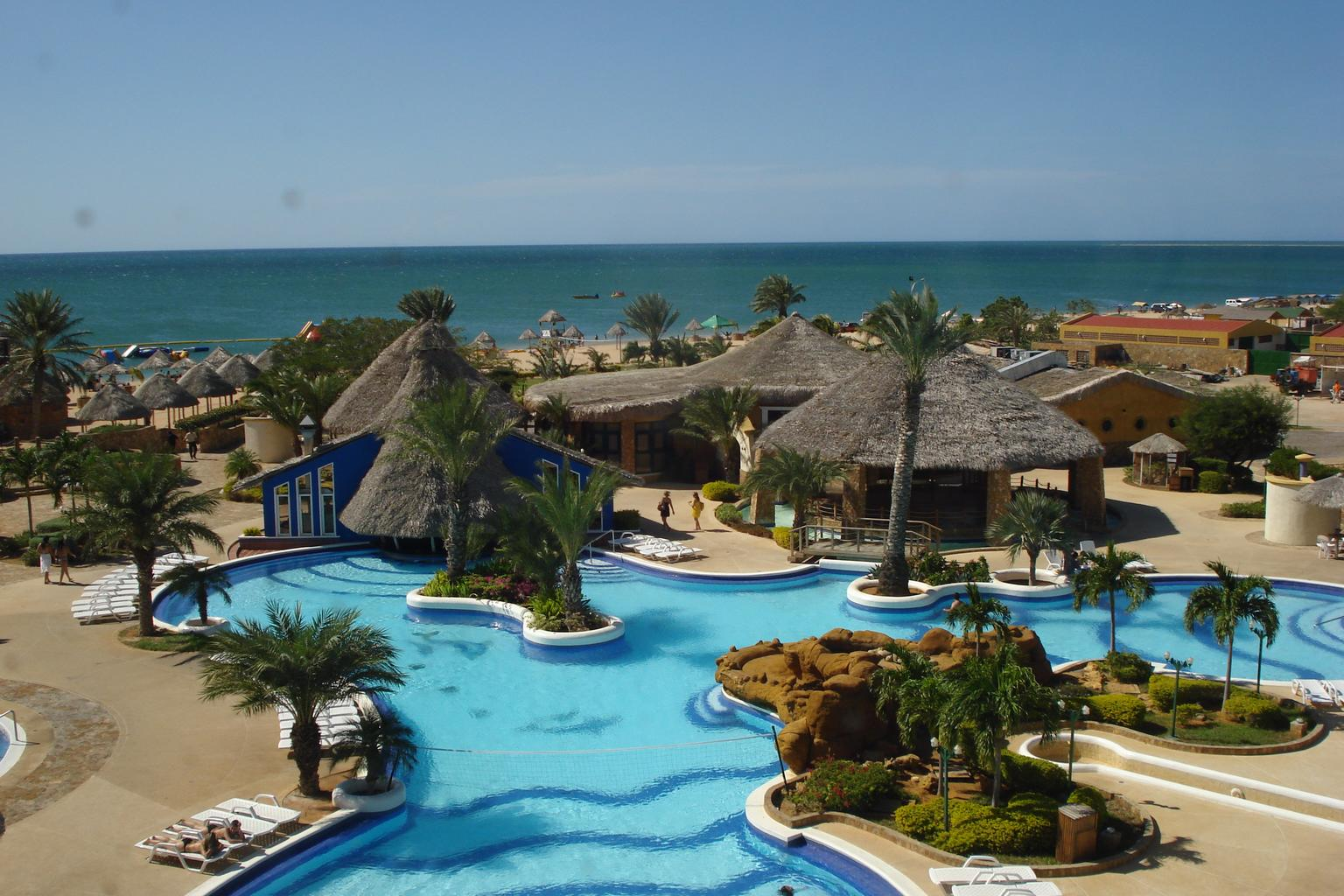
Villa Caribe Hotel, Paraguana, Falcon State

In Falcón, there are some working oil fields in Mene de Mauroa, Media, Hombre Pintado and Tiguaje and natural gas fields in Puerto Cumarebo and other nearby areas. However, most oil industry activity is in the Paraguaná Refining Center, one of the largest in the world, made up of the Amuay Refining Complex and the Cardón Refinery, both with a capacity of 940,000 barrels of oil per day, which represents 75% of Venezuela's total refining capacity. These refineries are fed with crude oil and gas through products coming from the Maracaibo Lake basin. Likewise, a tourist investment free zone has been consolidated in the Paraguaná peninsula.

Falcón also has mineral deposits to generate basic inputs for industries such as ceramics, fertilizers, energy, chemicals, abrasives, metalworking, pharmaceuticals, pottery, and paint, among others. Phosphates are exploited in Riecito and limestone in Chichiriviche, which are processed at the Cumarebo cement plant (Holcim de Venezuela). It also has immense coal deposits in the western zone, with proven reserves for open-pit mining in the order of 20 million metric tons, and reserves estimated at 120 million metric tons, within a radius of action of 50,000 hectares. Other minerals in the area include graphite, silica, limestone, dolomite, phosphate, chromite and marble.

Thanks to the dry and arid climate, there are five natural salt flats and some 220,000 hectares of land suitable for the construction of artificial salt flats spread throughout the Falconian territory. Of all the salt mines, only the Las Cumaraguas salt mine is under industrial exploitation, the rest being exploited by hand.

Also, thanks to its natural landscapes (like the Medanos de Coro and the National Parks Cueva de la Quebrada del Toro, Sierra de San Luis and Morrocoy) tourism is gaining importance in the economy of the State.

== Infrastructure ==
The region is mostly coastal lowlands and the northern Andean mountain hills, and is mostly dry with limited agriculture production. Farming mostly occurs in river valleys and mountainous areas, and includes maize, coconut, sesame, coffee and sugar cane.

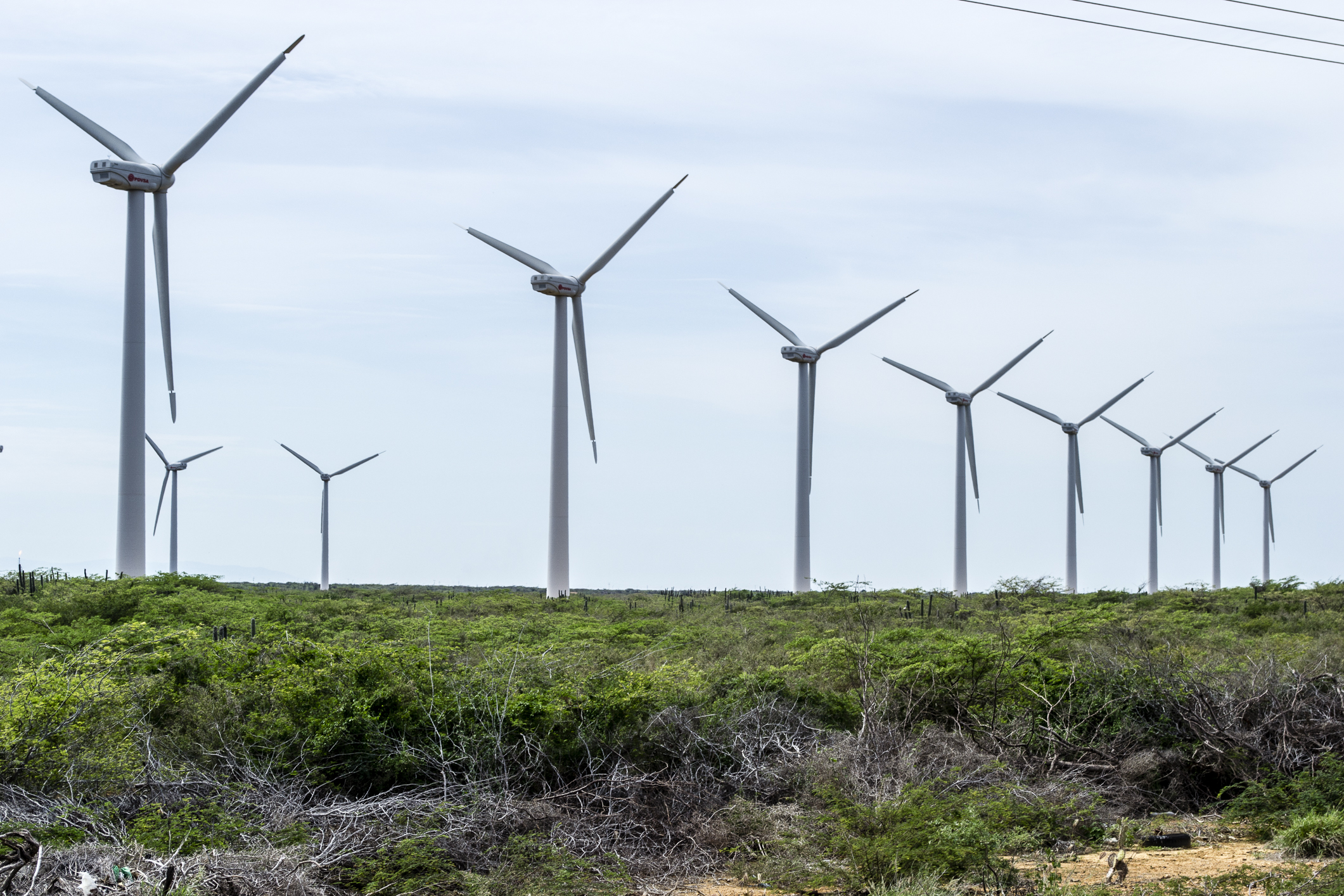
Wind farm in the Paraguaná peninsula, Falcón State

Coro, the state capital and the Paraguaná Peninsula have had significant amounts of industrialization and growth. Large oil refineries such as the Paraguana Refinery Complex in the city of Punto Fijo are located on the southwestern shore of the Paraguaná Peninsula, and approximately two-thirds of Venezuela's total oil production occurs in this area, much of which is exported via tanker ships that ship internationally through the port of Amuay.

== Tourism ==
=== National parks and monuments ===
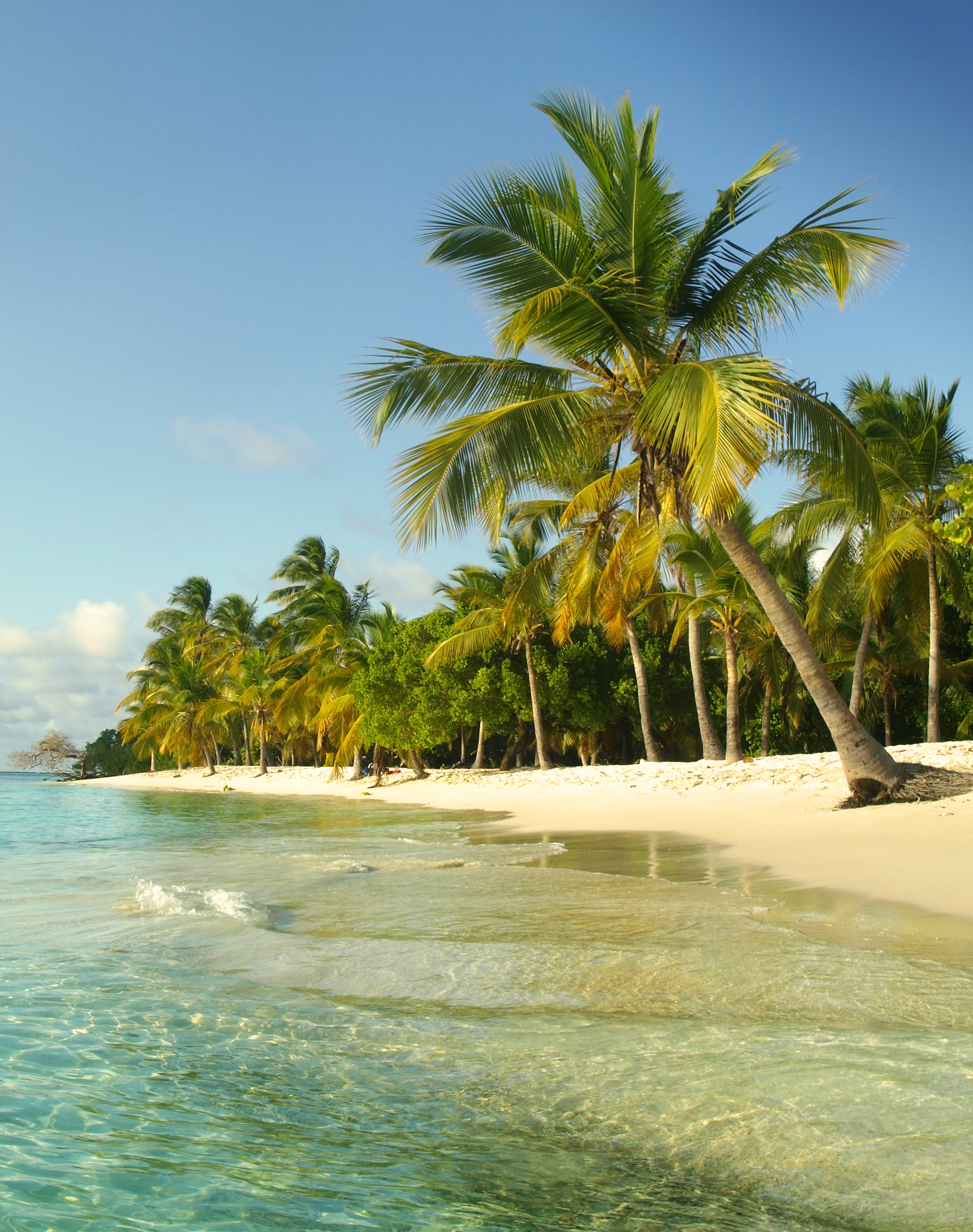
Cayo Sombrero, Morrocoy National Park

- Los Médanos de Coro National Park: Desert landscape located in the heart of the city of Coro. It has an area of 91 280 hectares.
- Morrocoy National Park: Made up of keys and islets of coral origin, white sand, turquoise sea and dense mangrove forests. It has an area of 32 090 hectares.
- National Park Cueva de la Quebrada del Toro: Located in the Falconian mountain range, it has an area of 4885 hectares.
- Juan Crisóstomo Falcón National Park: It has a great variety of natural attractions. It has an extension of 20,000 hectares.
- Cerro Santa Ana Natural Monument: Located in the center of Paraguaná. It has an area of 1900 hectares and an altitude of 850 meters above sea level. It was declared a Natural Monument on 14 June 1972.

=== Natural heritage ===
- Thermal waters of Cardón and Cuiva
- Guaibacoa Hot Springs
- Boca de Aroa Beach
- Adicora Beach
- Cumarebo Port Beach
- Tucacas Beaches
- Beaches in Chichiriviche
- Beaches of Morrocoy
- Manaure Well
- Tacarigua-Jatira Dam
- Hueque Falls
- Cuare Wildlife Refuge
- The Indian's Cave (Cueva del Indio)
- Haiton del Guarataro

=== Built heritage ===
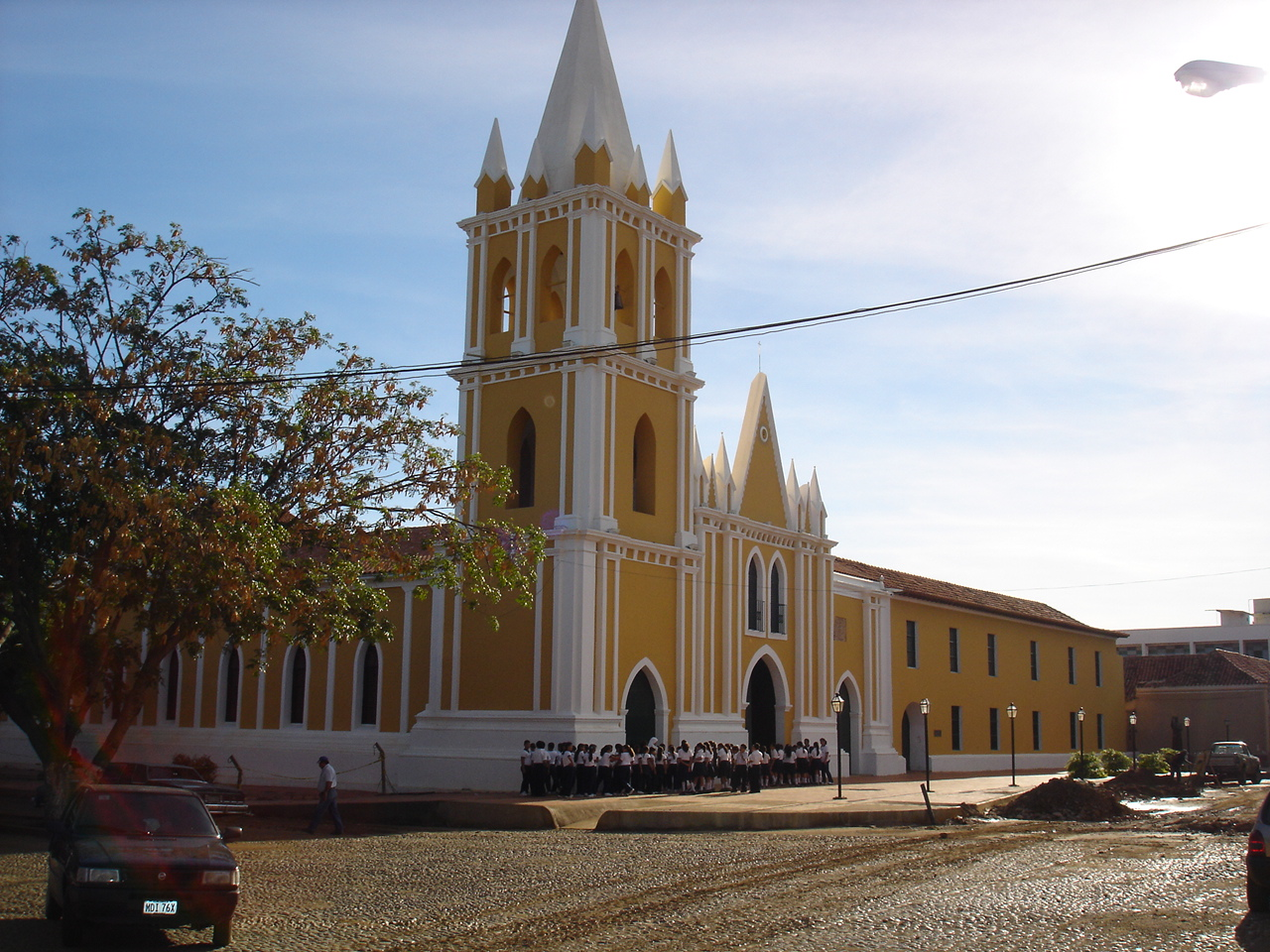
San Francisco Church, Coro, Falcon State

Paraguaná Zoological Park

- Paraguaná Zoological Park
- Athenaeum of Coro
- Cathedral Basilica Menor de Santa Ana
- Balcón de los Arcaya (Museum of Popular Pottery)
- Balcón Bolívar (Museum of Contemporary Art)
- House of 100 windows (Casa de las 100 ventanas)
- Casa de las Ventanas de Hierro
- Los Torres House
- House of the Sun (Casa del Sol)
- Treasury House (Casa del Tesoro)
- Alberto Henriquez House Museum (Choir Synagogue)
- Jewish cemetery in Coro
- San Clemente's Cross
- Church of San Nicolás de Bari
- San Clemente Church
- San Francisco Church
- Lucas Guillermo Castillo Diocesan Museum
- Elias David Curiel School of Music
- Hato Aguaque or Casa de Josefa Camejo
- Taima Taima Archaeological and Paleontological Museum

== Culture ==
=== Handicrafts ===
Falconian craftsmanship is rich in artistic expression. Within the popular handicrafts are the hammocks with unique styles, techniques and values of the state. The craft production is large and varied. The craftsmen of the towns that surround the city of Coro specialize in the manufacture of furniture with the wood of the cardon, the stick of Arch and the curarí. The wood is complemented using vegetable fibres such as sisal or with cow and goat skins. In Paraguaná the clay is worked to build objects for current domestic use, applying the same techniques used by the Caquetíos Indians. On the eastern coast, the attraction is the basketwork made with bulrush, cocuiza and vines and the hammocks made with thread.

=== Gastronomy ===
The typical Falconian food allows the enjoyment of a variety of flavors represented in its specialities, such as goat talkarí, celce coriano, goat milk cheese, custard, peeled arepa and goat milk candy. At a national level, rice with coconut and rice pudding is one of the most popular sweets, especially during the Easter season.

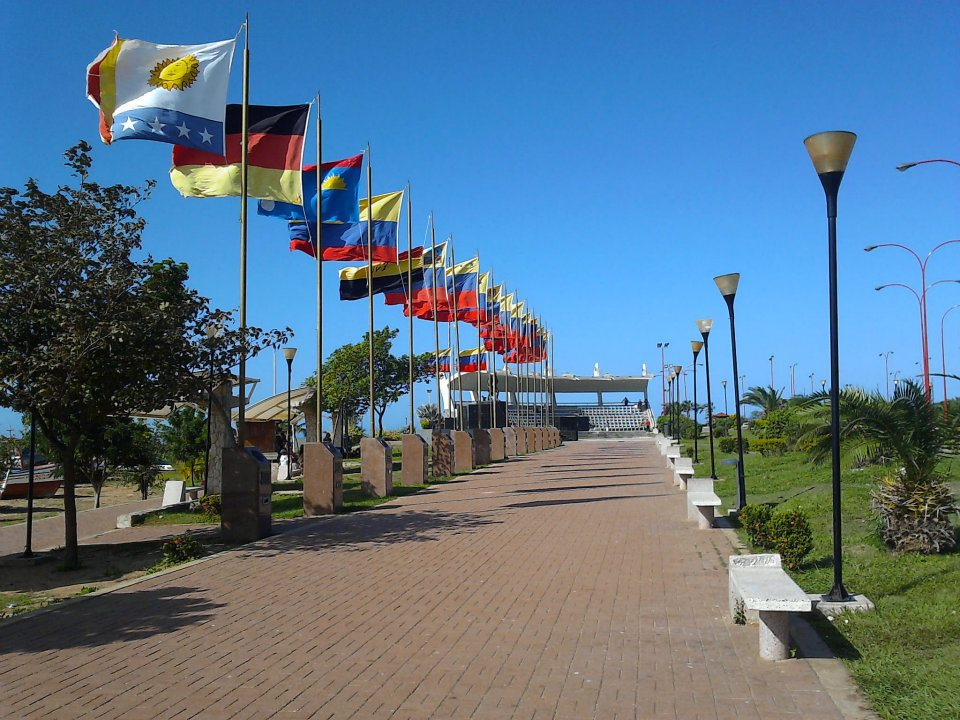
Flag Monument in La Vela de Coro, Falcón State

=== Folklore ===
Folkloric, traditional and religious expressions offer a seal of originality in the state. In typical celebrations, features of African, indigenous and European cultures are associated. Among these celebrations is the Baile de las Turas, which has its origin in an indigenous dance related to the hunting season and the harvesting of the corn crop. It is celebrated in San Pedro, El Tural and Mapararí in the mountain region, between 23 and 24 September. The drum dances in the cities of Coro, La Vela and Puerto Cumarebo are very joyful and colourful, and the celebration of the Day of the Mad (28 December) in La Vela de Coro, with masked parades in the streets and public squares, reaches a display similar to that of the great carnivals of the world.

== Sports ==
- Unión Atlético Falcón (Second Division of Venezuela): a professional football club based in the city of Punto Fijo, Falcon State, Venezuela. It was founded in 2006, in the city of Santa Ana de Coro.
- Cachorros de Falcón (Bolivarian National Baseball League): It is one of the teams that has remained since the birth of the Bolivarian National Baseball League 15 years ago, which was champion of the Central Western Region on a couple of occasions, in 2012 by the hand of former professional baseball player Yony Naveda, and in 2016, under the helm of Roberto Chirinos, the latter, who is again in charge of the Westerners in 2019.

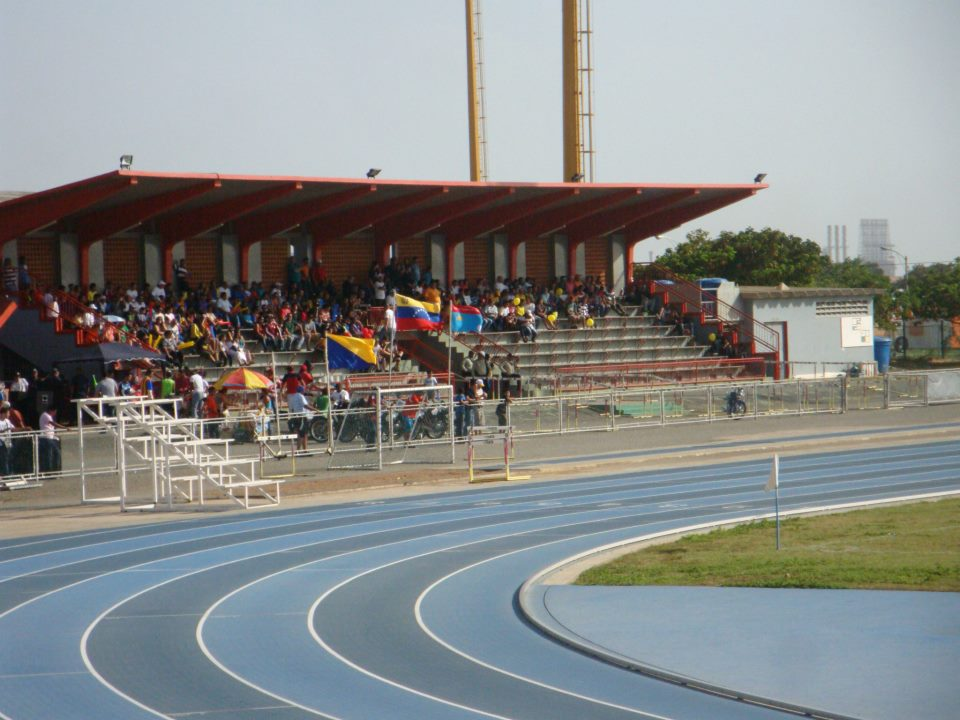
Polideportivo Manaure

=== Sports facilities ===
- Pedro Conde Stadium
- José David Ugarte Stadium
- Eduardo "Tata" Amaya Stadium
- Carlos Sanchez Covered Gym
- Fenelon Diaz Covered Gym
- Ramon Pena Gilly Gym

== See also ==
- States of Venezuela
- List of Venezuela state legislatures
