= José Laurencio Silva Municipality =

Municipality in Falcón, Venezuela

José Laurencio Silva Municipality Municipio José Laurencio Silva
- Municipality
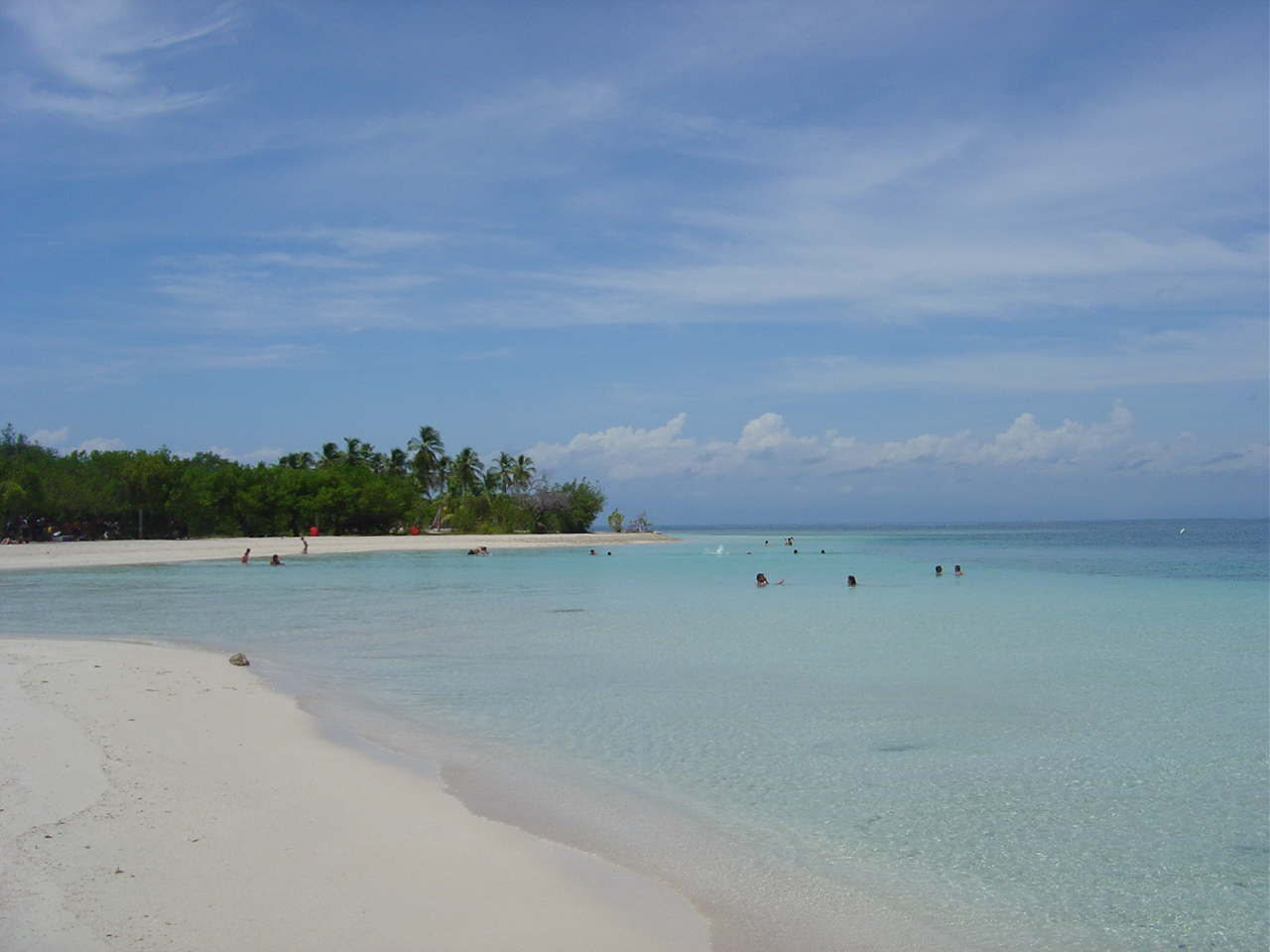

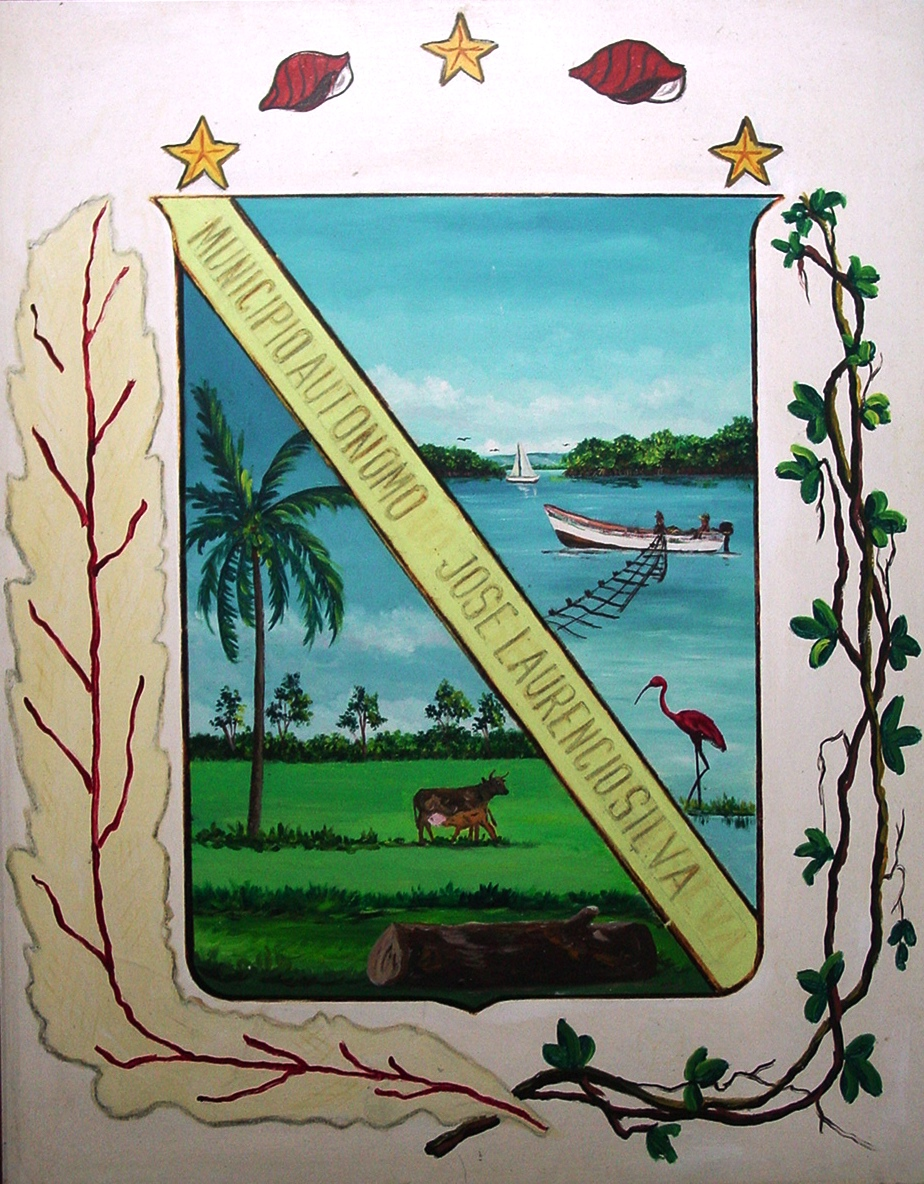
- Flag Seal

- Location in Falcón

- Location in Venezuela
- Country: Venezuela
- State: Falcón
- Founded: 1989
- Municipal seat: Tucacas

Government
  - Mayor: Osnel Arnias (UNT)

Area
  - Total: 902.1 km^{2} (348.3 sq mi)

Population (2023)
  - Total: 47,885
  - Density: 53.08/km^{2} (137.5/sq mi)
- Time zone: UTC−4 (VET)

José Laurencio Silva Municipality is located in Falcón state, Venezuela. The municipality has a total surface of 537 km^{2} and it has some 47,885 inhabitant (2023 census). Its capital is Tucacas.
