= Mauroa Municipality =

Municipality in Falcón, Venezuela

Mauroa Municipality Municipio Mauroa
- Municipality
- Flag Seal

- Location in Falcón

- Location in Venezuela
- Country: Venezuela
- State: Falcón
- Founded: 1918
- Municipal seat: Mene de Mauroa

Government
  - Mayor: Romer Vicierra Mármol (PSUV)

Area
  - Total: 2,180.8 km^{2} (842.0 sq mi)

Population (2023)
  - Total: 34,649
  - Density: 15.888/km^{2} (41.150/sq mi)
- Time zone: UTC−4 (VET)

Mauroa Municipality is located in Falcón state, Venezuela. The municipality has a total surface of 1904 km^{2} and it has some 34,649 inhabitant (2023 census). Its capital is Mene de Mauroa.
