= Federación Municipality =

Municipality in Falcón, Venezuela

Federación Municipality Municipio Federación
- Municipality
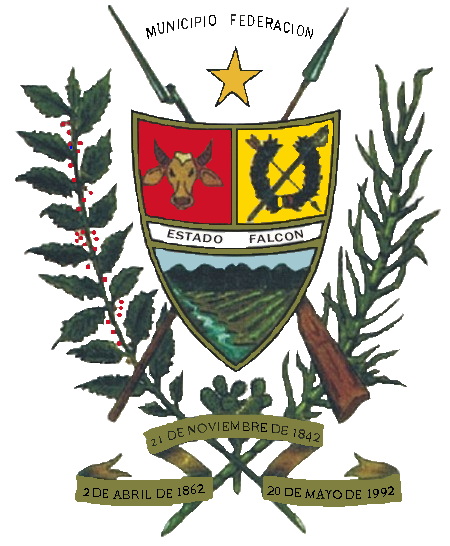
- Flag Seal

- Location in Falcón

- Location in Venezuela
- Country: Venezuela
- State: Falcón
- Municipal seat: Churuguara

Government
  - Mayor: Jean Salero Morillo (PSUV)

Area
  - Total: 1,350.3 km^{2} (521.4 sq mi)

Population (2023)
  - Total: 32,423
  - Density: 24.012/km^{2} (62.190/sq mi)
- Time zone: UTC−4 (VET)

Federación Municipality is located in Falcón state, Venezuela. The municipality has a total surface of 1084 km^{2} and it has some 32,423 inhabitant (2023 census). Its capital is Churuguara.
