= Unión Municipality =

Municipality in Falcón, Venezuela

Unión Municipality Municipio Unión
- Municipality
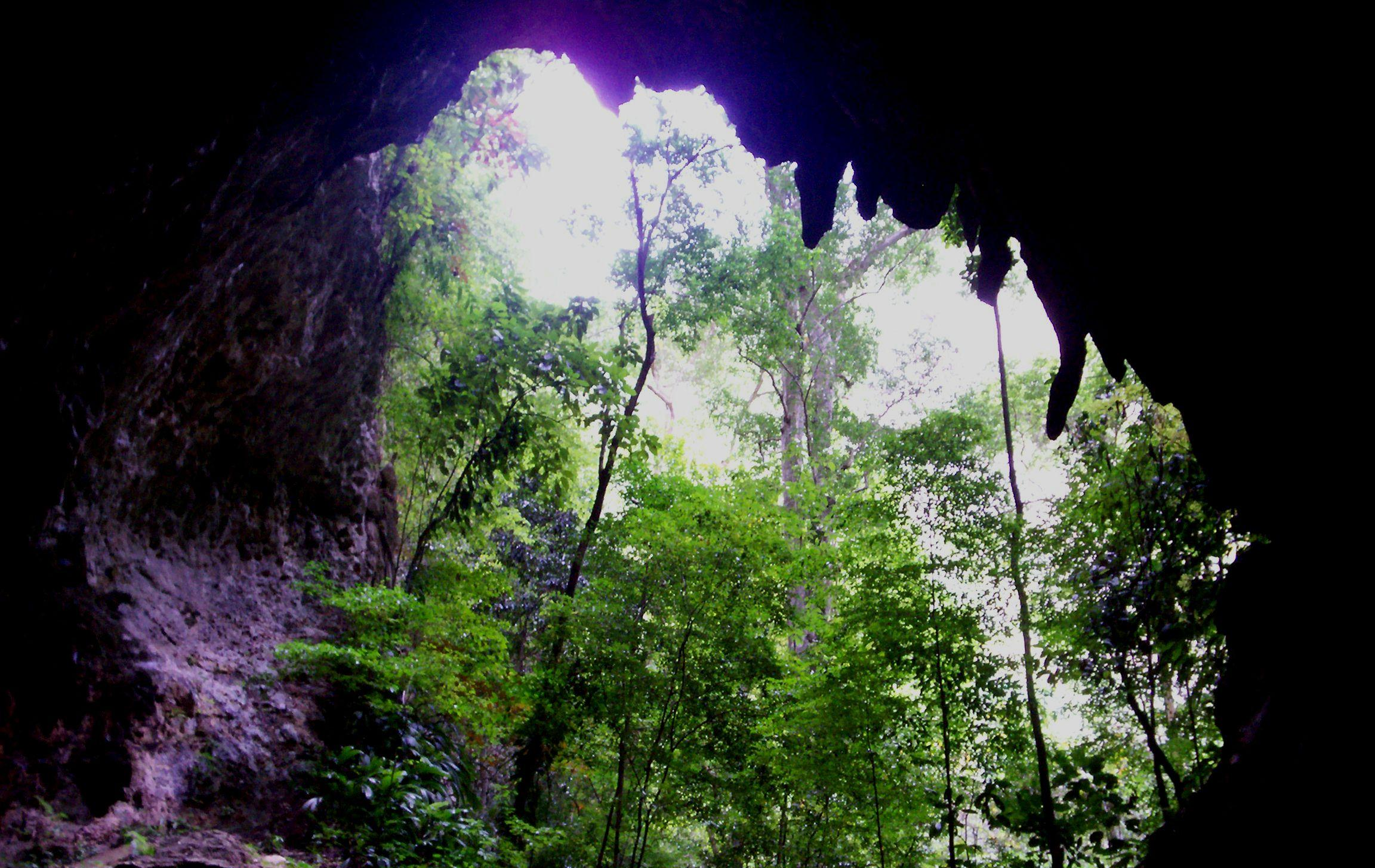

- Flag Seal

- Location in Falcón

- Location in Venezuela
- Country: Venezuela
- State: Falcón
- Founded: 1989
- Municipal seat: Santa Cruz de Buracal

Government
  - Mayor: Nelly Arteaga (PSUV)

Area
  - Total: 1,145.3 km^{2} (442.2 sq mi)

Population (2011)
  - Total: 18,136
  - Density: 15.835/km^{2} (41.013/sq mi)
- Time zone: UTC−4 (VET)

Unión Municipality is located in Falcón state, Venezuela. The municipality has a total surface of 975 km^{2} and it has some 18,136 inhabitant (2011 census). Its capital is Santa Cruz de Buracal.
