= Churuguara =

City in Falcón State, Venezuela

- Location within Venezuela
- Coordinates: 10°48′46″N 69°37′6″W
- Country: Venezuela
- State: Falcón
- Municipality: Federación Municipality

Churuguara (Spanish pronunciation: [t͡ʃu.ɾuˈɣ̞wa.ɾa]) is the capital city of Federación Municipality in southern Falcón State, Venezuela.

It has a height of 936 m (3,070 ft) and an average daytime temperature of 22.7 °C (72.86 °F). With a population of 10,800, it is the largest population center of the Sierra de Falcón, measured in the 2000 census.

Churuguara is primarily agricultural, with emphasis on cattle, coffee and vegetable crops. One of its most traded dairy products is its reputed cheese, but also has mineral resources such as clay and siliceous sandstones which are used in handicrafts.

The city has a small airport with a code of IATA: SVHH.

== Sources ==
- Vila, Marco Aurelio (1978). Antecedentes Coloniales de Centros Poblados de Venezuela. Universidad Central de Venezuela. ISBN 980-07-0026-9
- Pueblos de Venezuela – Churuguara (Spanish)
