= Palmasola Municipality =

Municipality in Falcón, Venezuela

Palmasola Municipality Municipio Palmasola
- Municipality
- Flag

- Location in Falcón

- Location in Venezuela
- Country: Venezuela
- State: Falcón
- Founded: 1992
- Municipal seat: Palmasola

Government
  - Mayor: Giussepe Palmieri Inglese (PSUV)

Area
  - Total: 255.0 km^{2} (98.5 sq mi)

Population (2011)
  - Total: 7,077
  - Density: 27.75/km^{2} (71.88/sq mi)
- Time zone: UTC−4 (VET)

Palmasola Municipality is located in Falcón state, Venezuela. The municipality has a total surface of 194 km^{2} and it has some 7,077 inhabitant (2011 census). Its capital is Palmasola.
