= Cueva de la Quebrada del Toro =

Cave in Venezuela containing a river

Cueva de Quebrada del Toro
- IUCN category II (national park)
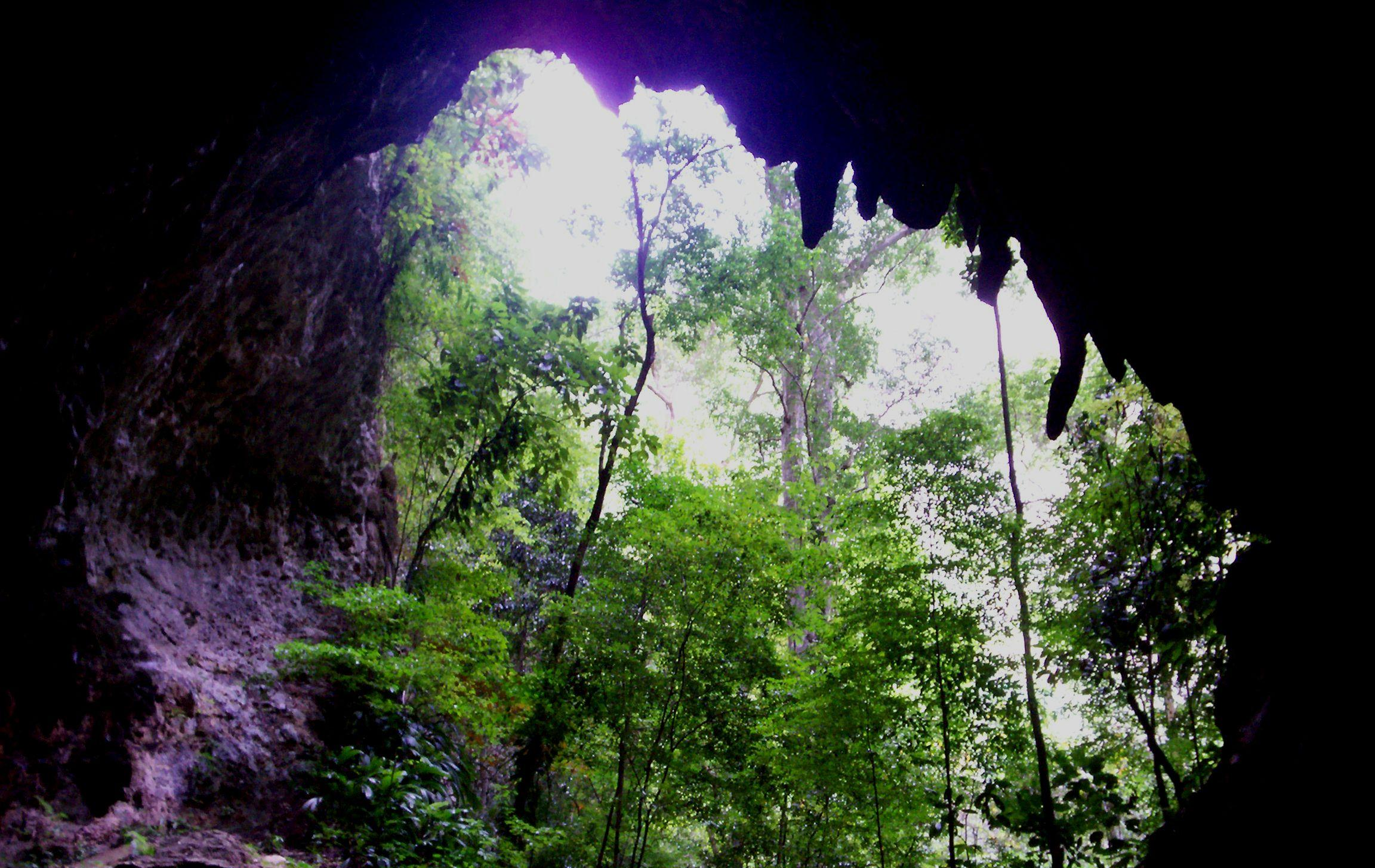

- Location within Venezuela
- Nearest city: Santa Cruz de Bucaral
- Coordinates: 10.83213°N 69.01358°W
- Area: 4,885 km^{2} (1,886 sq mi)
- Established: 21 March 1961
- Governing body: Inparques

The Cueva de la Quebrada del Toro is a cave in the Sierra de Falcón in Falcón State, Venezuela. It is an active river cave, through which flows the largest known underground watercourse in Venezuela. It is protected as the Cueva de la Quebrada del Toro National Park.

== Wildlife ==
Like the Cueva del Guácharo National Park, it has a population of oil-birds (steatornis caripensis).
