= Acosta Municipality, Falcón =

Acosta Municipality Municipio Acosta
- Municipality
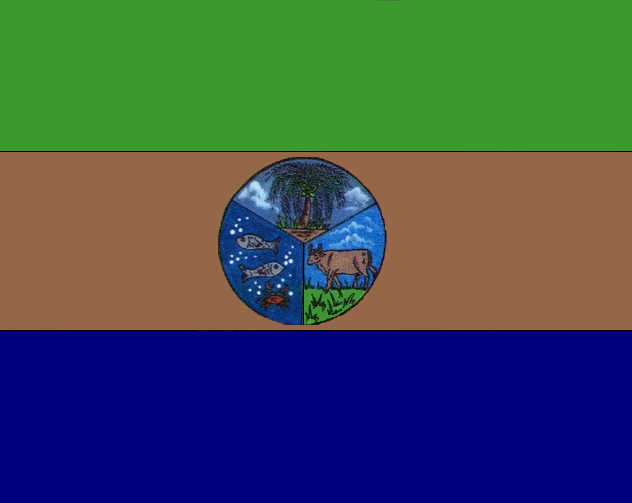
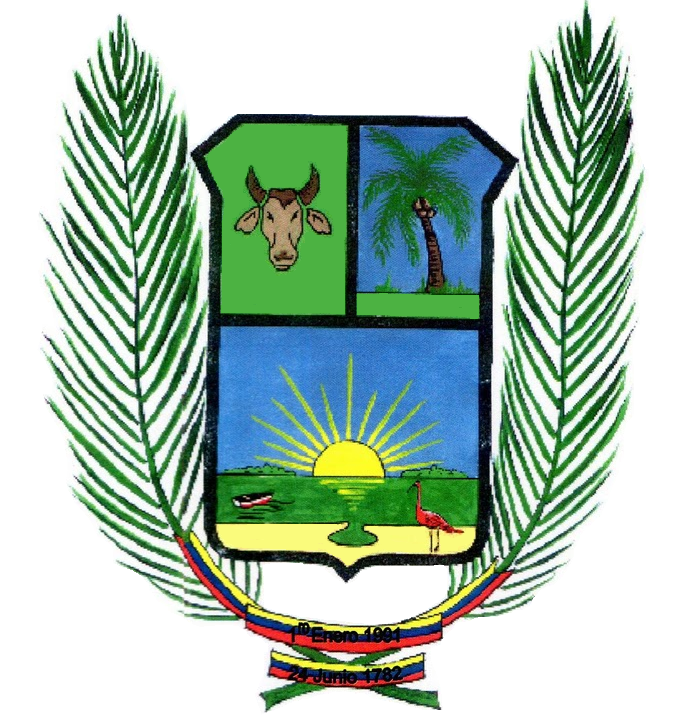
- Flag Coat of arms

- Location in Falcón

- Location in Venezuela
- Coordinates: 11°08′28″N 68°29′44″W
- Country: Venezuela
- State: Falcón
- Municipal seat: San Juan de los Cayos[*]

Government
  - Mayor: Froylan Merentes Gouverneur (PSUV)

Population (2001)
  - Total: 17,078
- Time zone: UTC−4 (VET)

Acosta Municipality is a municipality in Falcón State, Venezuela.
