= San Francisco Municipality, Falcón =

Municipality in Falcón, Venezuela

San Francisco Municipality Municipio San Francisco
- Municipality
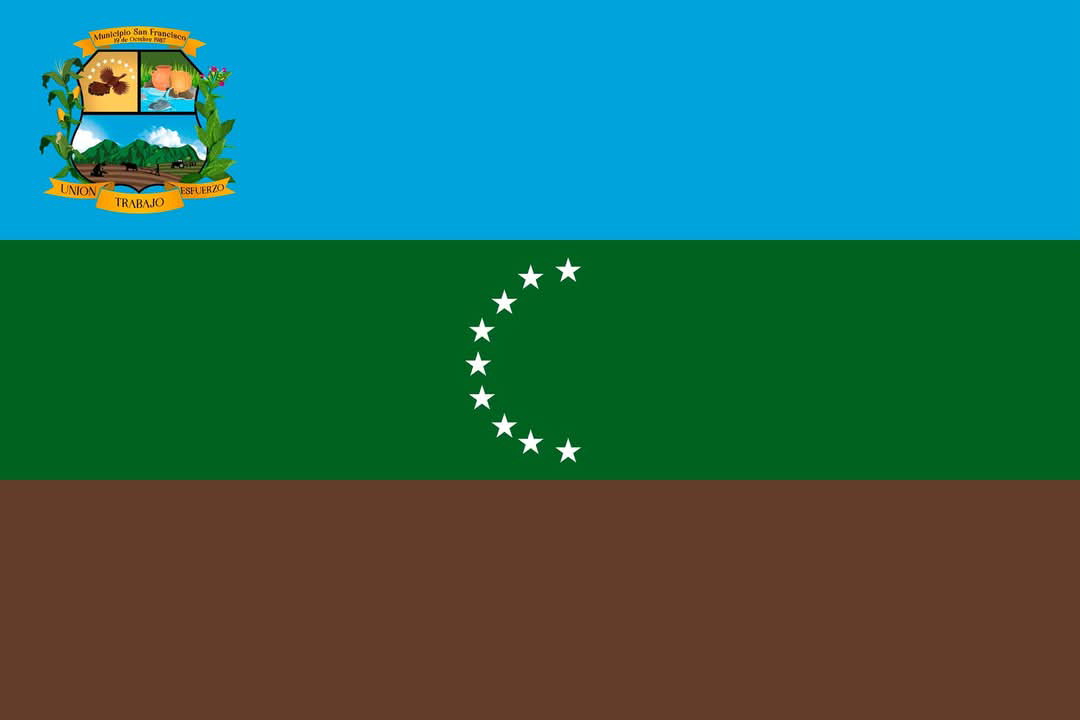
- Flag Seal

- Location in Falcón

- Location in Venezuela
- Country: Venezuela
- State: Falcón
- Municipal seat: Mirimire

Government
  - Mayor: Carlos Escalona Rodríguez (MUD)

Area
  - Total: 270.4 km^{2} (104.4 sq mi)

Population (2011)
  - Total: 12,562
  - Density: 46.46/km^{2} (120.3/sq mi)
- Time zone: UTC−4 (VET)

San Francisco Municipality is located in Falcón state, Venezuela. The municipality has a total surface of 346 km^{2} and it has some 12,562 inhabitant (2011 census). Its capital is Mirimire.
