= Carirubana Municipality =

Carirubana
- Municipality
- Flag Coat of arms

- Location in Falcón
- Coordinates: 11°42′31″N 70°0′20″W
- Country: Venezuela
- State: Falcón
- Seat: Punto Fijo
- Parishes: 4

Government
  - Type: Municipal Council
  - Mayor: Luis Piña Peña (PSUV)

Area
  - Total: 684 km^{2} (264 sq mi)

Population (2011)
  - Total: 239,444
- Website: www.carirubana-falcon.gob.ve

Carirubana is a municipality in northwestern Venezuela. It is located on the Paraguaná Peninsula in Falcón State. It is divided into 4 parroquias (parishes), Parroquia Santa Ana, Parroquia Norte, Parroquia Carirubana, and Parroquia Urbana Punta Cardón. It is the most populous municipality in the state, as of 2011. Its shire town is Punto Fijo.

== See also ==
- Municipalities of Venezuela
- Coro region
