= Urdaneta Municipality, Lara =

Urdaneta Municipality Municipio Urdaneta
- Municipality
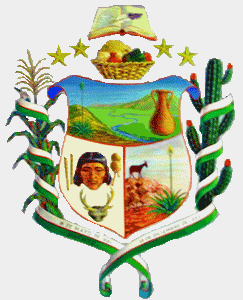
- Flag Coat of arms

- Location in Lara

- Location in Venezuela
- Coordinates: 10°34′42″N 69°32′12″W
- Country: Venezuela
- State: Lara
- Municipal seat: Siquisique[*]

Government
  - Mayor: Hamad Al Chaer El Chaer (PSUV)

Area
  - Total: 3,648.0 km^{2} (1,408.5 sq mi)

Population (2007)
  - Total: 63,213
  - Density: 17.328/km^{2} (44.880/sq mi)
- Time zone: UTC−4 (VET)
- Area code(s): 0253
- Website: Official website

Urdaneta is one of the nine municipalities (municipios) that make up the Venezuelan state of Lara and, according to a 2007 population estimate by the National Institute of Statistics of Venezuela, the municipality has a population of 63,213. The town of Siquisique is the municipal seat of the Urdaneta Municipality. The municipality is one of several in Venezuela named "Urdaneta Municipality" in honour of Venezuelan independence hero Rafael Urdaneta.

== Demographics ==
The Urdaneta Municipality, according to a 2011 population census by the National Institute of Statistics of Venezuela, has a population of 61,381 (up from 56,063 in 2000). This amounts to 3.5% of the state's population. The municipality's population density is 14.85 inhabitants per square kilometre (38.5/sq mi).

== Government ==
The mayor of the Urdaneta Municipality is Luis Gonzaga Ladino, elected on October 31, 2004, with 64% of the vote. He replaced Willians Ereu shortly after the elections. The municipality is divided into four parishes; Siquisique, Moroturo, San Miguel, and Xaguas.
