= Tocuyo River =

River in Venezuela

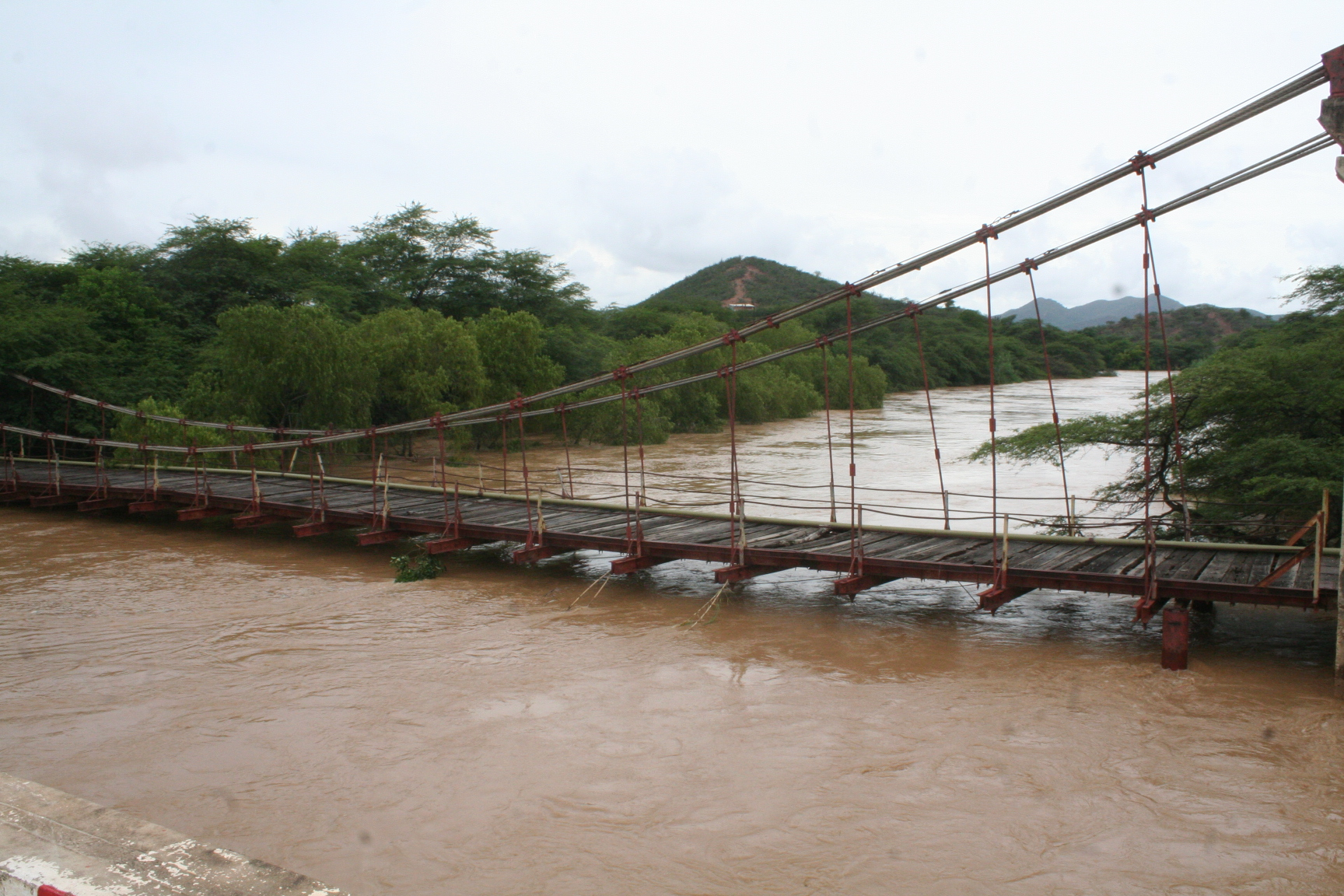
- Bridge over the Morere or Tocuyo river in Camacaro parroquia

- Mouth location in Venezuela
- Native name: Río Tocuyo (Spanish)

Location
- Country: Venezuela

Physical characteristics
- Mouth
  - coordinates: 11°03′29″N 68°20′16″W

The Tocuyo River (Spanish: Río Tocuyo) is a river of Venezuela. It drains into the Caribbean Sea.

The river drains part of the Lara-Falcón dry forests ecoregion.

== See also ==
- List of rivers of Venezuela
