= Paraguana xeric scrub =

Ecoregion in Venezuela

Paraguana xeric scrub (NT1313)
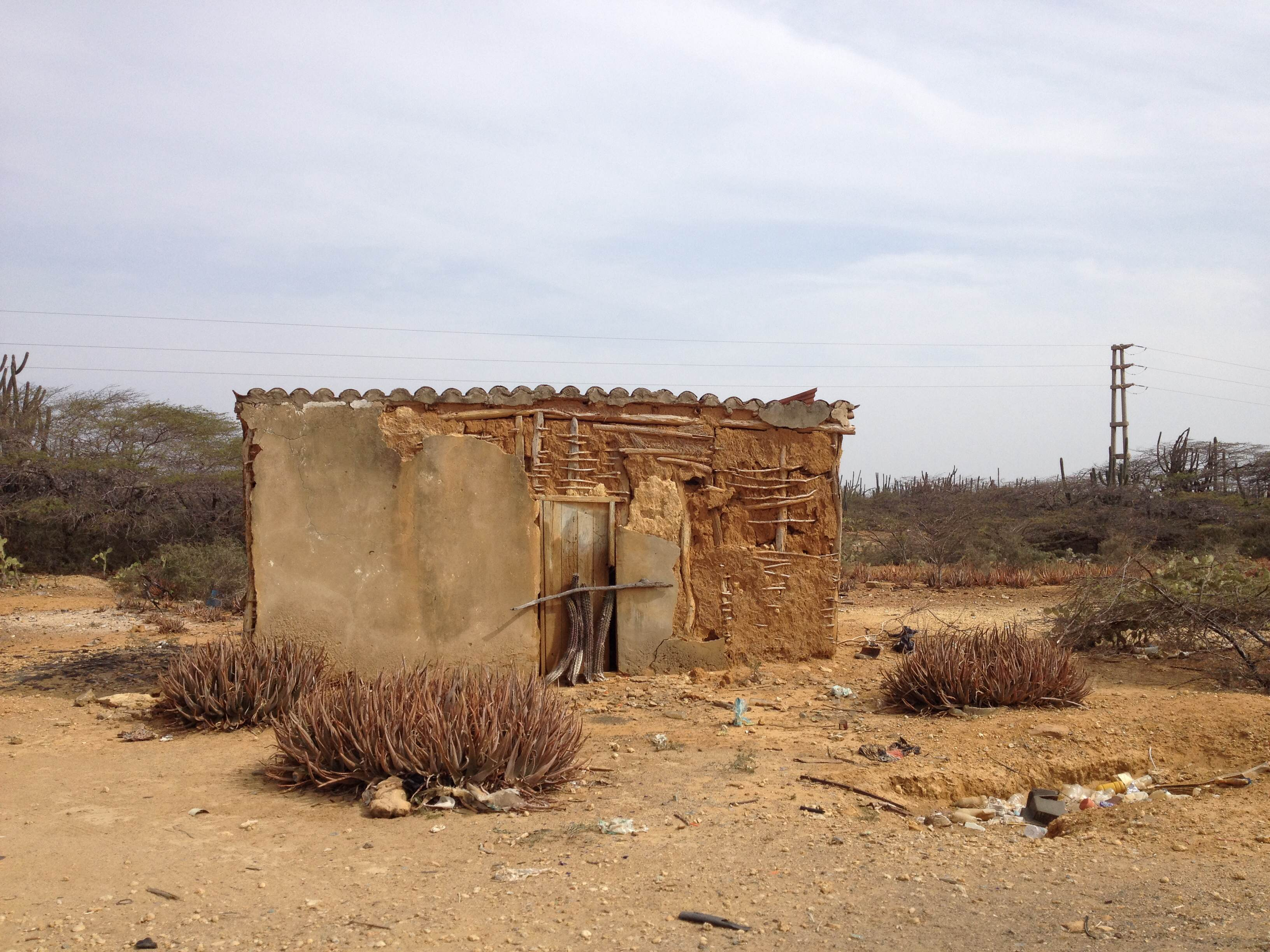
- Abandoned wattle and daub house on the Paraguaná Peninsula

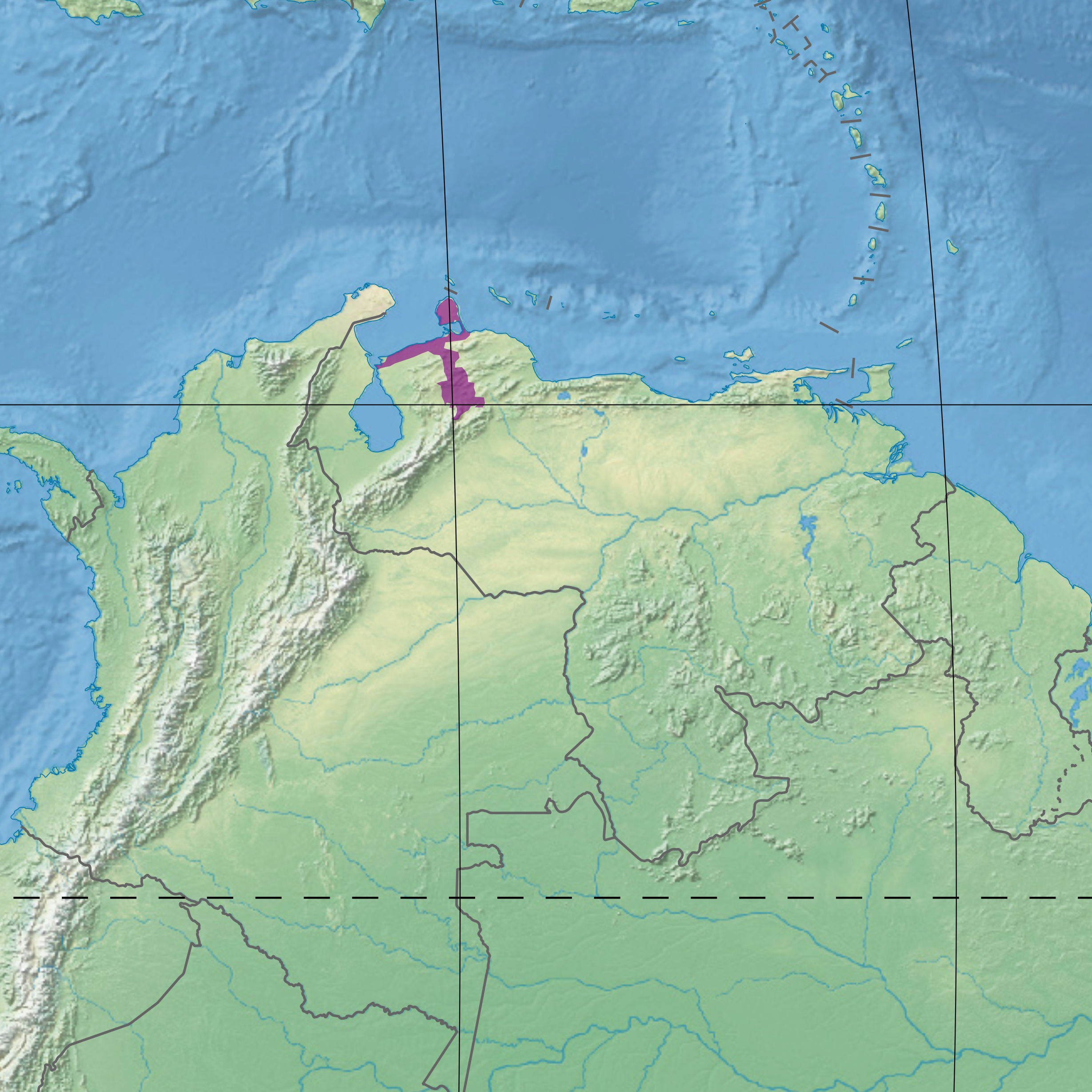
- Ecoregion territory (in purple)

Ecology
- Realm: Neotropical
- Biome: Deserts and xeric shrublands

Geography
- Area: 16,058 km^{2} (6,200 sq mi)
- Countries: Venezuela
- Coordinates: 11.059°N 70.079°W
- Climate type: BSh: arid, steppe, hot arid

The Paraguana xeric scrub (NT1313) is an ecoregion in Venezuela to the north and east of Lake Maracaibo and along the coast of Aruba, Bonaire, and Curaçao. The region holds flora and fauna adapted to the very dry conditions of the coastal dunes and inland areas of bush, scrub, briars and cacti. There are several endangered species of animals and birds. Efforts at protecting the environment have been ineffective. Most of the original trees have been cut down, dunes are being destabilized by loss of vegetation, scrub is replaced by farmland and vegetation is destroyed by grazing goats.

== Geography ==
=== Location ===
The Paraguana xeric scrub is in the northwest of Venezuela. It has an area of 1,605,792 hectares (3,968,000 acres). It extends along the Caribbean coast of the ABC islands (Leeward Antilles) to the east of the mouth of Lake Maracaibo and includes the Paraguaná Peninsula. A belt of the xeric scrub extends inland to the foothills of the Venezuelan Andes to the west of Barquisimeto.

Along the Caribbean coast there are stretches of Amazon-Orinoco-Southern Caribbean mangroves. To the east the ecoregion merges into the Lara-Falcón dry forests ecoregion, and to the west merges into the Maracaibo dry forests ecoregion. In the south it meets the northeastern section of the Venezuelan Andes montane forests. The southeastern extreme of the ecoregion connects to the La Costa xeric shrublands.

=== Terrain ===
The ecosystem includes the valleys of the Lara–Falcón depression in the coastal plains north of the foothills of the Venezuelan Andes, and the Paraguaná Peninsula. In the Pliocene epoch the peninsula was an island Paraguana has four marine terraces at 6 metres (20 ft), 15–20 metres (49–66 ft), 40–50 metres (130–160 ft) and 80 metres (260 ft) surrounding the Cerro Santa Ana inselberg. The 830 metres (2,720 ft) Cerro Santa Ana is the highest point in the hills of the center of the former island. The long, narrow and low Médanos Isthmus that joins Paraguana to the mainland was formed about 3,000 years ago by tectonic uplift. A 32 kilometres (20 mi) long ledge of exposed beach rock protects the eastern shore from strong wave action.

The shoreline mainly consists of sandy or sand and silt beaches, with murky waters. Dunes have formed recently from sand that continues to arrive from the Gulf of Venezuela. The valleys of the Lara–Falcón depression contains ancient Quaternary rocks and recent sediments, and include plains and hills between the Andes and the Venezuelan Coastal Range. The soils are high in salt, mainly calcite. Soils are sandy along the coast and sandy with clay content further inland. The soils are all low in organic matter and phosphorus, and have pH close to neutral.

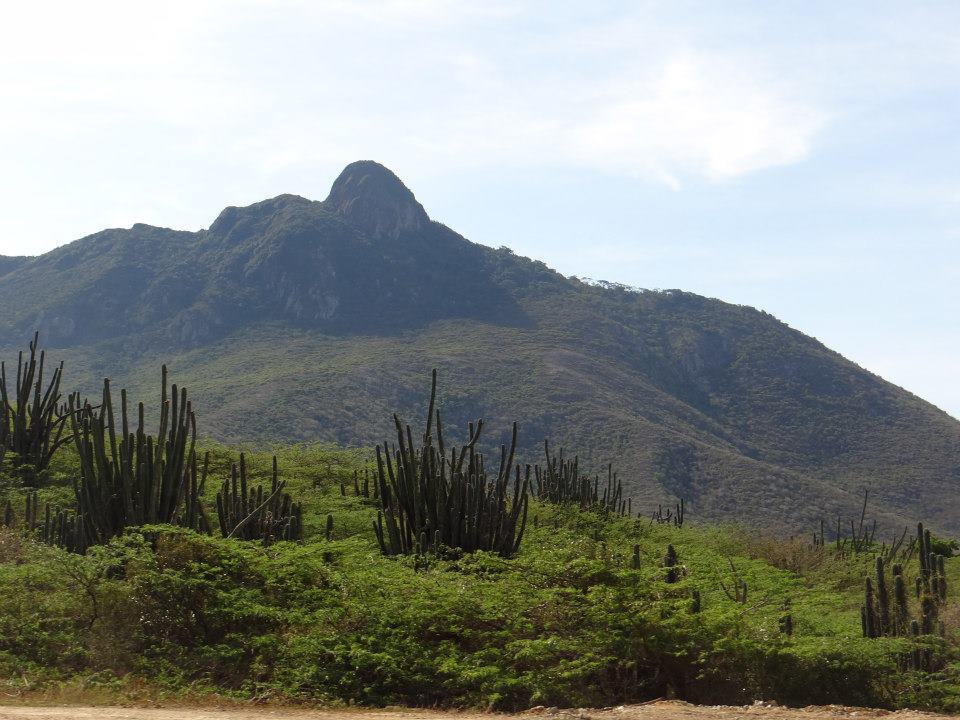
Cerro Santa Ana on Paraguana

The Paraguaná peninsula has only intermittent streams. On the mainland the Mitare River divides into the Pedregal and Paraíso rivers, which empty into the gulf of Coro. The Tocuyo River, which crosses the Lara–Falcón dry forest ecoregion, is formed by the confluence of the Morere, Barigua and Bucares rivers. It empties into the Caribbean near the Triste Gulf. The Turbio River is the largest in the Lara Falcón depression.

=== Climate ===
Annual rainfall on the Paraguaná Peninsula is usually less than 300 millimetres (12 in), while in the Lara–Falcón valleys it ranges from 350 millimetres (14 in) in dry areas to as much as 1,000 millimetres (39 in) in the foothills of the Andes. Ground-level temperatures may rise to 50 °C (122 °F) in the sun, but may fall to as low as 15 °C (59 °F) in the shade. The cause of the arid or semi-arid climate is unclear, but may be caused in part by the strong northeast trade winds blowing along the coast and by the contrast in thermal properties between the sea and the land.

At a sample location at coordinates 10.75°N 70.25°W the Köppen climate classification is "BSh": arid, steppe, hot arid. Mean monthly temperatures at this location range from 24.4 °C (75.9 °F) in January to 26.8 °C (80.2 °F) in August–September. Yearly total rainfall is about 680 millimetres (27 in). Monthly rainfall is 9.7 millimetres (0.38 in) in February, rising to 74.3 millimetres (2.93 in) in May, falling to 33.3 millimetres (1.31 in) in July and rising again to 141.9 millimetres (5.59 in) in October.

== Ecology ==
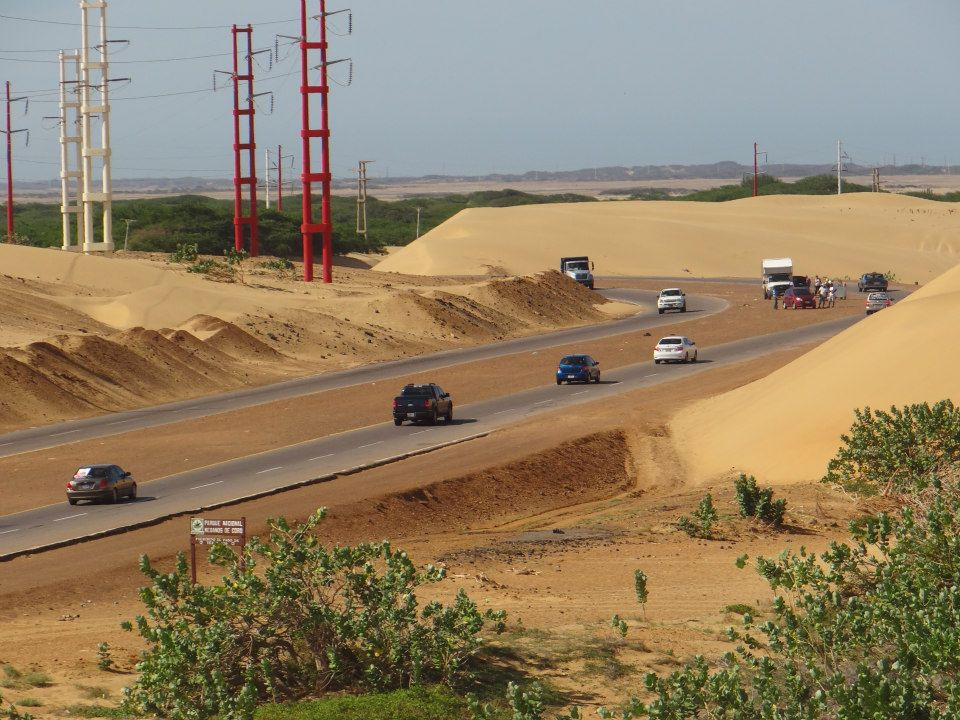
Médanos de Coro

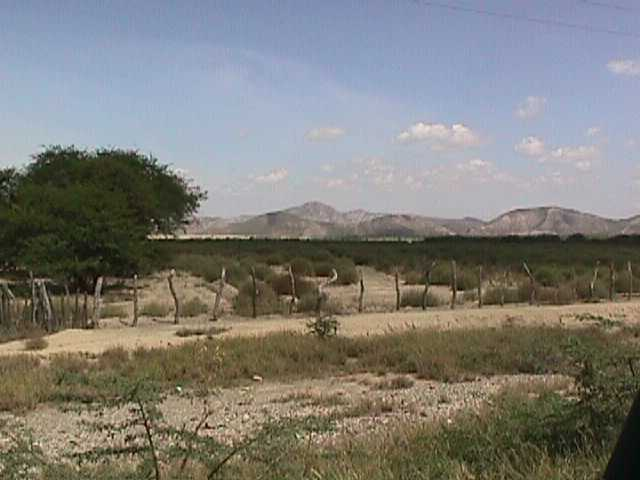
Cerro Saroche National Park

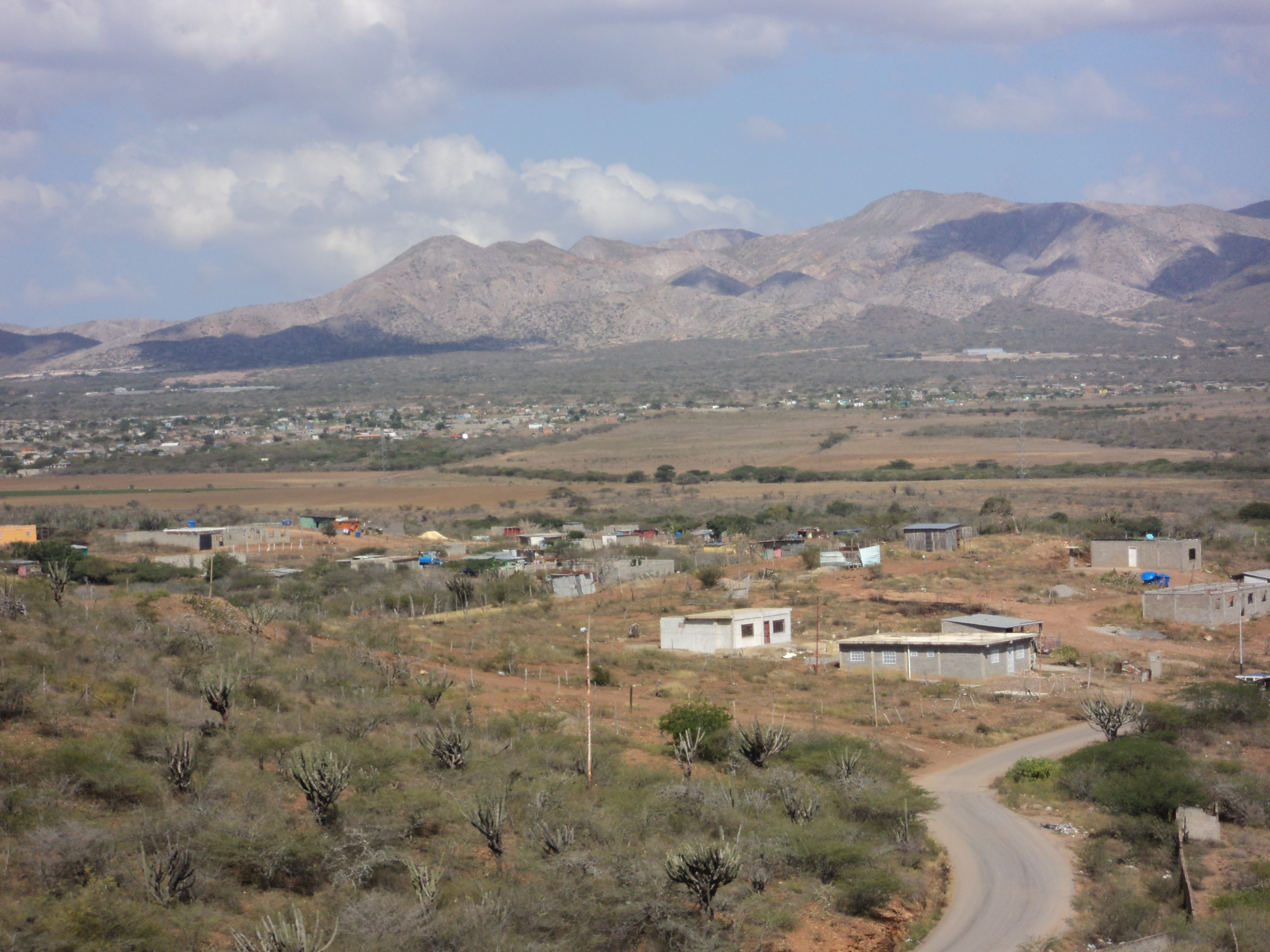
Plain to the west of Barquisimeto

The ecoregion is in the neotropical realm, in the deserts and xeric shrublands biome. The flora and fauna are adapted to extreme conditions of drought, salty soils, high winds and heat. Vegetation includes stunted scrub, low trees and cactuses. Herbaceous or bushy vegetation grows on the dunes and saline depressions by the coast. Further inland there is brush, scrub and areas of briars or cacti. These forms of vegetation may contain differing quantities of deciduous and evergreen trees depending on conditions, forming a complex mosaic of habitats.

=== Coastal grasslands ===
The coastal grasslands include halophyte plants in salty depressions and dune vegetation that grows along narrow strips of stabilized dunes on the peninsula between Coro and Adícora, and along the mainland coast on either side of Coro. Other areas of mobile dunes have little or no vegetation. Halophyte grasslands are typically low and open, without trees or bushes. Species include Atriplex pentandra, Heterostachya ritteriana, Salicornia fruticosa, Batis maritima and Sesuvium portulacastrum.

Grasslands on the sand dunes include dense but uneven herbaceous-bushy flora. Species include Scaevola plumieri, Portulaca pilosa, Cakile lanceolata, Cyperus planifolius, Sporobolus virginicus, Sporobolus piramydatus, Ipomoea pes-caprae, Euphorbia buxifolia, Spartina patens, Lycium bridgesii, Calotropis procera, Egletes prostrata, Argusia gnaphalodes, Tournefortia volubilis, Opuntia caracasana, Heterostachys ritteriana, Chamaesyce dioica, Chamaesyce mesembryanthemifolia, Croton punctatus, Cenchrus echinatus and Tribulus zeyheri. Isolated dunes may hold windblown trees and bushes such as Conocarpus erectus, Prosopis juliflora and Vachellia tortuosa.

=== Inland regions ===
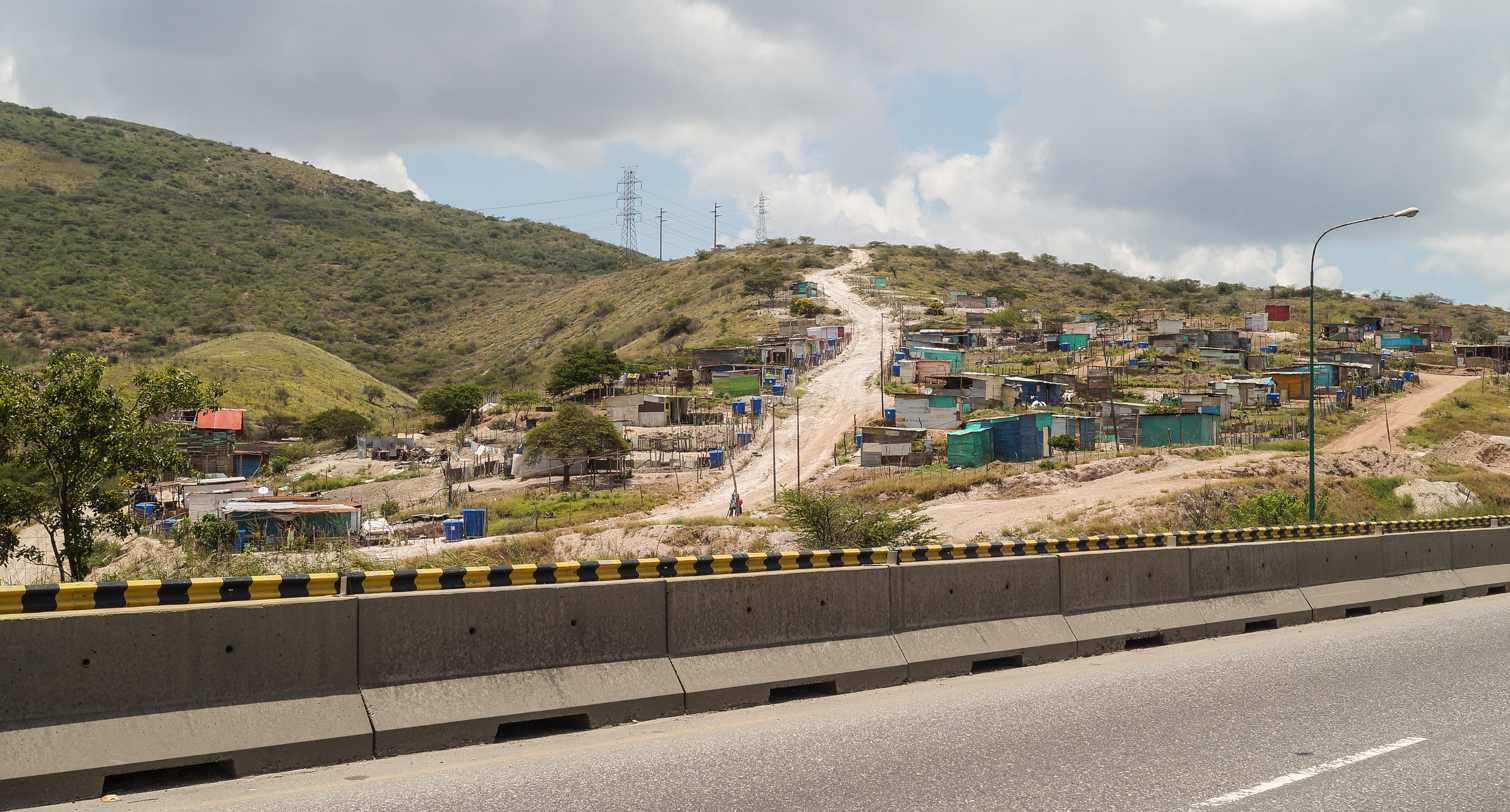
Shanty town on the outskirts of Barquisimeto

The bush lands are a transitional habitat between dry forests and briars. They contain trees under 5 metres (16 ft) high and bushy plants. The low and even storey is mainly composed of Opuntia caracasana, Lippia origanoides and Croton flavens. Many annual plants spring up in the rainy season. The most common species include Croton heliaster, Borreria cumanensis, Caesalpinia mollis, Randia gaumeri, Jacquinia aristata, Caesalpinia coriaria, Pithecellobium dulce, Capparis odoratissima, Capparis linearis, Caesalpinia coriaria, Pereskia guamacho, Prosopis juliflora, Stenocereus griseus, Malpighia species, Bursera tomentosa and Morisonia americana.

The scrub contains low bushy plants from 3–8 metres (9.8–26.2 ft) high, mostly very dense, and may be seen as degraded deciduous forests. Many of the species have thorns, spines, and prickles. Common species include Prosopis juliflora, Castela erecta, Stenocereus griseus, Opuntia caracasana, Croton crassifolius, Ipomoea carnea, and Parkinsonia praecox.

The driest parts of the arid and semi-arid areas hold dense or sparse vegetation of stunted thorny bushes and cacti. The areas where cacti columns are most common are called cardonales. Common bush species include Castela erecta, Prosopis juliflora, Parkinsonia praecox, Bourreria cumanensis, Pithecellobium dulce, Vachellia tortuosa, Acacia flexuosa, Stenocereus griseus, Opuntia caribea, Ipomoea carnea, Croton heliotropiifolius, Ipomoea carnea, Indigofera suffruticosa, Tephrosia senna, Aristida venezuelae, Calotropis procera and Capraria biflora. Common cacti include Acanthocereus tetragonus, Cereus hexagonus, Opuntia elatior and Pilosocereus lanuginosus.

=== Peninsula uplands ===
The vegetation of the peninsula includes thorny plants at elevations of 0–300 metres (0–984 ft), deciduous forests at 300–550 metres (980–1,800 ft), cloud forests at 550–700 metres (1,800–2,300 ft), scrubland with small bush-like trees at 700–800 metres (2,300–2,600 ft) and páramo-like vegetation with dwarf woody plants at 800–830 metres (2,620–2,720 ft) on the Cerro Santa Ana. The flora at the higher levels of the peninsula is very different from the rest of the ecoregion. The forests are dense, with two stories of low to medium trees and a thick understory. Common species include Protium tovarense, Tetrochidium rubrivenium, Hieronyma moritziana, Aichomea triplinervia, Qualea calophylla, Laplacea fruticosa, Graffenrieda latifolia, Clusia multiflora, Didymopanax glabratum, Ladenbergia moritziana, Vasconcellea microcarpa, Chamaedorea species, Geonoma species and Wettinia praemorsa. Endemic species include Geonoma paraguanensis, Philodendrum holtonianum and Rodospatha falconensis.

=== Rare or endemic flora ===
There are a few freshwater marshes, which hold endemic plant species and provide resting areas for resident and migratory birds. Plants species in the marshes include Acrostichium aurem, Marsilea ancylopoda, Nephrolepis hirsutula, Pitygramma trifoliata, Eichhornia crassipes, Amoreuxia wrightii, Ipomoea wrightiii, Pluchea odorata, Pluchea sagittalia and Eleocharis mutata. The Galapagos carpet weed (Sesuvium edmonstonei), formerly thought to be found only on the Galápagos Islands, has been observed on a protected strip of shore grasses and bush between Coro and La Vela. However, the description of the specimens is somewhat different from that of the Galapagos species, so it may be a different species. The rare Oxycarpha suaedifolia and Atriplex oestophora are mostly confined to the state of Falcón. Oxycarpha suaedifolia was first reported in 1917, growing in sand dune valleys near La Vela de Coro. Crossopetalum rhacoma (maidenberry), a rare bush 1–3 metres (3 ft 3 in – 9 ft 10 in) high, has only been recorded in the Morrocoy National Park in Paraguaná and the Lara-Falcón dry forests ecoregion.

=== Fauna ===
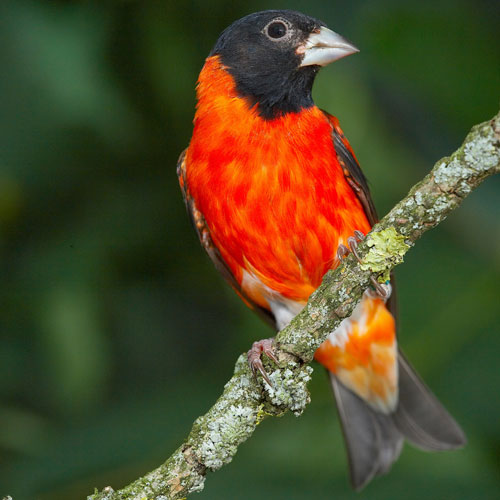
The endangered red siskin (Spinus cucullatus)

The endangered Guajira mouse opossum (Marmosa xerophila) has been recorded in some places in Falcón. The species is found only in dry areas in Colombia and Venezuela around the mouth of Lake Maracaibo, mostly tropical thorn or very dry forest with mean temperatures above 24 °C (75 °F) and rainfall from 250–500 millimetres (9.8–19.7 in). Much of its habitat has been converted to agriculture, and the remnants are very fragmented. The main breeding period in the Paraguaná Peninsula is the dry season in June and July. It may occur in the Cerro Santa Ana Natural Monument but has not been recorded there.

Other vulnerable species found in the more wooded areas are ocelot (Leopardus pardalis), cougar (Puma concolor) and jaguar (Panthera onca). A poison-arrow frog species, Mannophryne lamarcai, was discovered in a small area of Socopó Ridge in Falcón at 520 metres (1,710 ft). The frog, considered critically endangered, was found in 2004 in a small marsh beside a dirt road and in calm sections of a small stream. The surrounding area was cloud forest that had been cleared to create cattle pasture.

The endangered red siskin (Spinus cucullatus) is found in the ecoregion in the Lara–Falcón valleys. Although protected by law, as of 2016 the population of the species was declining quickly due to trapping for sale as a cage bird, and the population was severely fragmented. It is observed at elevations from 100–1,500 metres (330–4,920 ft), moving seasonally and daily from moist evergreen forest to dry deciduous woodlands, and the surrounding shrubby grasslands and pastures. The yellow-shouldered amazon (Amazona barbadensis) is almost extinct in Paraguaná due to destruction of its arid habitat in Falcón. Other endangered birds include the plain-flanked rail (Rallus wetmorei).

== Status ==
The World Wildlife Fund gives the ecoregion the status of "Critical/Endangered". Protected areas in or near to the ecoregion include the 9,128 hectares (22,560 acres) Médanos de Coro National Park, the 1,900 hectares (4,700 acres) Cerro Santa Ana Natural Monument and the 7,275 hectares (17,980 acres) León Hill Natural Monument. The Médanos de Coro National Park theoretically protects a sizeable part of the ecoregion, but in practice has often been invaded by individuals and government agencies. There is a municipal dump in the park, privately owned facilities for extracting salt and outlets for untreated waste water.

Unplanned housing and tourist facilities have invaded many areas and large areas of scrubland have been destroyed, causing the dunes to move and become barren of all vegetation. Attempts have been made to open a tourist complex in the area, destroying large areas of typical vegetation. Marshes have been drained for housing development. Most of the trees have been cut down, often surreptitiously by poor residents, leaving only a few remnants of forest. The wood is used for small buildings, furniture, fencing and fuel. Extensive grazing of livestock such as goats threaten the habitat. Large areas of scrub have been cleared and replaced by vegetable farms. Small mammals are poached. Other threats come from dam construction, oil exploitation, mining and road building.

== Sources ==
- Alarcón, Clara, Northern South America: Northernwestern [sic] Venezuela, WWF: World Wildlife Fund
- Bird, Eric (25 February 2010), Encyclopedia of the World's Coastal Landforms, Springer Science & Business Media, ISBN 978-1-4020-8638-0
- BirdLife International (2016), "Spinus cucullatus", The IUCN Red List of Threatened Species 2016: e.T22720374A94666946, doi:10.2305/IUCN.UK.2016-3.RLTS.T22720374A94666946.en
- Mennessier, F. Audemard (1996), "Late quaternary marine deposits of the Paraguana Peninsula, state of falcon, northwestern Venezuela: Preliminary geological observations and neotectonic implications", Quaternary International, 31: 5–11, doi:10.1016/1040-6182(95)00016-C
- Mijares, Abraham; La Marca, Enrique; Manzanill, Jesús a (2004), "Mannophryne lamarcai", The IUCN Red List of Threatened Species 2004: e.T55245A11280015., doi:10.2305/IUCN.UK.2004.RLTS.T55245A11280015.en
- "Oxycarpha suaedifolia S. F. Blake", Harvard University Herbaria & Libraries, Harvard University
- "Paraguana xeric scrub", Global Species, Myers Enterprises II
- Pérez-Hernandez, R.; López Fuster, M.; Ventura, J. (2016), "Marmosa xerophila", The IUCN Red List of Threatened Species 2016: e.T12815A22174448, doi:10.2305/IUCN.UK.2016-3.RLTS.T12815A22174448.en
- Tye, A.; Kling, M. (2014), "Sesuvium edmondstonii", The IUCN Red List of Threatened Species 2014: e.T39070A61481431, doi:10.2305/IUCN.UK.2014-3.RLTS.T39070A61481431.en
- WildFinder, WWF: World Wildlife Fund
