= Coro region =

Sistema Coriano Lara-Falcón Formation Lara-Falcón System
- Geographic/Natural Region
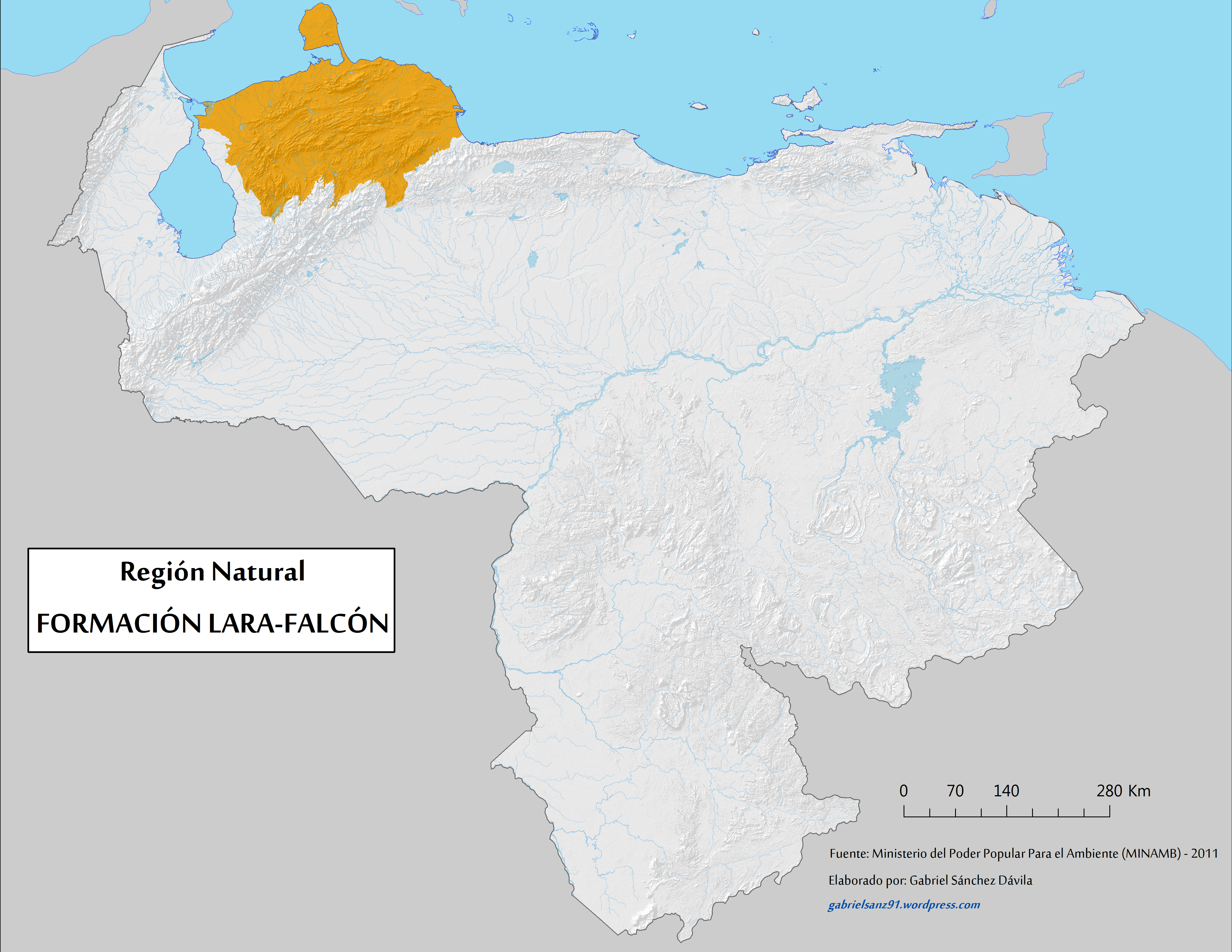
- Geographic map of the Sistema Coriano natural region.
- Coordinates: 10°N 69°W
- Country: Venezuela
- State: Falcón, Lara State, Yaracuy State, Zulia State and Carabobo State

Area
  - Total: 52,695 km^{2} (20,346 sq mi)

The Sistema Coriano also known as Lara-Falcón Formation, Coro region or Coriano system is one of the eight natural regions of Venezuela. Is the hilly and semi-mountainous area in northwest Venezuela, north of the Mérida Andes and east of the Maracaibo Basin, extending north to the Caribbean coast. It consists mostly of east–west running ridges, with the exception of the Sierra de Siruma or Empalado which run north–south.

== Ecology ==
The region contains the Paraguana xeric scrub ecoregion. The coastal plain contains Venezuela's only desert, the Médanos de Coro (the Coro Dunes), on the Paraguaná Peninsula. The Coro region is one of the ten geographical regions into which Venezuela can be divided. Because the two major depression valleys are the Falcón and the Lara, the mountains are sometimes called the Falcón-Lara ranges. The geographic region covers all of Falcón State, half of Lara State and Yaracuy State, and small percentages of Zulia State and Carabobo State. It's the 3rd largest natural region in the country, covering 5.75% of Venezuela.

== Hydrology ==
Coro region is very dry, with the evaporation rate frequently exceeding the precipitation rate at the lower elevations. There are three major river systems in the region. The Pedregal and Paraíso rivers which feed into the Mitare River which empties into the Coro Gulf. The Morere, Barigua and Bucares rivers which together form the Tocuyo River, arguably the most important river in the area draining 223.44 square kilometres, and emptying into the Caribbean near the Triste Gulf. The Tocuyo river crosses the ecoregion called the Lara Falcón Dry Forest. In the valleys of the Lara-Falcón depression, the Turbio river is the most important due to its volume of water; its mouth is near the Orinoco River basin.

== Geology ==
With the exception of the Siquisique highlands (which are an igneous remnant of Jurassic age), the rocks are Cenozoic, mostly 30 to 70 m.y.o., (Paleocene, Eocene, Oligocene), overlaid by some Pleistocene and Holocene alluvial deposits. This corresponds well with the Andean orogeny.

== Economy ==
There are some oil deposits, but mainly the population relies on subsistence farming with some cattle grazing. The dry climate is not conducive to commercial agriculture, but there are some aloe vera plantations. There is some mining in the higher mountains and fishing on the coast.

== Towns ==
- Barquisimeto
- Cabudare
- Carora
- Coro
- Dabajuro
- Punto Fijo
- Riecito
- El Tocuyo
