= Mitare River =

- Mouth location in Venezuela
- Native name: Río Mitare (Spanish)

Location
- Country: Venezuela

Physical characteristics
- Mouth
  - coordinates: 11°24′17″N 69°58′08″W

The Mitare River (Spanish: Río Mitare) is a river in northwestern Venezuela.

The Mitare River flows through the Paraguana xeric scrub ecoregion. In its delta it divides into the Pedregal and Paraíso rivers, which empty into the gulf of Coro on the Caribbean. The delta of the Mitare, which is an intermittent stream, was changed in nature when the seaway of the La Vela gulf was closed. Formerly the delta was highly destructive, but after the closure it became highly constructive.

== See also ==
- List of rivers of Venezuela

== Sources ==
- Alarcón, Clara, Northern South America: Northernwestern [sic] Venezuela, WWF: World Wildlife Fund
- Rabasso, Jose (July 1974), "El Delta del Rio Mitare Noroeste de Venezuela" (PDF), Boletin Informativo, 17 (7-8-9), Asociación Venezolana de Geología, Minería y Petróleo (AVGMP)
