= Serranía del Empalado =

The Serranía del Empalado, also referred as serranía de Siruma or Ciruma, forms part of the system Coriano or Lara-Falcón-Yaracuy formation in Venezuela. It is a mountainous chain relatively high, small and isolated. It is separated of the Serranía of Jirajara, south, by lower heights to the 900m; of the Sierra of Baragua, to the east, by the Depression of Carora; and of the Sierra of Saint Luis by the valley of the river Matícora.

Location of the Serranía of the Empalado and the Hill Socopo in the border between the states Zulia, Falcón and Lara, in Venezuela.

It is conformed by two macizos joined by relatively high valleys. The Socopó, or Socopo hill, has an area of 38,4 km^{2} above the height of 900 m and a maximum height of 1571 m. The macizo conformed by Cerro Azúl and the Cerrón, has an area of 508,3 km^{2} and a maximum height of 1900 m.

It is considered the natural oriental limit of the basin of the Lake of Maracaibo, and from the 19th century has served to delineate the administrative limit of the provinces of Coro, Maracaibo and Barquisimeto. It is currently located at the border of the Venezuelan states Falcón, Lara and Zulia. It is also considered the north-western limit of the extinct jirajaranas language.

== Vegetation ==
The original vegetation is predominantly dry forest, although there are remainders of cloud forest.

It is home to emblematic trees like Gyranthera caribensis and palms Attalea butyracea (Mutis ex L.f.) Wess.Boer. or Geonoma interrupta (Ruiz & Pav.) Mart.

== Fauna ==
40 species of mammals (excluding bats) have been recorded in the lower west side of the Serranía del Empalado in the Burro Negro Protected Watershed of the Pueblo Viejo dam, and a similar number from the northern slopes of the range.

At least three species of frogs are consider endemic of this Serranía: Dendropsophus amicorum, Mannophryne lamarcai and Leptodactylus magistris. Other, widespread species of frogs are also found, such as Hyla crepitans, Bufo marinus, Phyllomedusa trinitatis, Phrynohyas venulosa and Physalaemus pustulosus.
