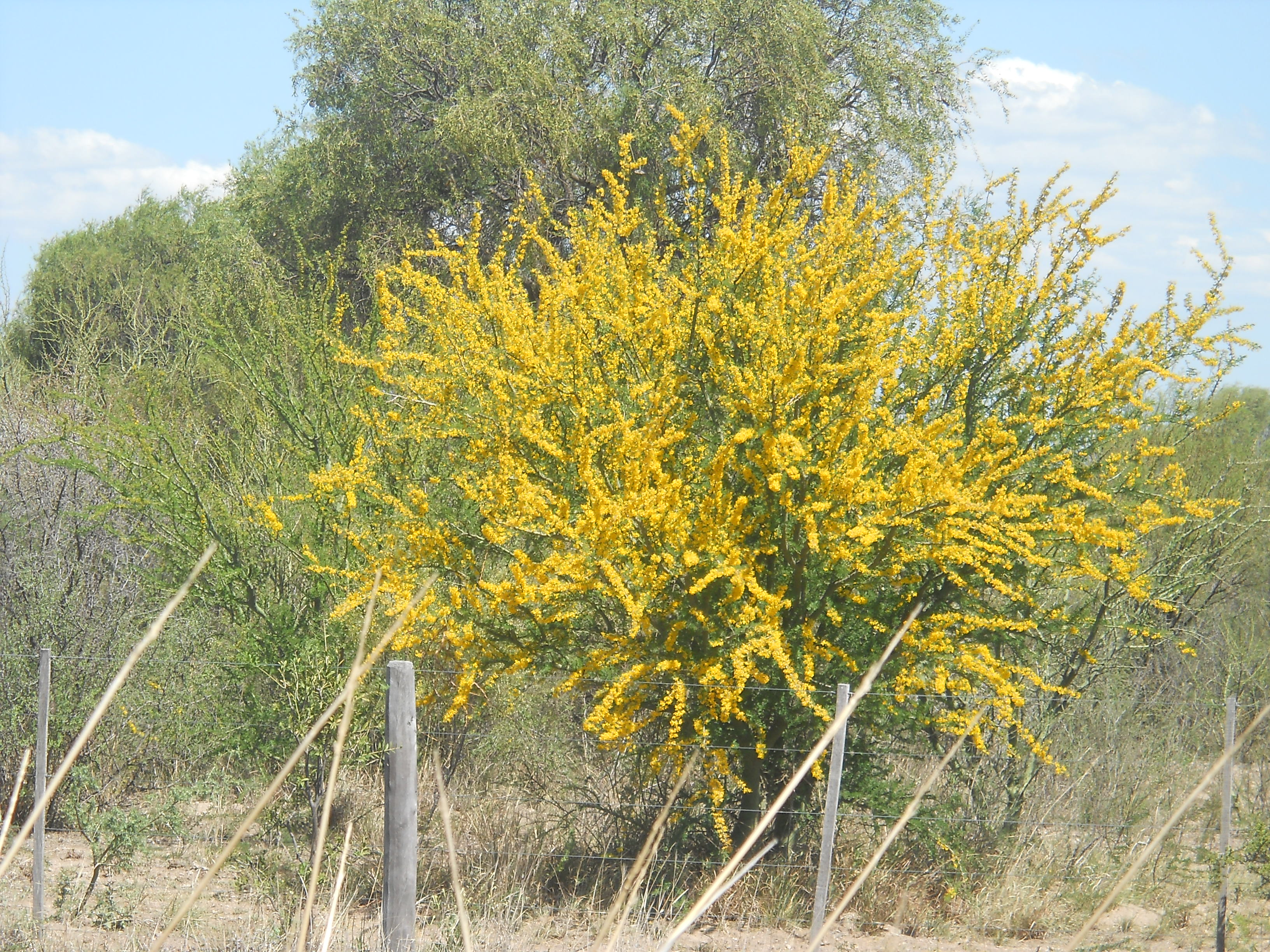
- In bloom
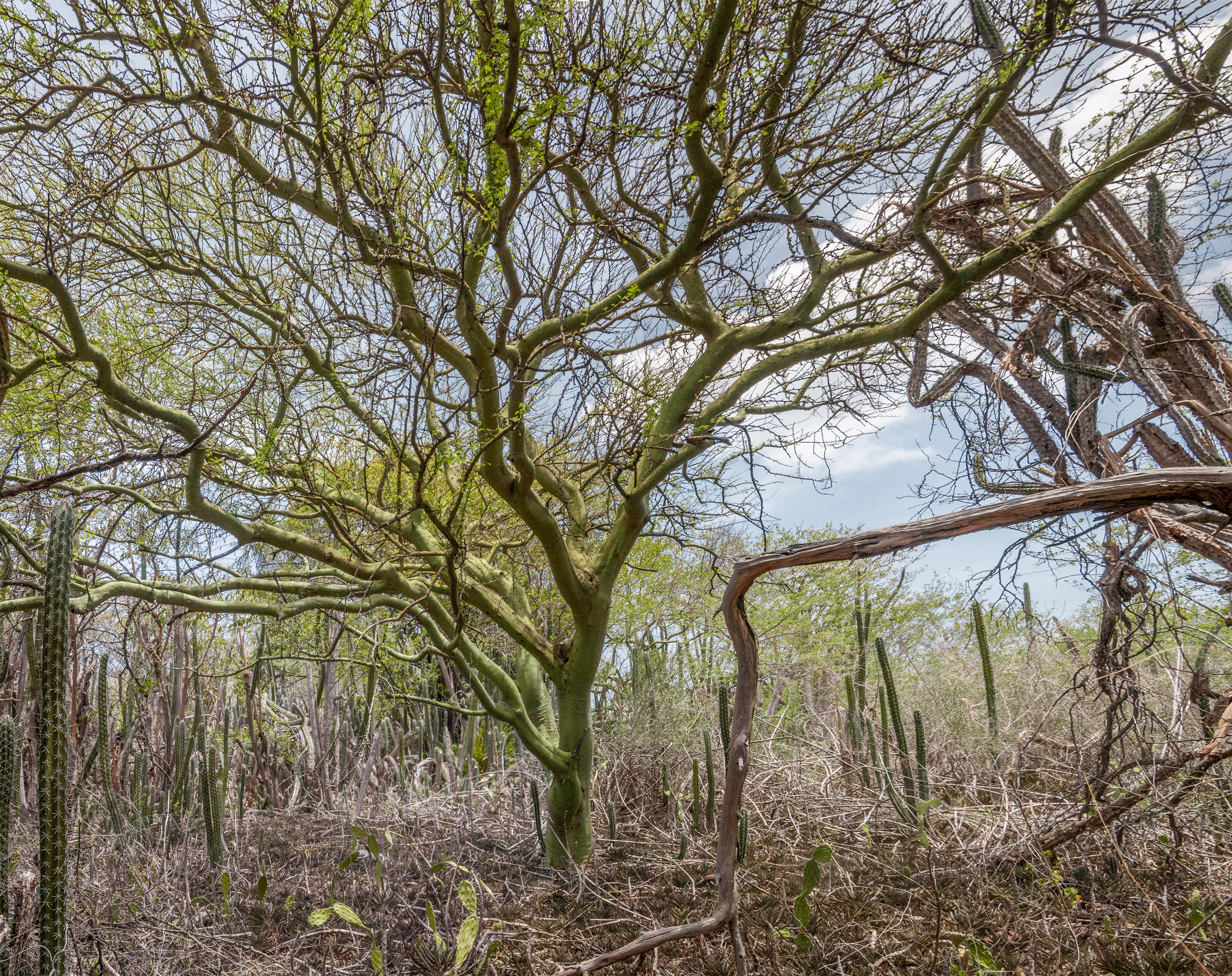
- Branching structure

Conservation status
- Least Concern (IUCN 3.1)

Scientific classification
- Kingdom: Plantae
- Clade: Tracheophytes
- Clade: Angiosperms
- Clade: Eudicots
- Clade: Rosids
- Order: Fabales
- Family: Fabaceae
- Subfamily: Caesalpinioideae
- Genus: Parkinsonia
- Species: P. praecox

Binomial name
- Parkinsonia praecox (Ruiz & Pav.) Hawkins

Synonyms
- List: Caesalpinia brea Gillies ex Steud.; Caesalpinia praecox Ruiz & Pav.; Cercidium goldmanii Rose; Cercidium plurifoliolatum Micheli; Cercidium praecox (Ruiz & Pav.) Harms; Cercidium spinosum Tul.; Cercidium unijugum Rose; Cercidium viride (H.Karst.) H.Karst.; Rhetinophloeum viride H.Karst.

= Parkinsonia praecox =

Species of plant

Parkinsonia praecox (syn. Cercidium praecox), the palo brea or Sonoran palo verde, is a species of flowering plant in the family Fabaceae. It is native to the dry Neotropics from Mexico to Argentina. A small tree reaching 6 to 9 m (20 to 30 ft), it is usually a bit wider than it is tall.

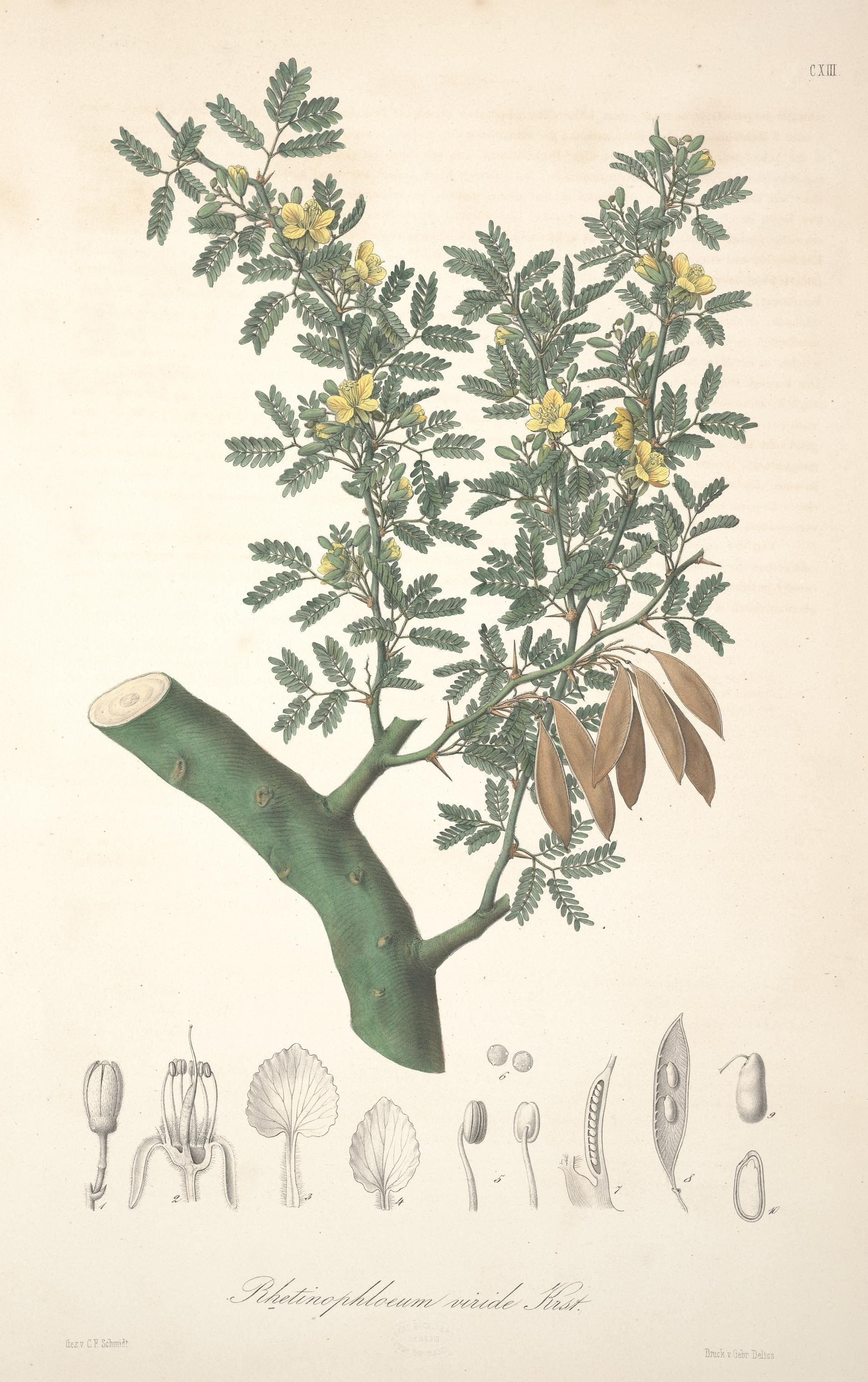
P. praecox illustrated in Florae Columbiae.

== Cultivation ==
Parkinsonia praecox is valued as a xeriscaping ornamental for its yellow wands of early-blooming flowers, its chartreuse-to-green bark, and its graceful branching habit. A drought-adapted species, it drops its leaves in the dry season. Overwatering will cause it to grow rapidly with weak wood, and then it is likely to collapse.

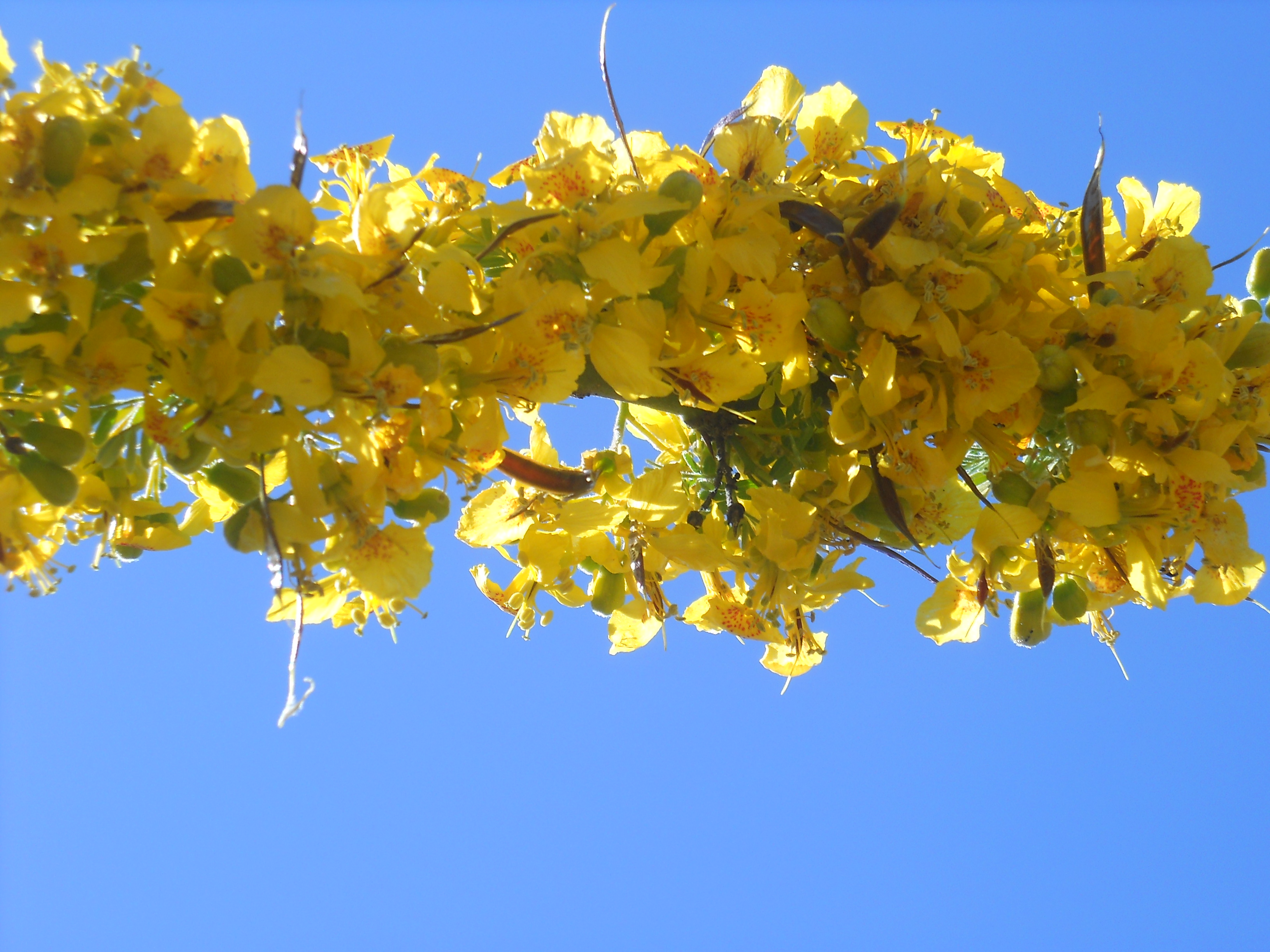
A flowering branch

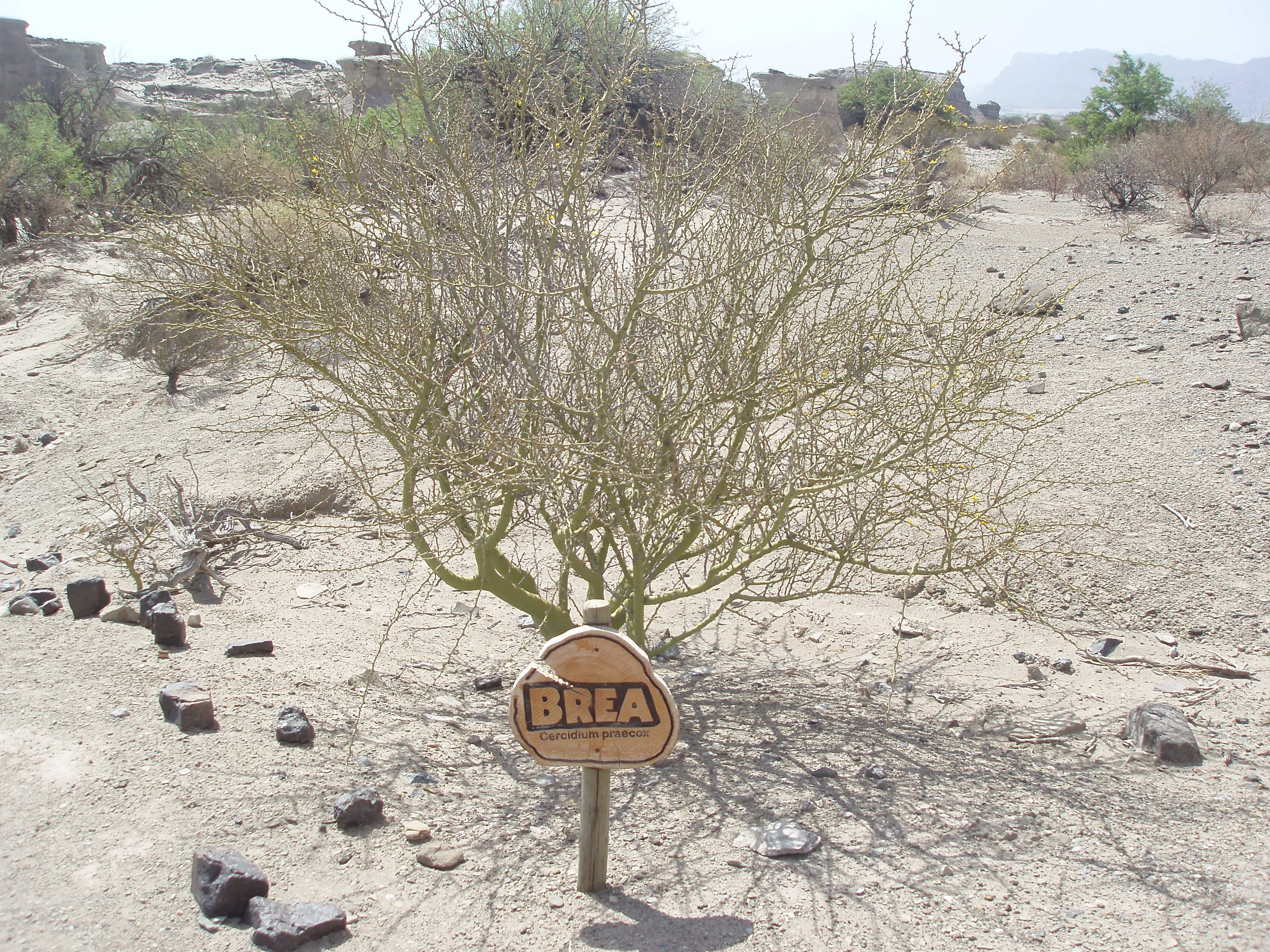
Leafless

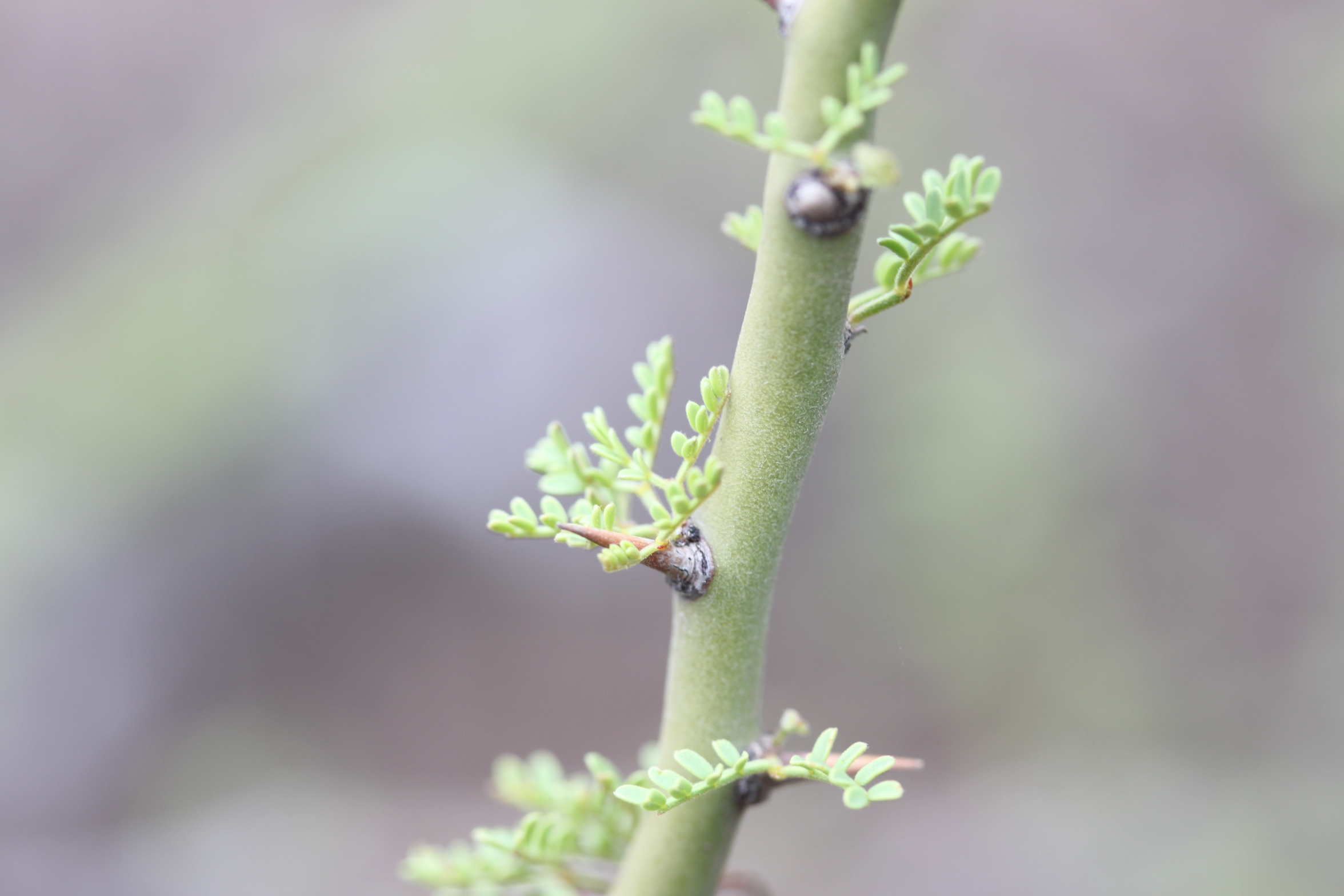
Close up of leaves and spines

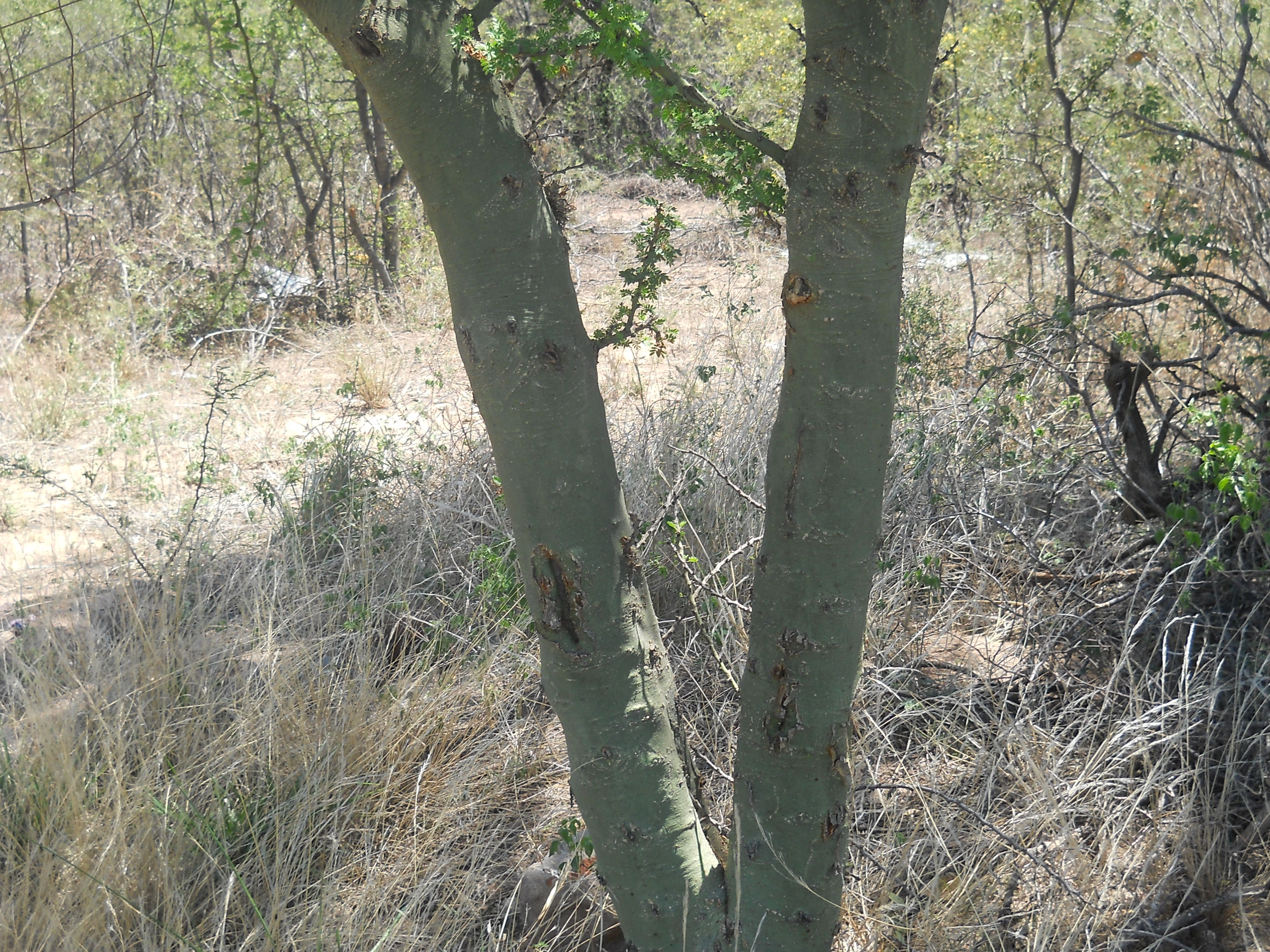
Trunks of a large individual

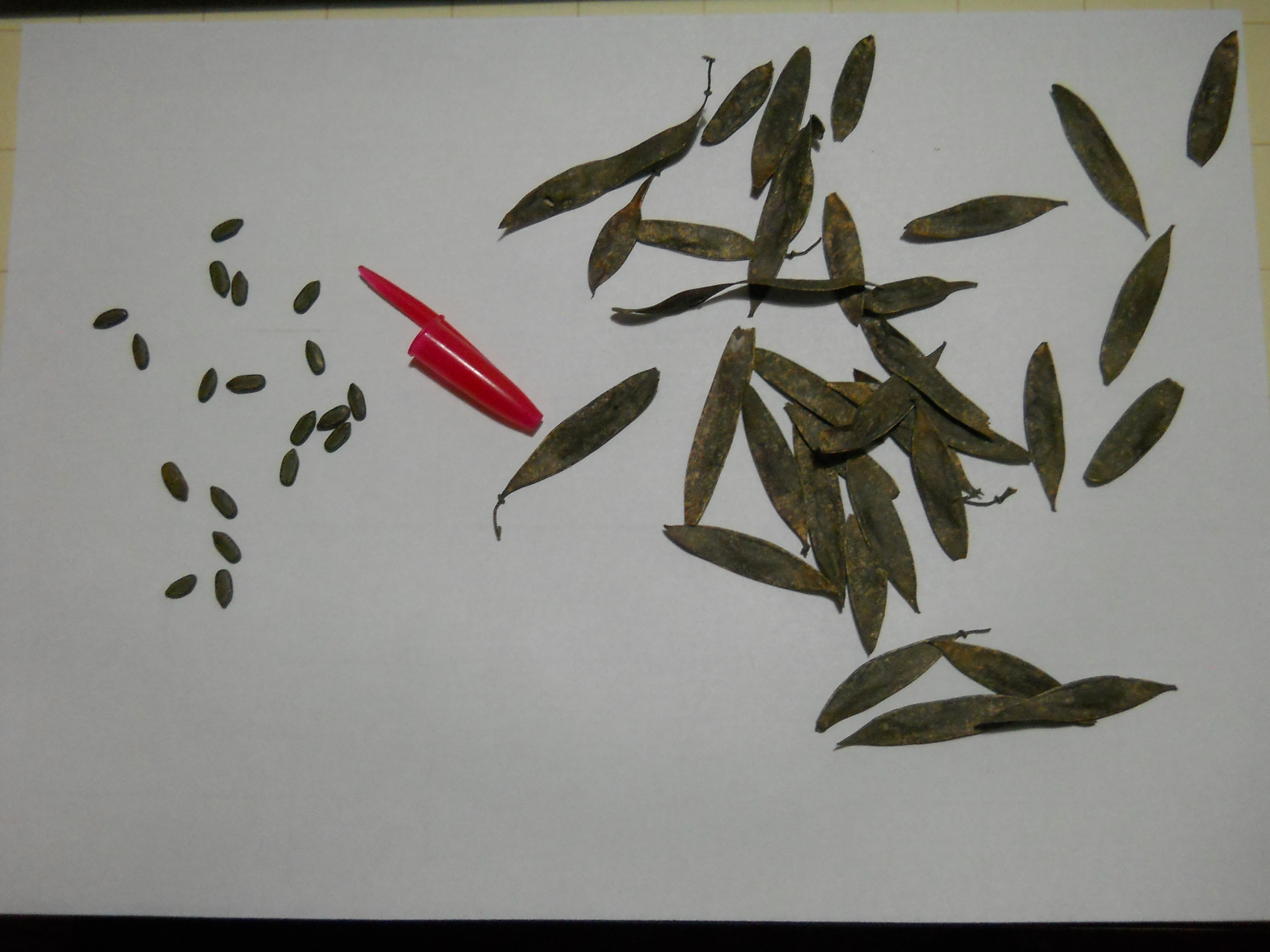
Pods and seeds
