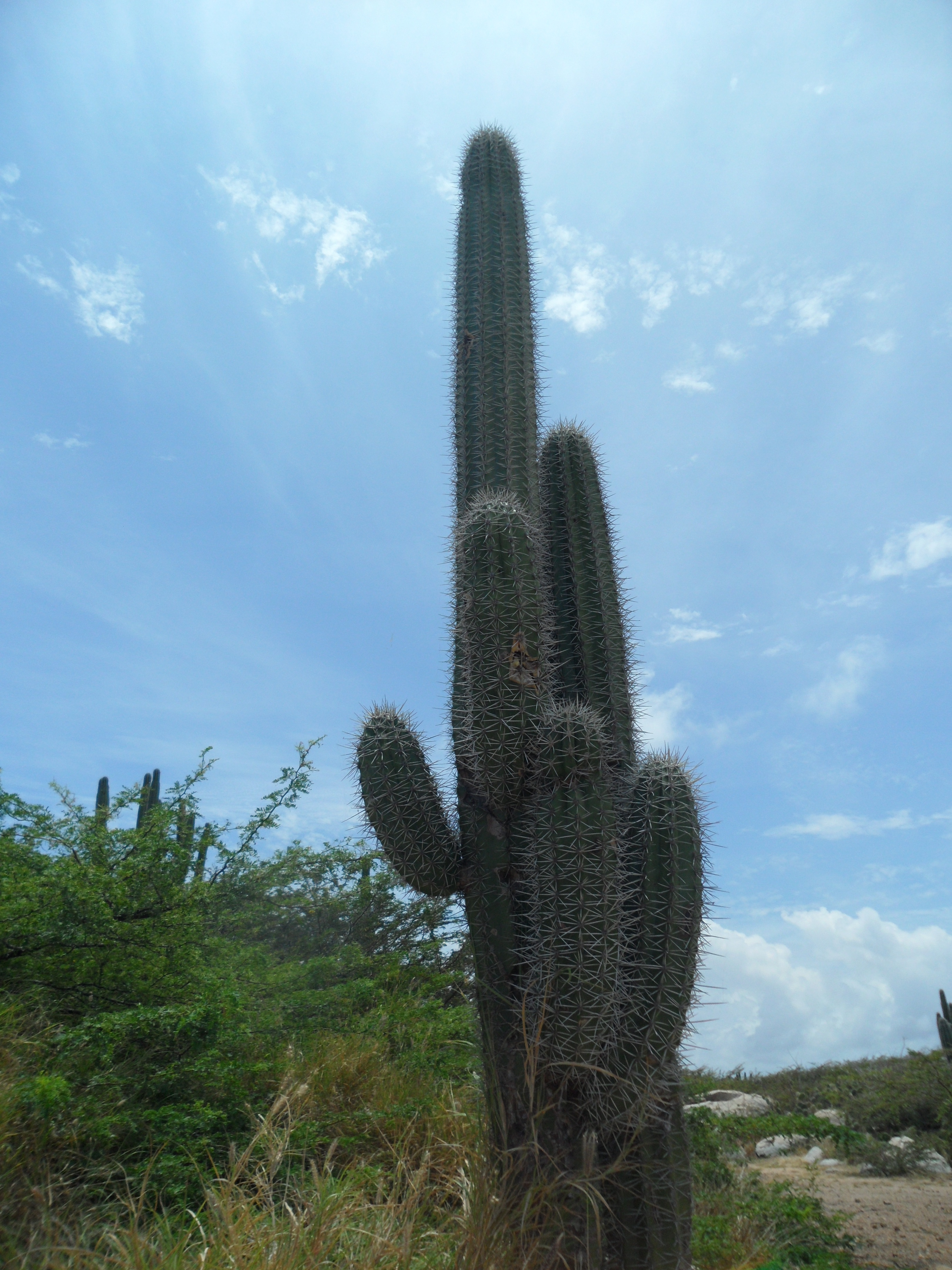
- S. griseus in Arashi Bay Coast Noord, Aruba

Conservation status
- Least Concern (IUCN 3.1)

Scientific classification
- Kingdom: Plantae
- Clade: Tracheophytes
- Clade: Angiosperms
- Clade: Eudicots
- Order: Caryophyllales
- Family: Cactaceae
- Subfamily: Cactoideae
- Genus: Stenocereus
- Species: S. griseus

Binomial name
- Stenocereus griseus (Haw.) Buxb.

Synonyms
- Stenocereus eburneus; Lemaireocereus eburneus; Ritterocereus deficiens; Lemaireocereus deficiens; Cereus deficiens; Stenocereus victoriensis; Neolemaireocereus griseus; Ritterocereus griseus; Cereus griseus; Lemaireocereus griseus; Cereus eburneus

= Stenocereus griseus =

Species of cactus

Stenocereus griseus, also known as the Mexican organ pipe, dagger cactus, pitaya, and pitayo de mayo, is a species of cactus.

== Description ==
Stenocereus griseus is a tree-shaped cactus that grows to 6-9 meters tall with a clear trunk and upright green stems, about 9-12 centimeters in diameter, with six to ten ribs below the areoles. It bears one to three central spines up to 1.5 centimeters long, the longest of which reaches 4 centimeters, and six to eleven marginal spines measuring 6-10 millimeters long.

This species produces white, funnel-shaped flowers that bloom at night and last until midday, with bent-back flower bracts. The flowers are about 10 centimeters long. Its spherical to elongated fruits are white, yellowish green, to red or dark purple, up to 5 centimeters in diameter, and covered with thorns that shed when ripe. The flesh is red.

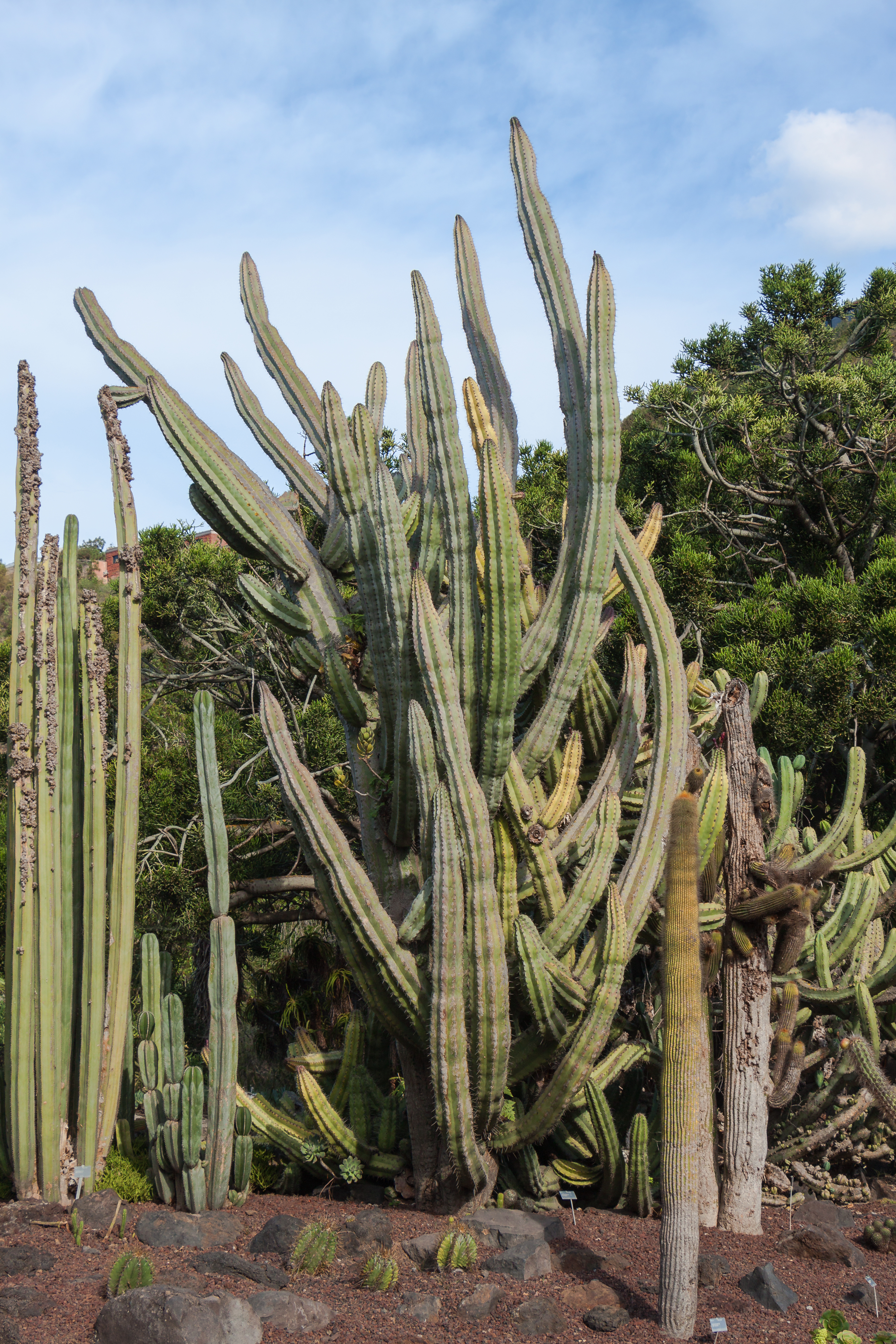
Habit

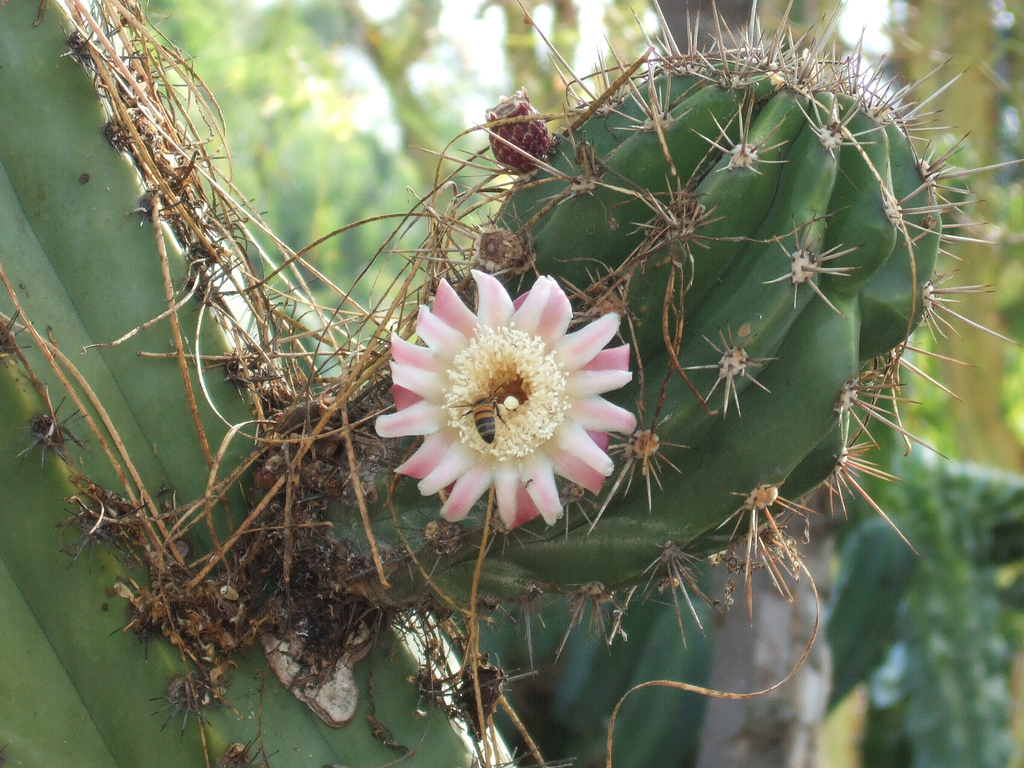
Flower

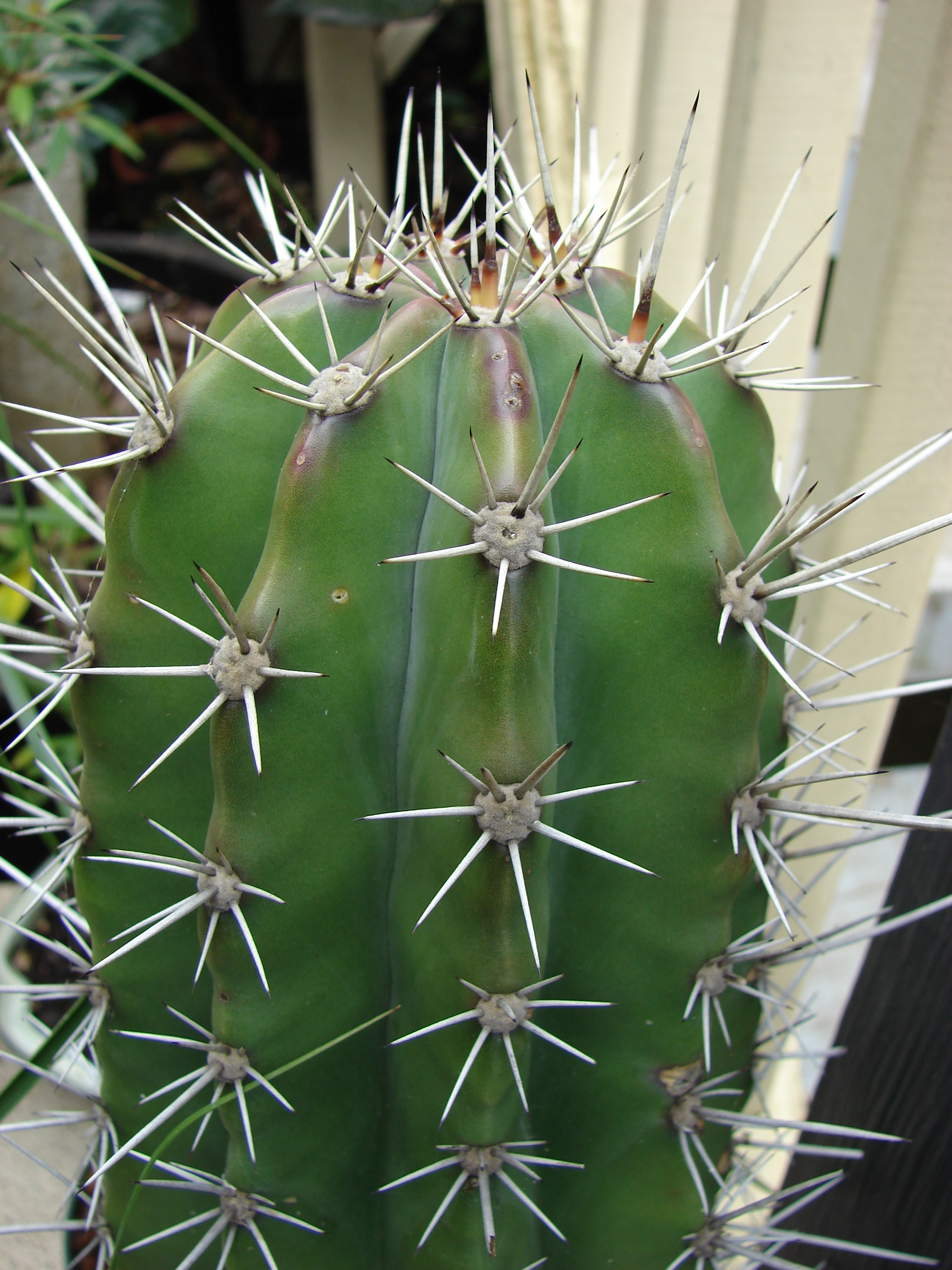
Branch

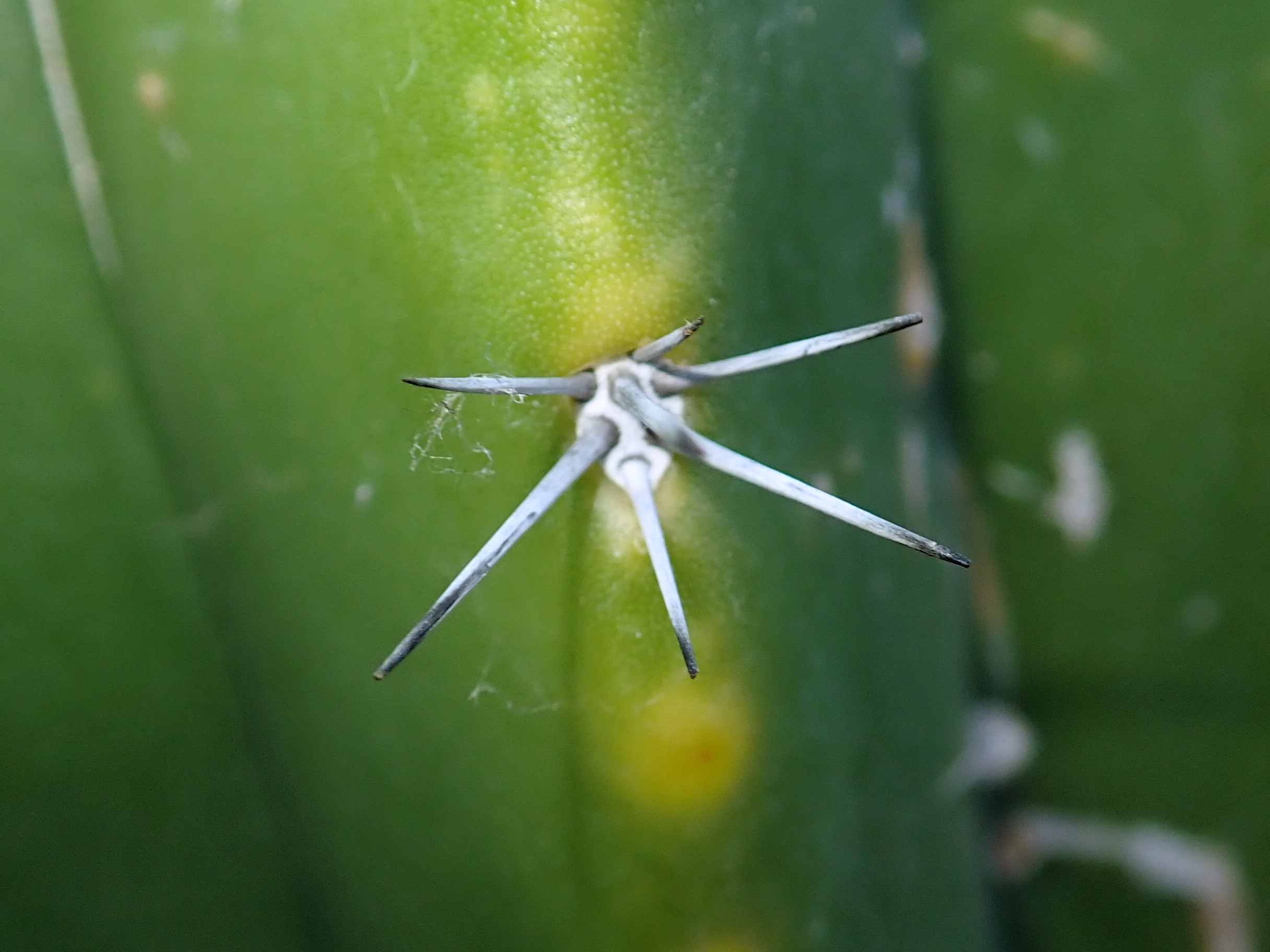
spine

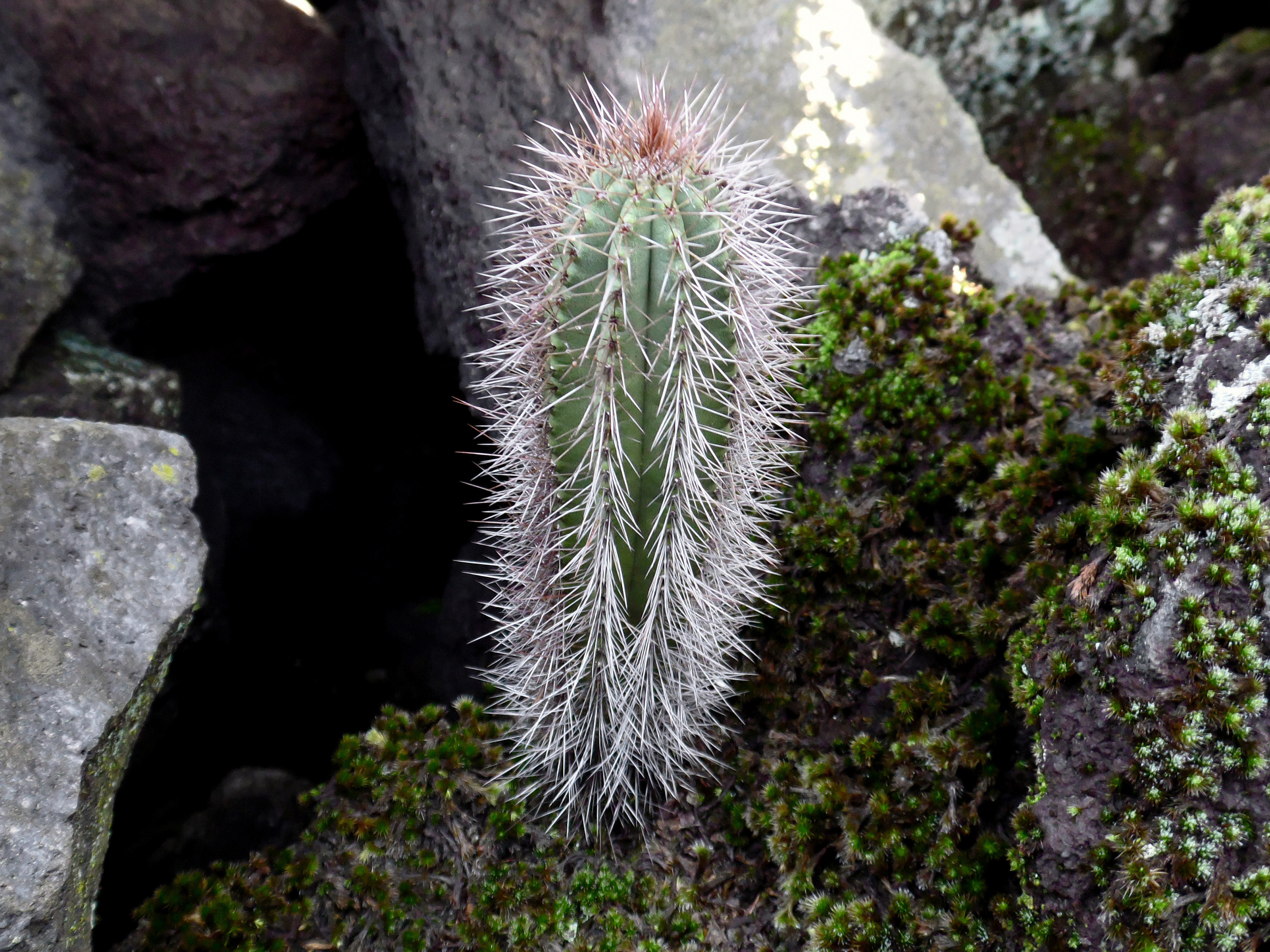
seedling

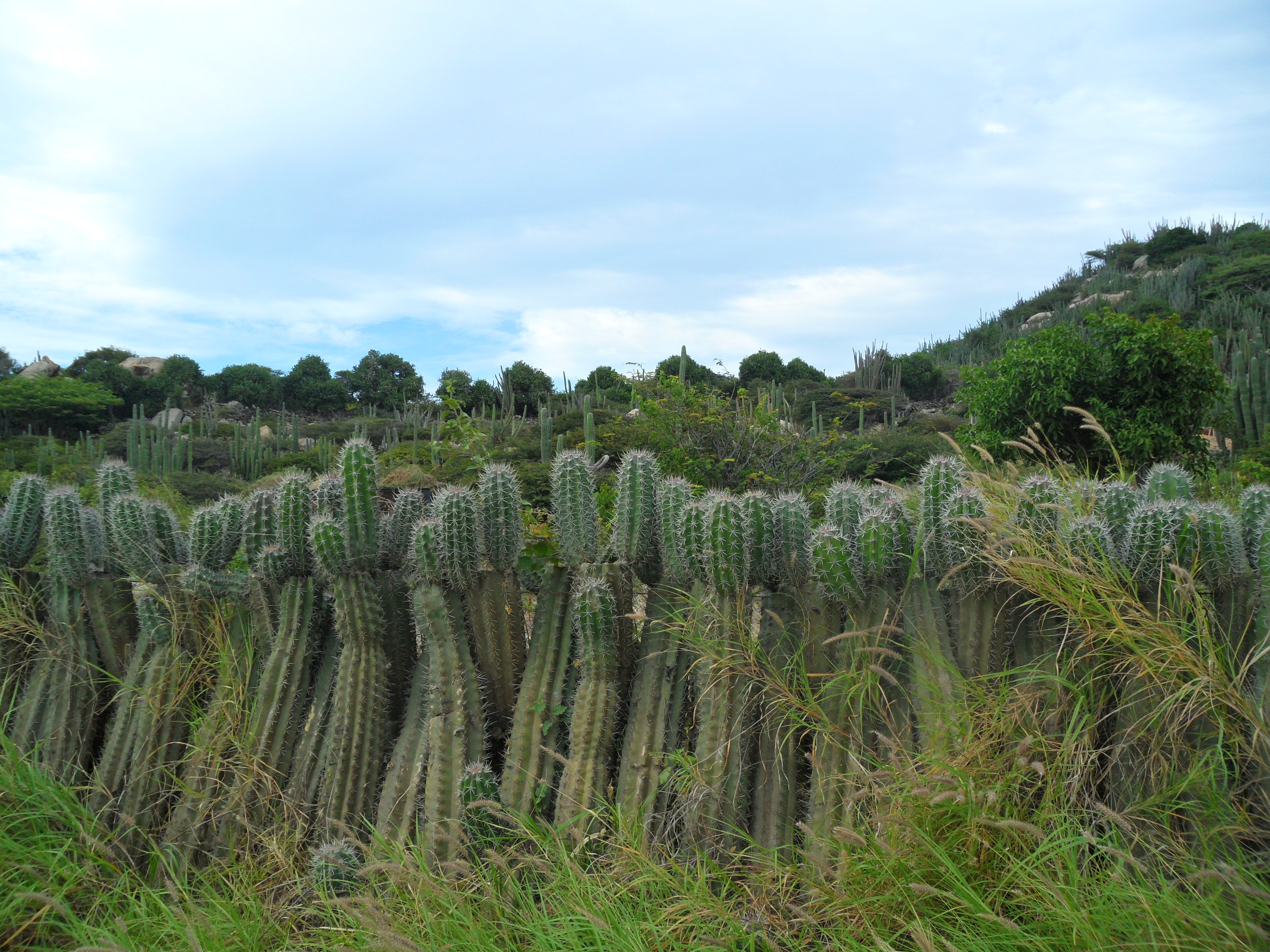
Stenocereus griseus fence in Santa Cruz Aruba

== Distribution ==
This species is found in Mexico in Oaxaca and Veracruz, coastal Venezuela, Guajira Peninsula of Colombia and the ABC islands of the Dutch Caribbean. It is found in scrub-lands. Observations of this species have also been reported in the dry scrub-lands at the base of the Eastern Cordillera of the Colombian Andes. However it has not been collected in this region. In the Caribbean islands of Aruba, Curaçao and Bonaire, this cactus blooms and fruits profusely during the dry season. It is a critical resource for bats, birds and other animals.

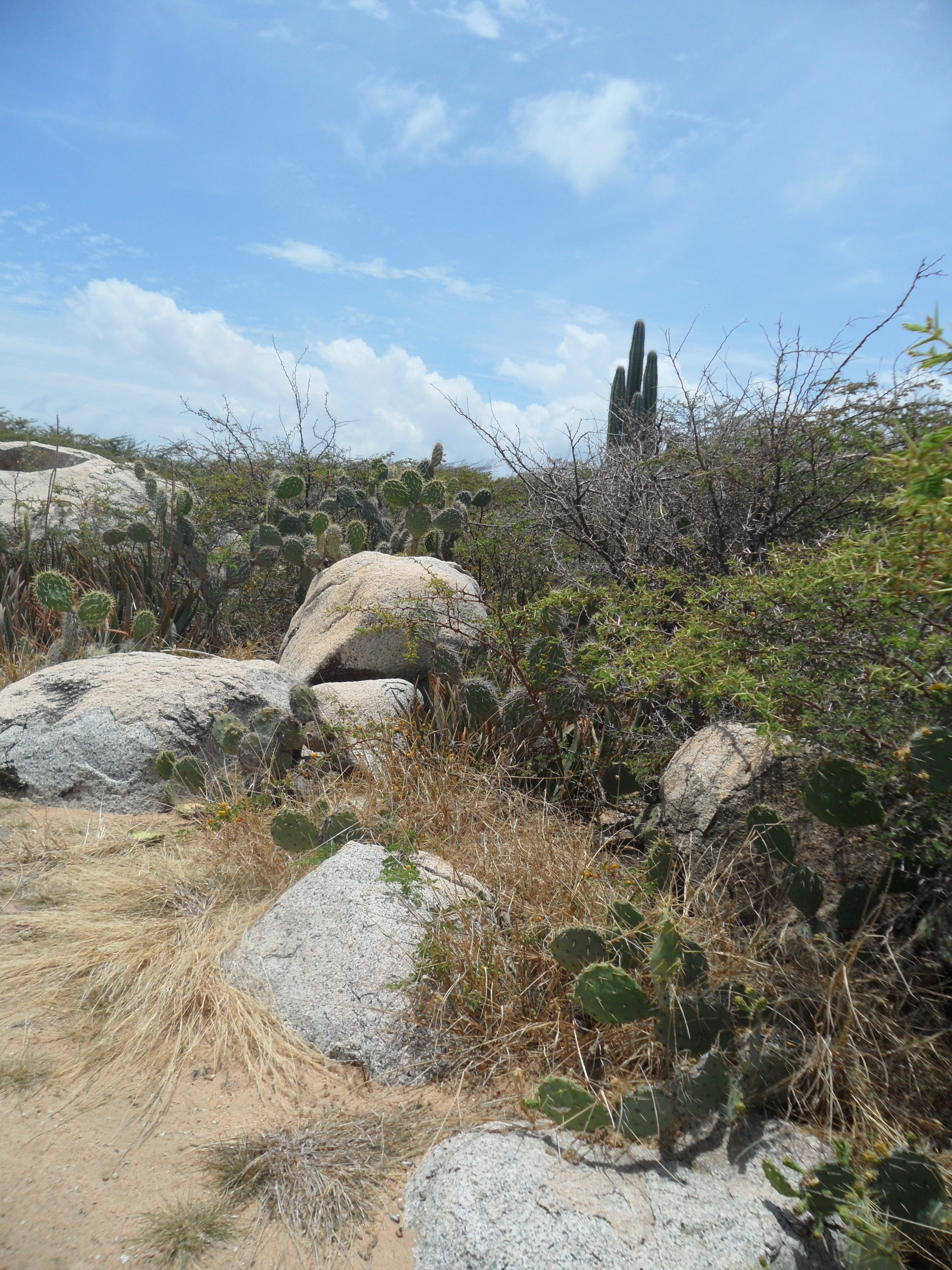
Stenocereus griseus habitat in Arashi Bay Coast, Noord Aruba

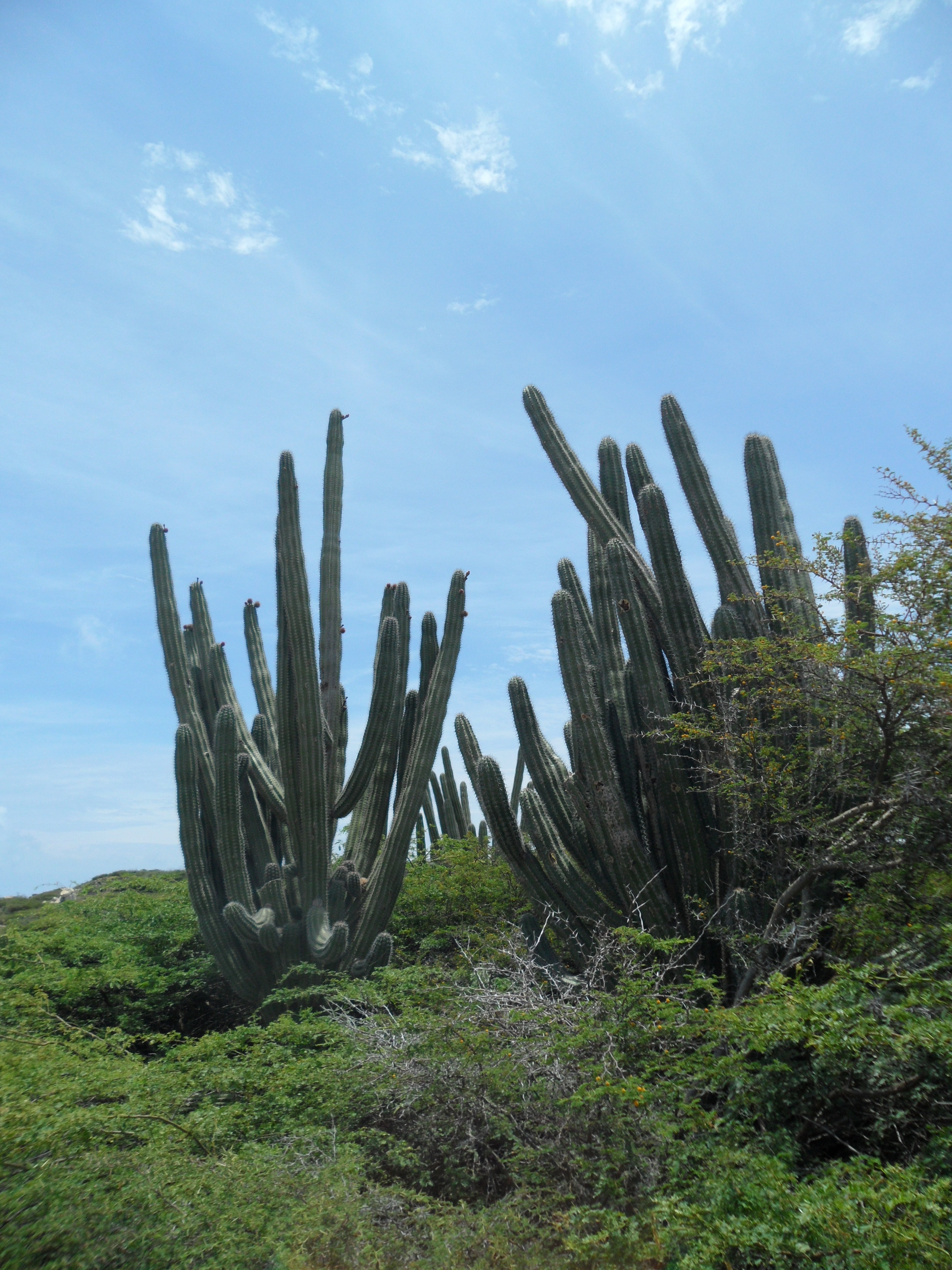
Stenocereus Griseus growing in habitat in Noord Aruba

== Human uses ==
Its fruit is edible to humans and is considered good tasting. It is planted as an ornamental and as a living fence in warm regions. When used as a fence, it can be impervious to animals due to its spiny nature.

== Taxonomy ==
First described as Cereus griseus in 1812 by Adrian Hardy Haworth, the species was later placed in the genus Stenocereus by Franz Buxbaum in 1961. The specific epithet "griseus" derives from Latin, meaning 'gray,' in reference to the thorns of the species. The species is found in CITES Appendix II as a species of Least Concern. Its population is considered stable.
