= Cerro Santa Ana Natural Monument =

Mountain in Paraguaná, Venezuela

Cerro Santa Ana Natural Monument Monumento Natural Cerro Santa Ana
- IUCN category III (natural monument or feature)
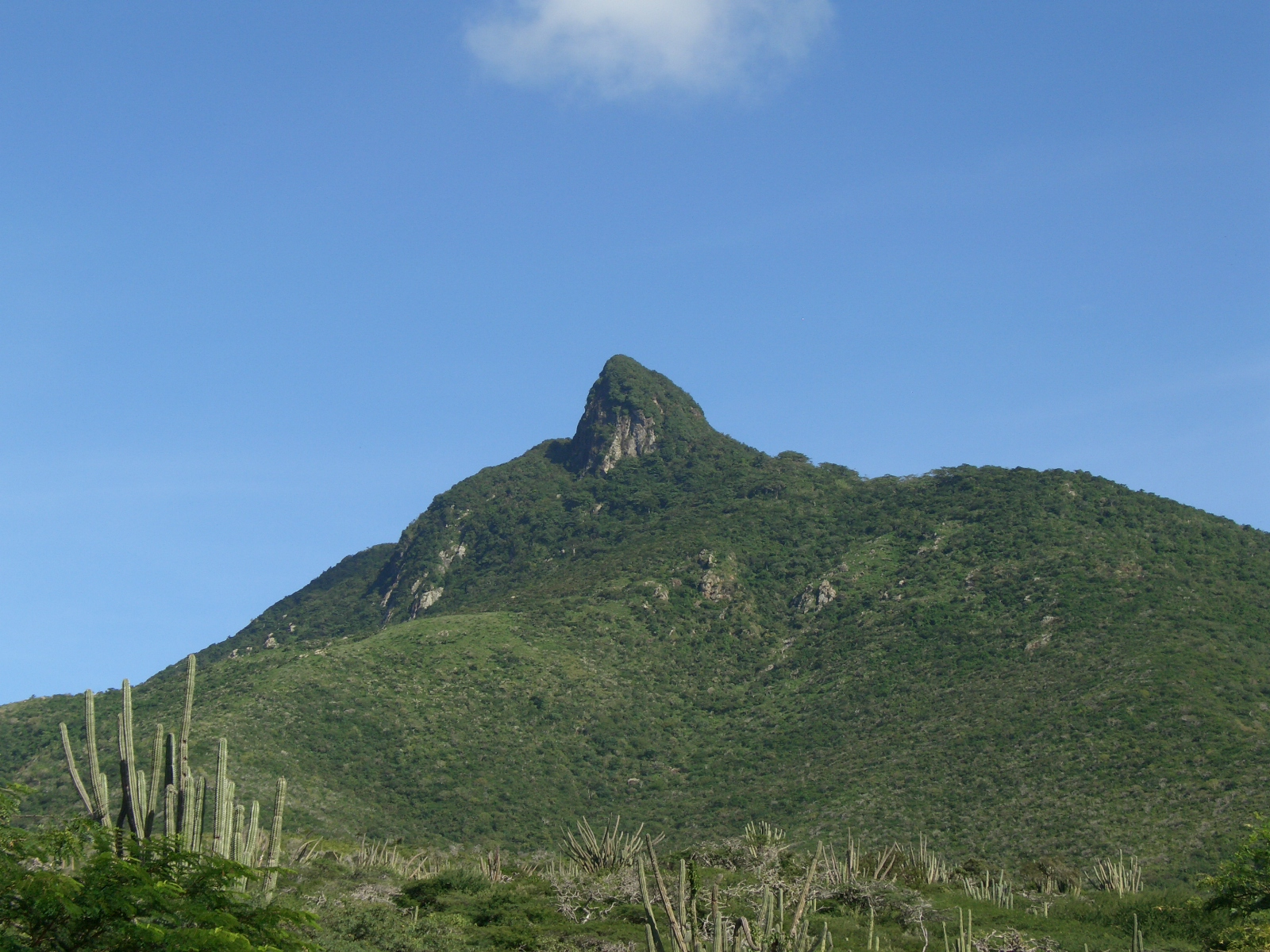

- Location within Venezuela
- Location: Venezuela
- Coordinates: 11°49′N 69°57′W
- Area: 11.9 km^{2} (4.6 sq mi)
- Established: June 14, 1972

The Cerro Santa Ana Natural Monument (Spanish: Monumento Natural Cerro Santa Ana) Is a protected area with a natural monument status located in the center of the Paraguaná peninsula north of the Falcón state in the jurisdiction of the municipalities Falcón and Carirubana, between the populations of Santa Ana and Buena Vista, in the South American country of Venezuela. It has an area of 1900 hectares and a maximum height of 830 masl. It was declared Natural Monument on June 14, 1972 according to Decree No. 1.005, under the protection of INPARQUES.

Unlike the rest of the peninsula Santa Ana Hill has as characteristics the contrast of its greenery with the xerophytic vegetation of the area of Paraguaná.

It has three peaks: Santa Ana (highest), Buena Vista and Moruy. In the ascent there are progressive changes in climate and vegetation. In the lower parts a dry environment of xerophytic vegetation predominates with thorny forest, while in the higher parts a woody vegetation develops, with leafy trees of 10 to 15 meters in height, with abundant epiphytes, mosses and lichens favored by the high humidity.

Its fauna is predominantly the birds that live in the humid jungle.

== Gallery ==
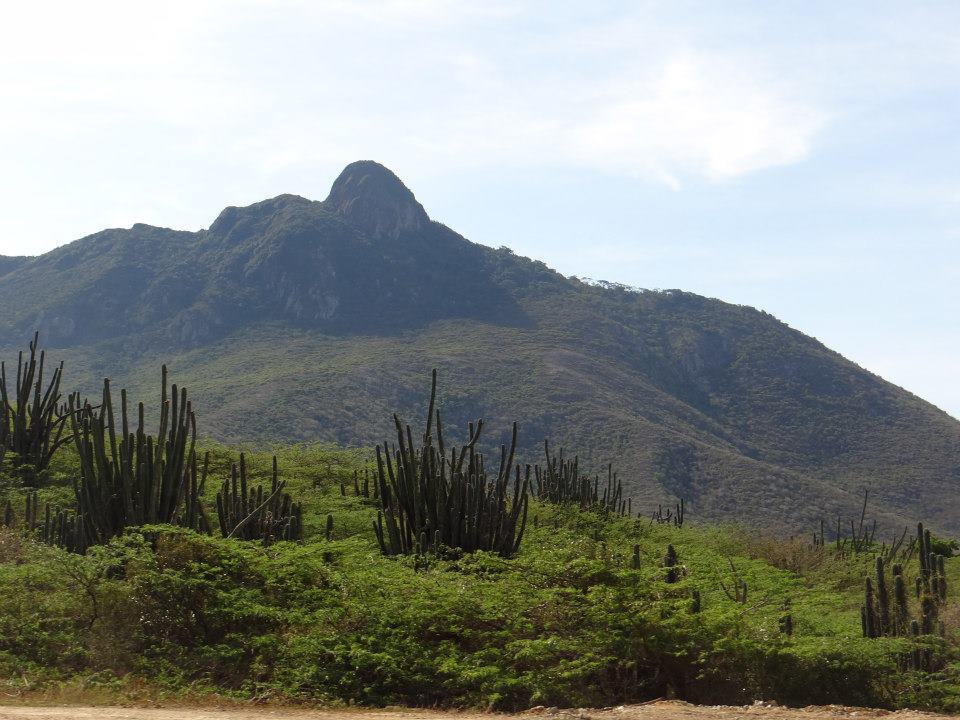

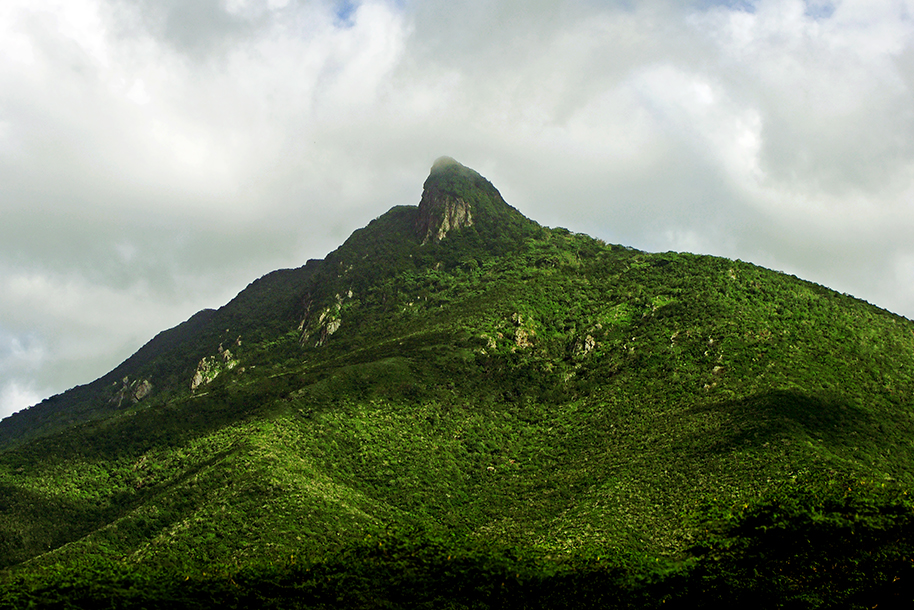

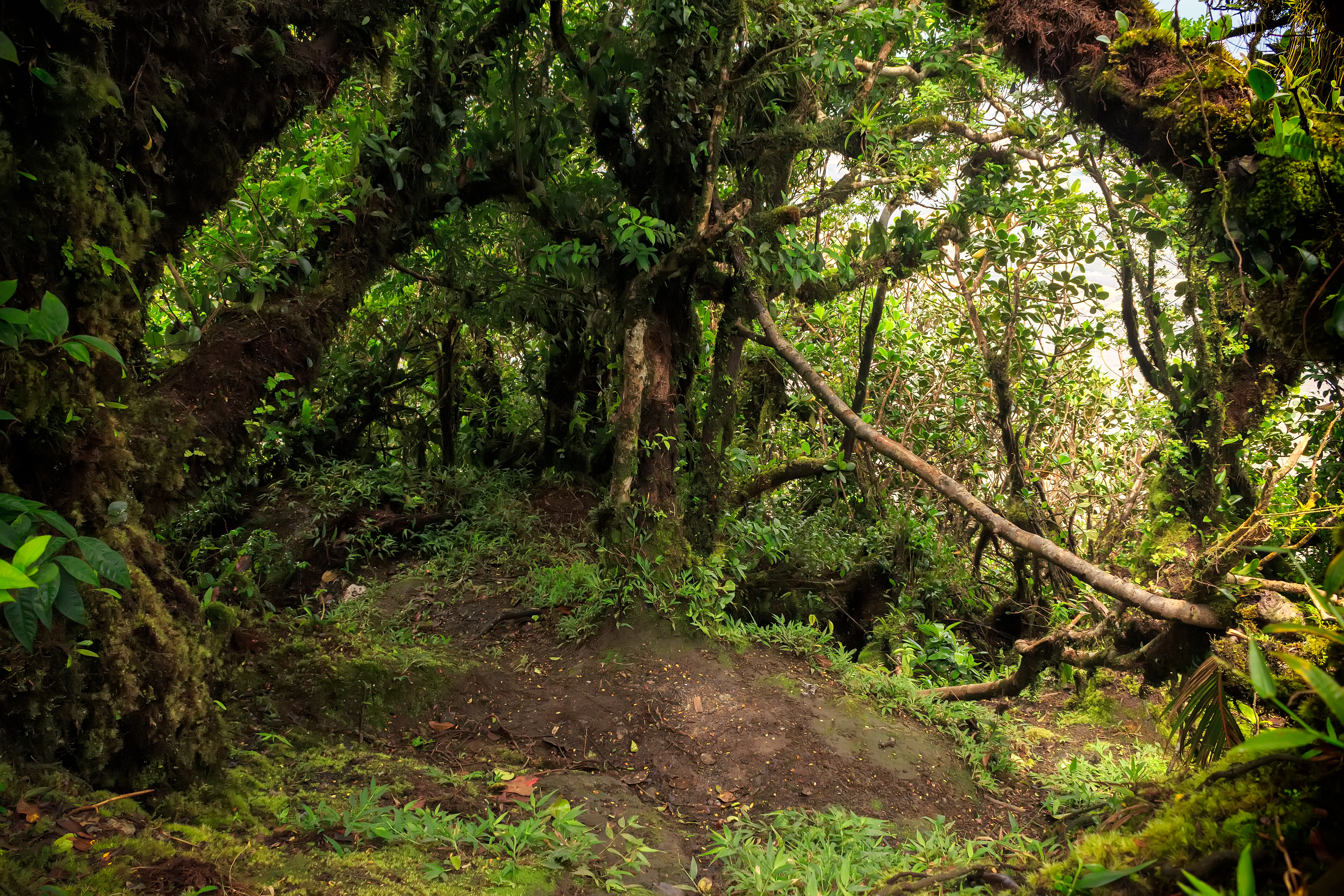

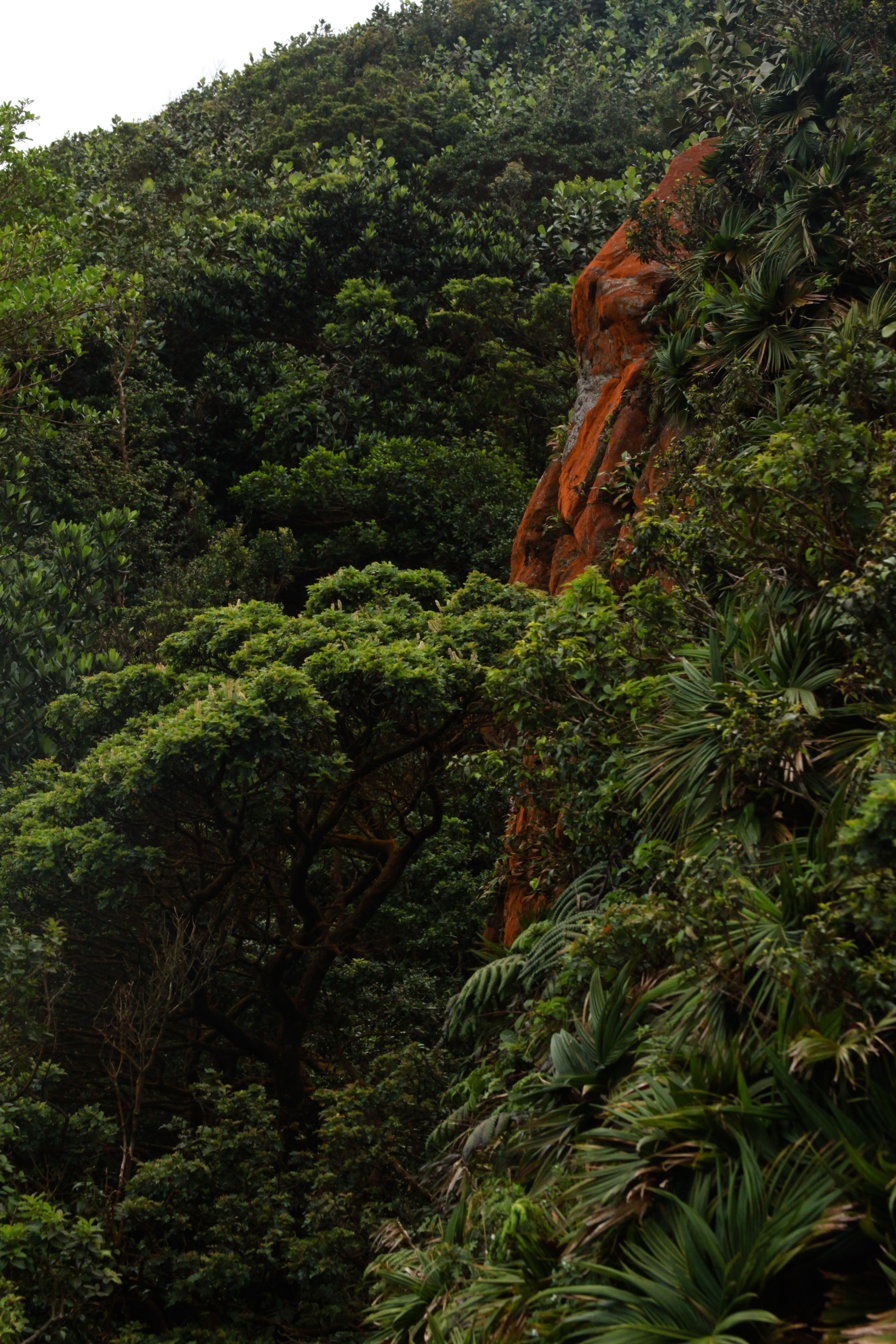

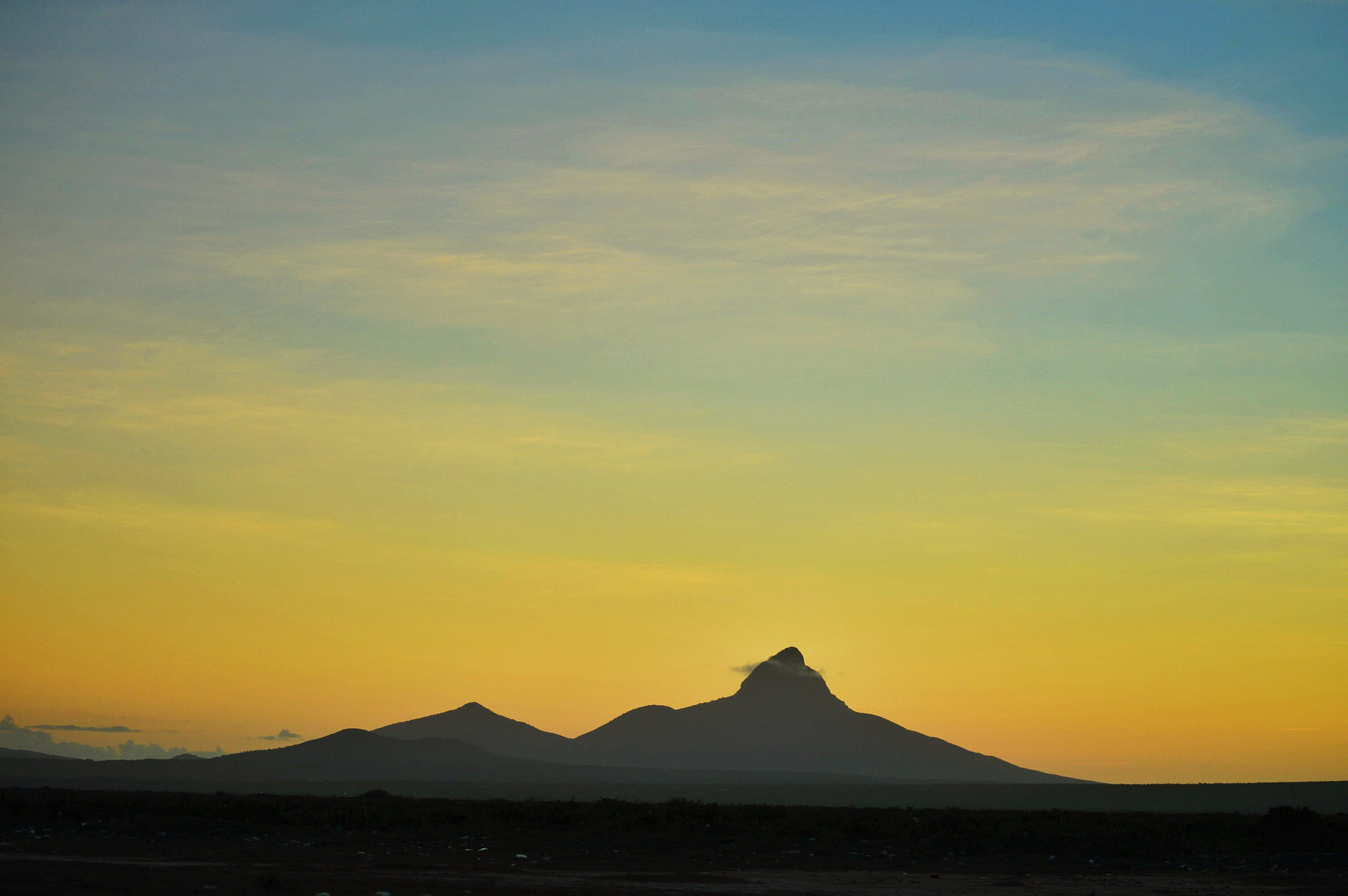

== See also ==
- List of national parks of Venezuela
- Aristides Rojas Natural Monument
