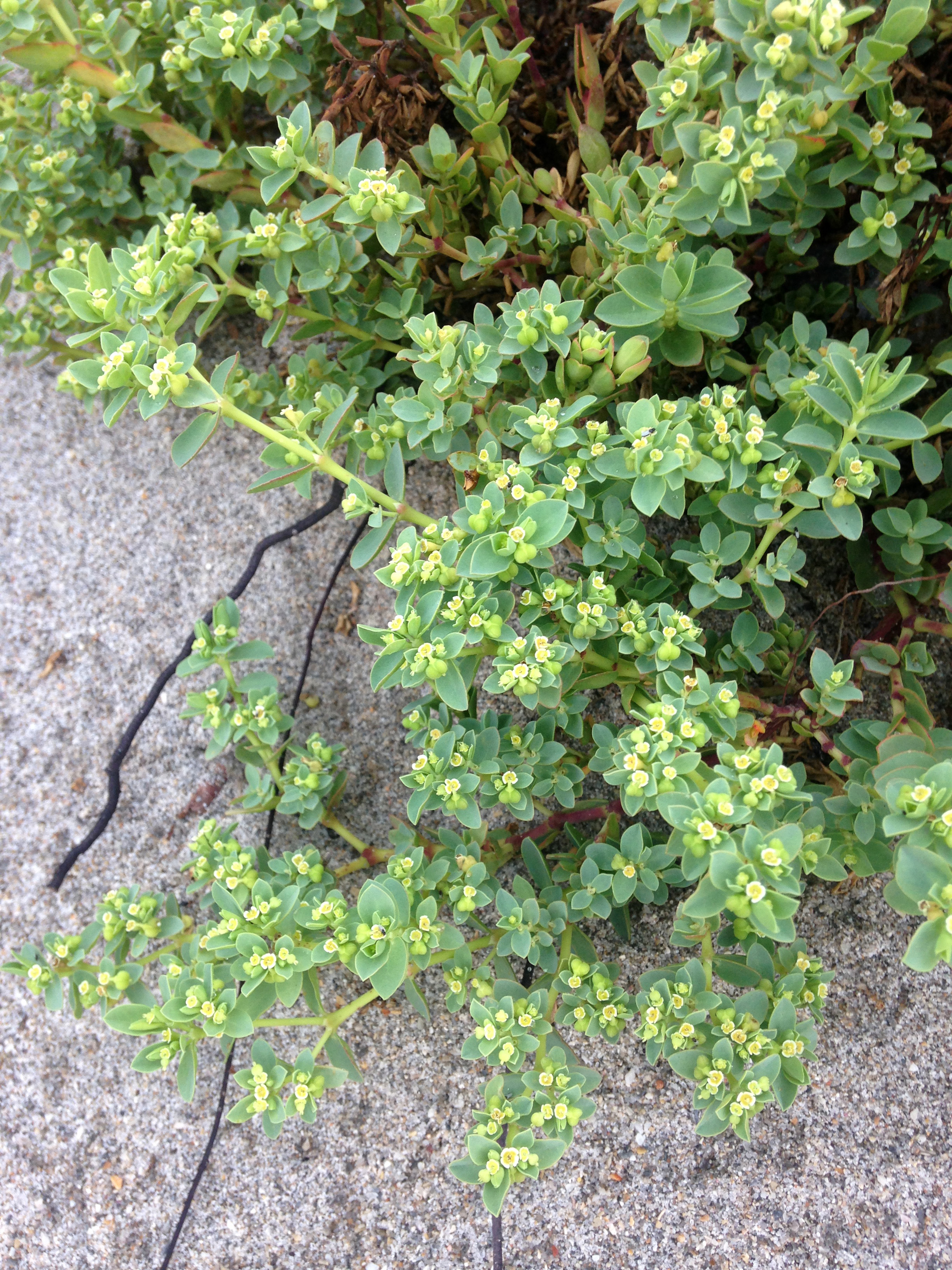
- Euphorbia mesembrianthemifolia on oceanside face of sand dunes at Dr. Von D. Mizell-Eula Johnson State Park, Broward County, Florida

Scientific classification
- Kingdom: Plantae
- Clade: Tracheophytes
- Clade: Angiosperms
- Clade: Eudicots
- Clade: Rosids
- Order: Malpighiales
- Family: Euphorbiaceae
- Genus: Euphorbia
- Species: E. mesembryanthemifolia

Binomial name
- Euphorbia mesembryanthemifolia Jacq.

Synonyms
- Chamaesyce mesembryanthemifolia (Jacq.) Dugand; Euphorbia mesembrianthemifolia orth. var.

= Euphorbia mesembryanthemifolia =

Species of flowering plant

Euphorbia mesembryanthemifolia is a species of flowering plant in the spurge family (Euphorbiaceae). Common names include seaside spurge and coastal beach sandmat; Spanish: alfombra de arena costera, lit. "coastal sand carpet". It is native to the Western Hemisphere, where it is found in coastal areas from Florida in the United States south to Colombia and Venezuela, as well as in Bermuda and the Caribbean. Its natural habitat is on beaches and rocky shores.

Euphorbia mesembryanthemifolia is an erect or sprawling subshrub with opposite, glaucous leaves. It flowers year-round.

== Gallery ==
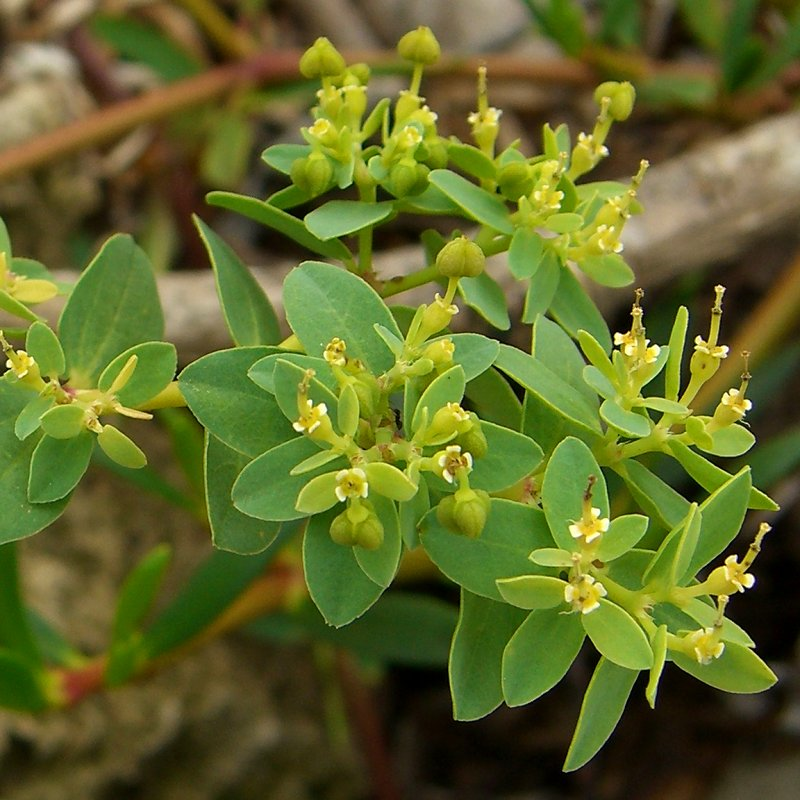
Flowers and fruits. Buttonwood Bay, Upper Keys, Florida Keys

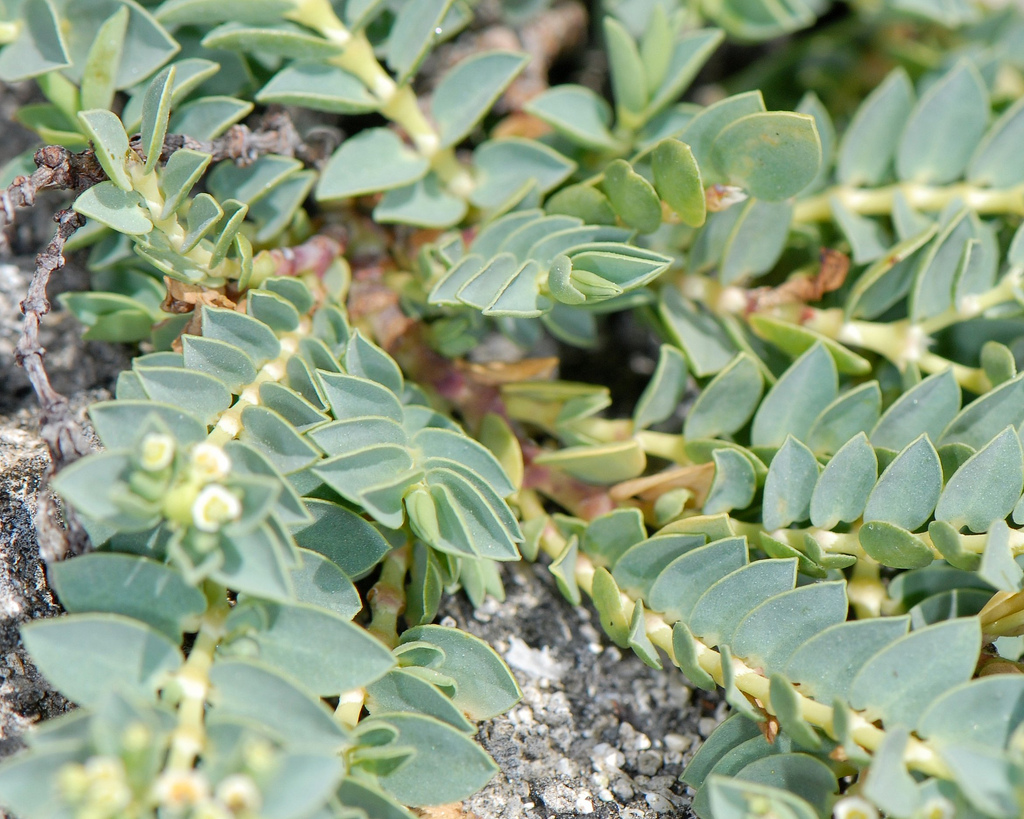
Leaf arrangement. Spittal Pond Nature Reserve, Smith's Parish, Bermuda

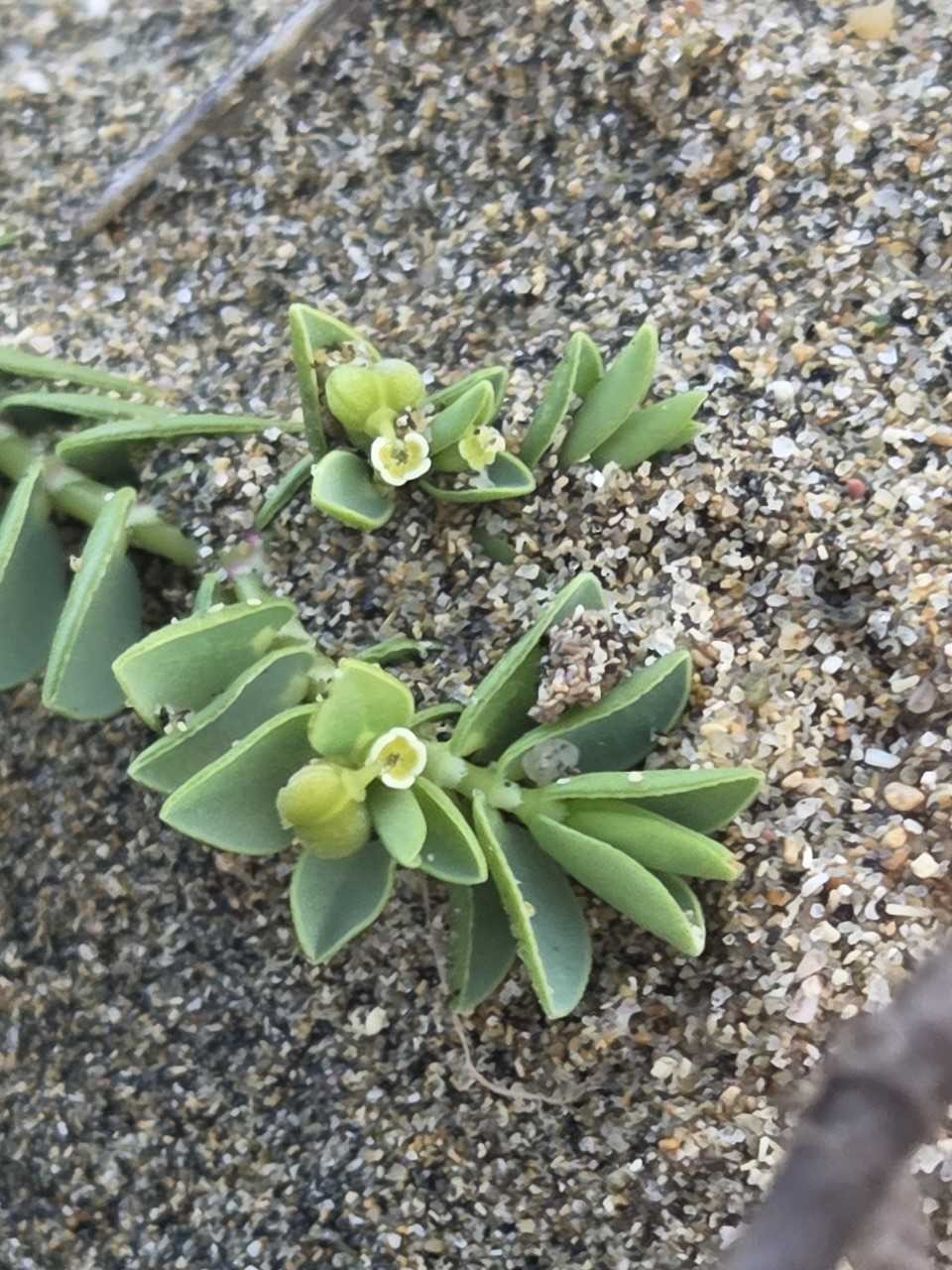
Cup-like leaves capturing sand grains on seaside sand dunes in Isabela, Puerto Rico

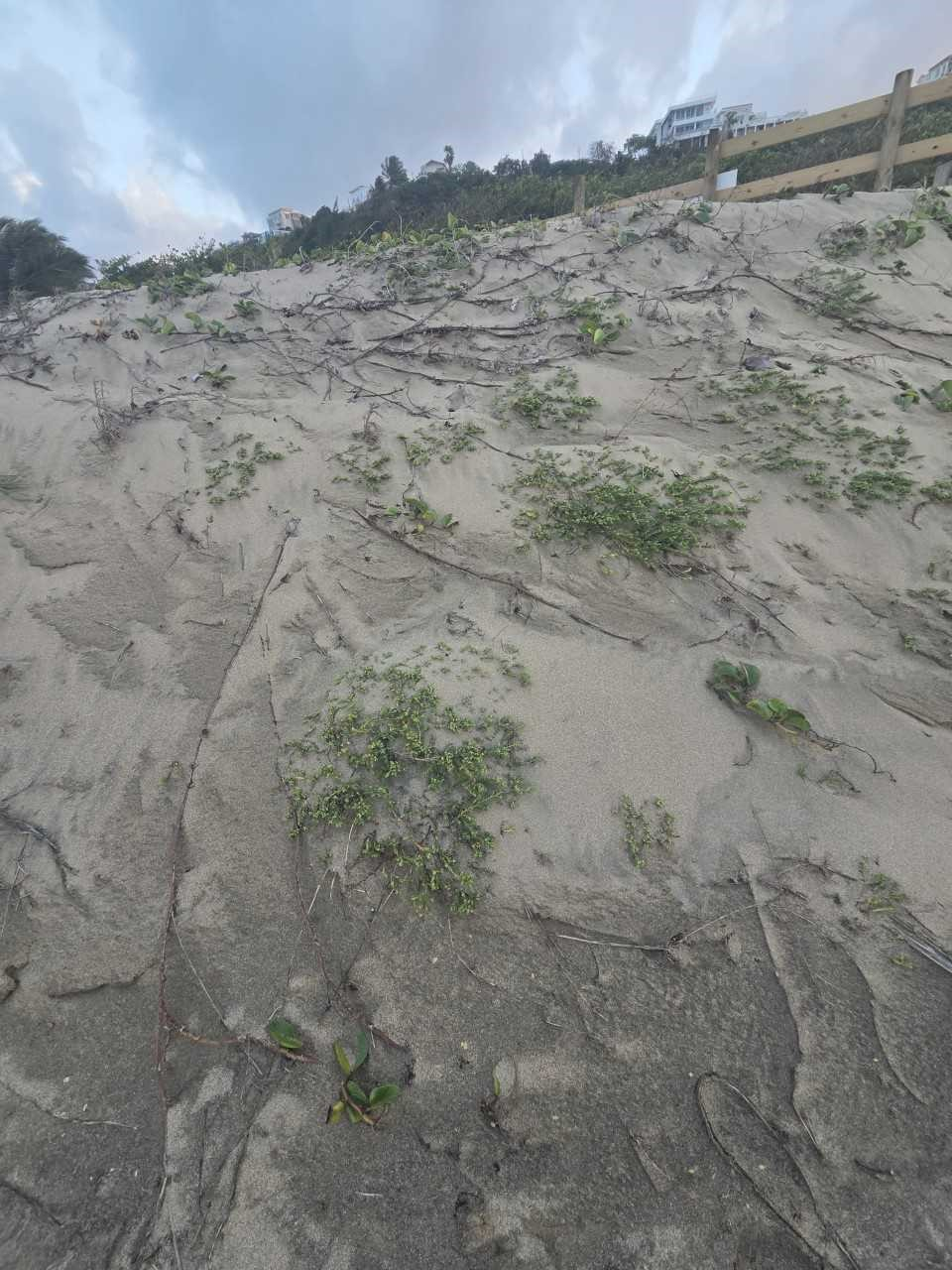
Growing on sand dunes in Isabela, Puerto Rico
