= Abraham Mijares-Urrutia =

Venezuelan herpetologist

- Scientific career
- Fields: Herpetology
- Institutions: Centro de Investigaciones en Ecología y Zonas Áridas, Francisco de Miranda University

Abraham Mijares-Urrutia is a Venezuelan herpetologist.

He is specialized in amphibian and reptiles from the northern South America and Australia. He works at CIEZA, Centro de Investigaciones en Ecología y Zonas Áridas of the Francisco de Miranda National Experimental University in Venezuela. He described multiple species from for the first time mainly from Venezuela, working together with among others Enrique La Marca and Wolfgang Wüster. The snake species Atractus mijaresi was named in his honor in 2005.

== Taxa described ==
- Bufo sclerocephalus
- Euspondylus monsfumus
- Dendropsophus amicorum
- Dendropsophus yaracuyanus
- Drymarchon caudomaculatus
- Marisora falconensis
- Mannophryne caquetio
- Mannophryne lamarcai
- Tepuihyla celsae

== Taxa named in his honor ==
- Atractus mijaresi Esqueda & La Marca, 2005
