= Coro, Venezuela =

Coro Neu-Augsburg
- City
- Santa Ana de Coro
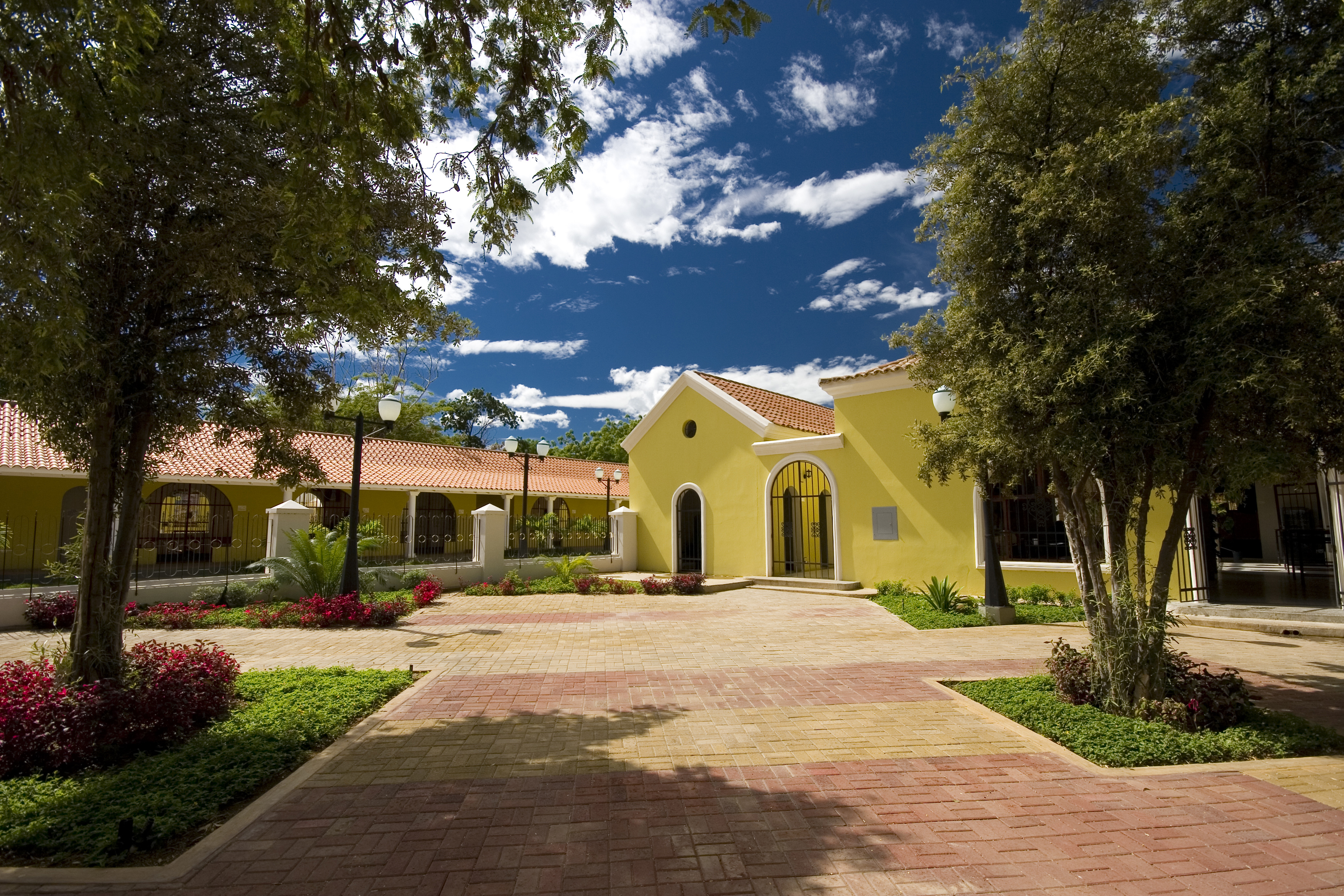
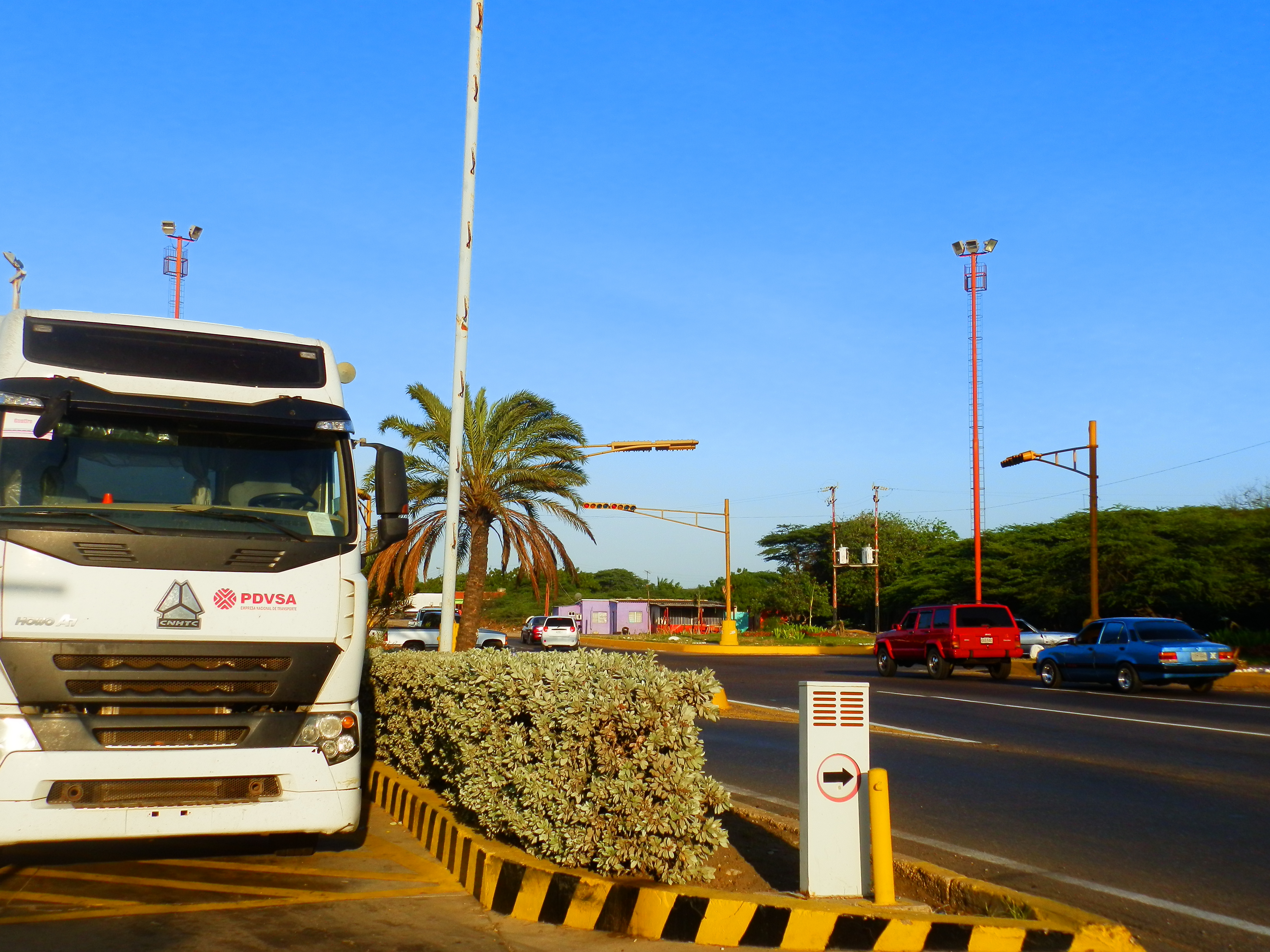
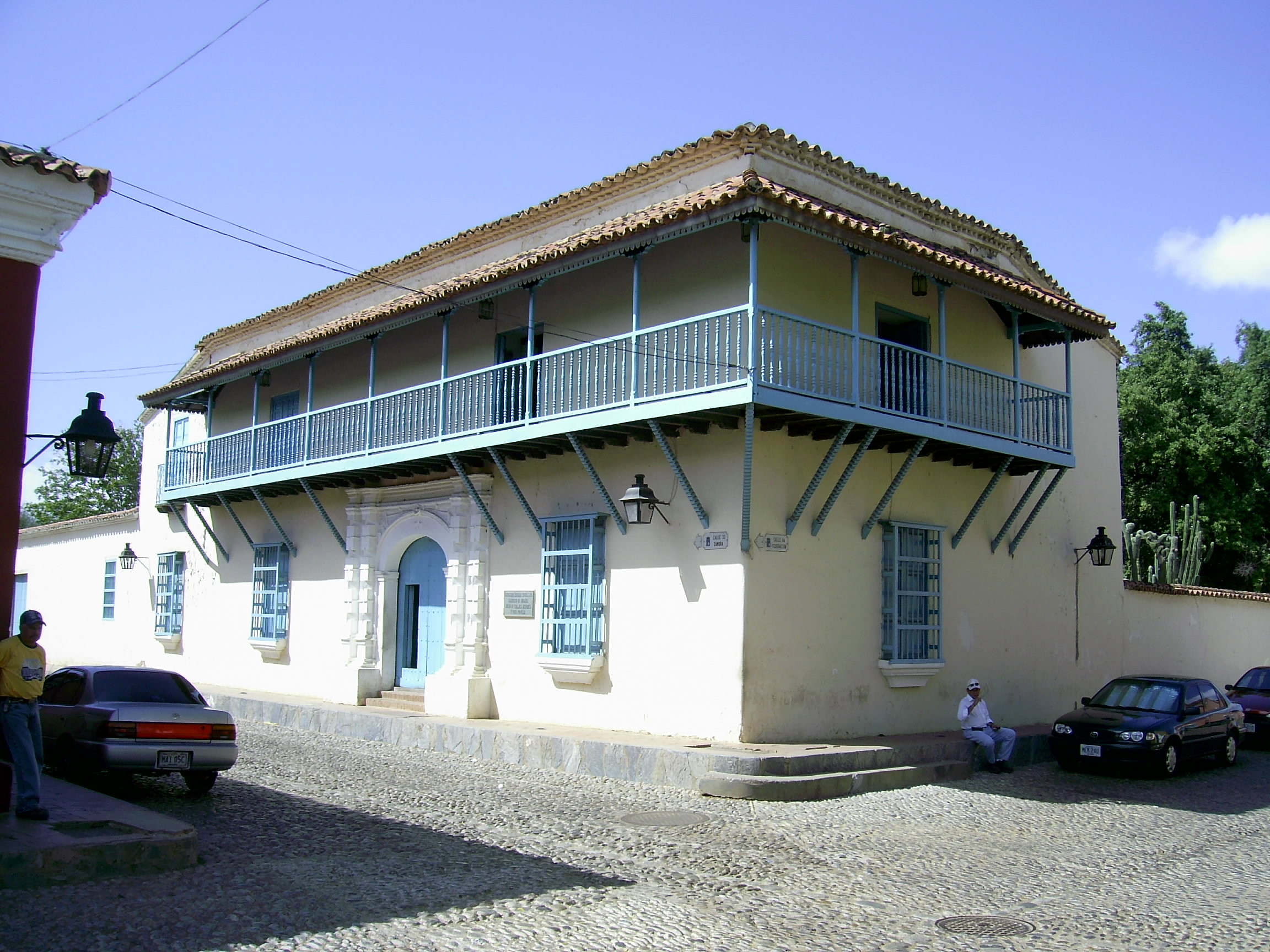
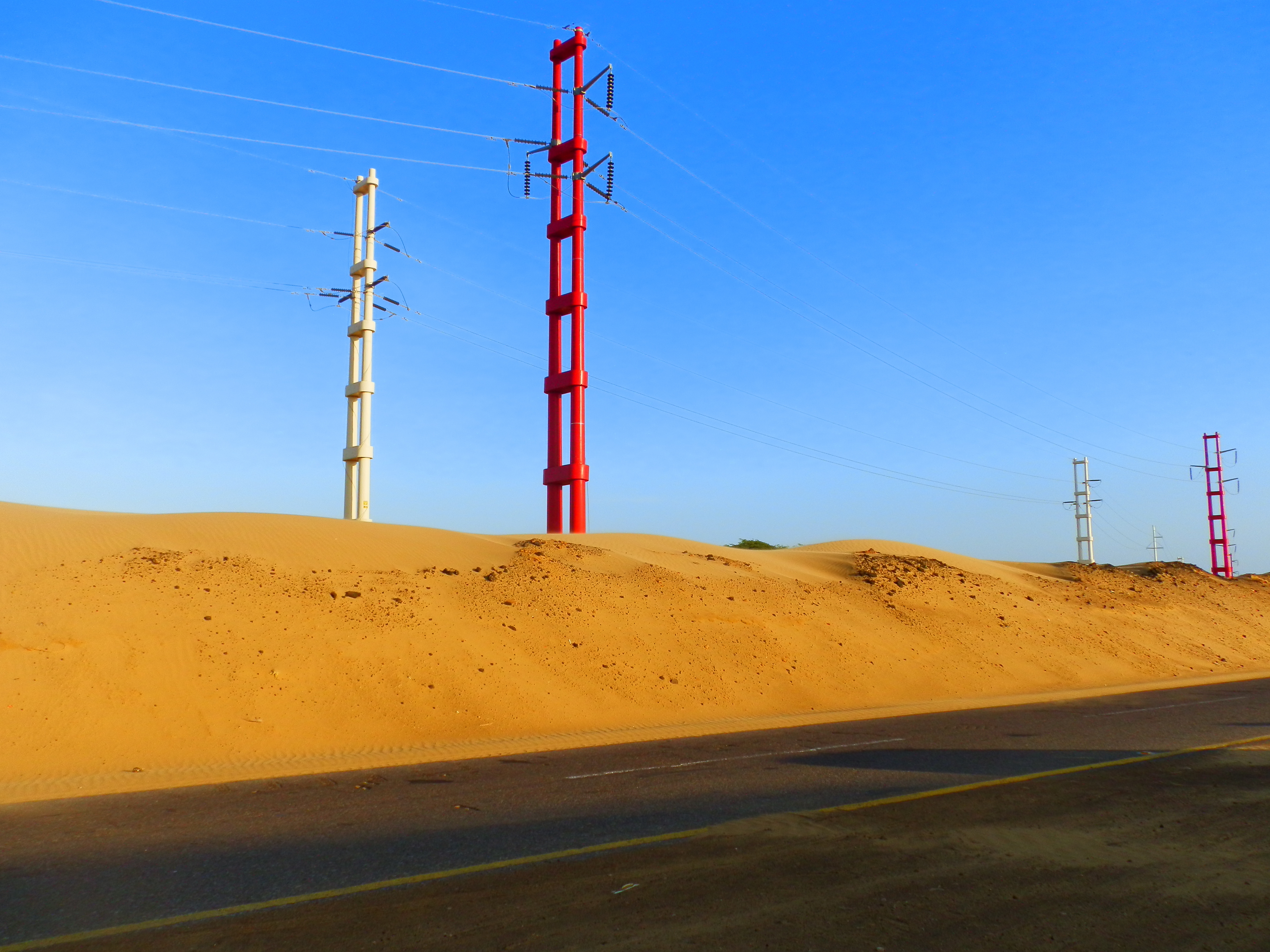
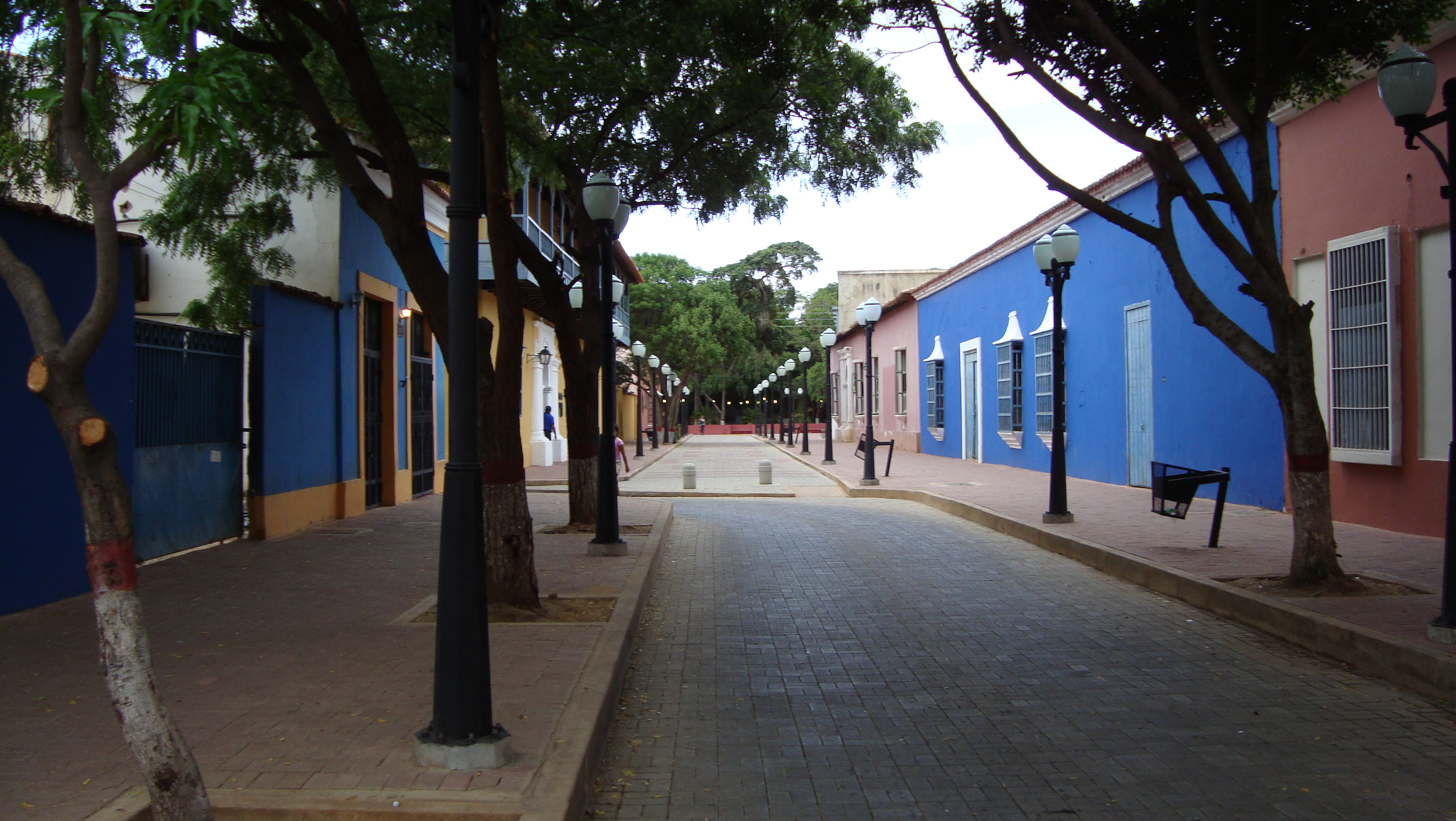
- Historic centre of Santa Ana de Coro, service station, museum, Los Médanos de Coro, and street of Coro.

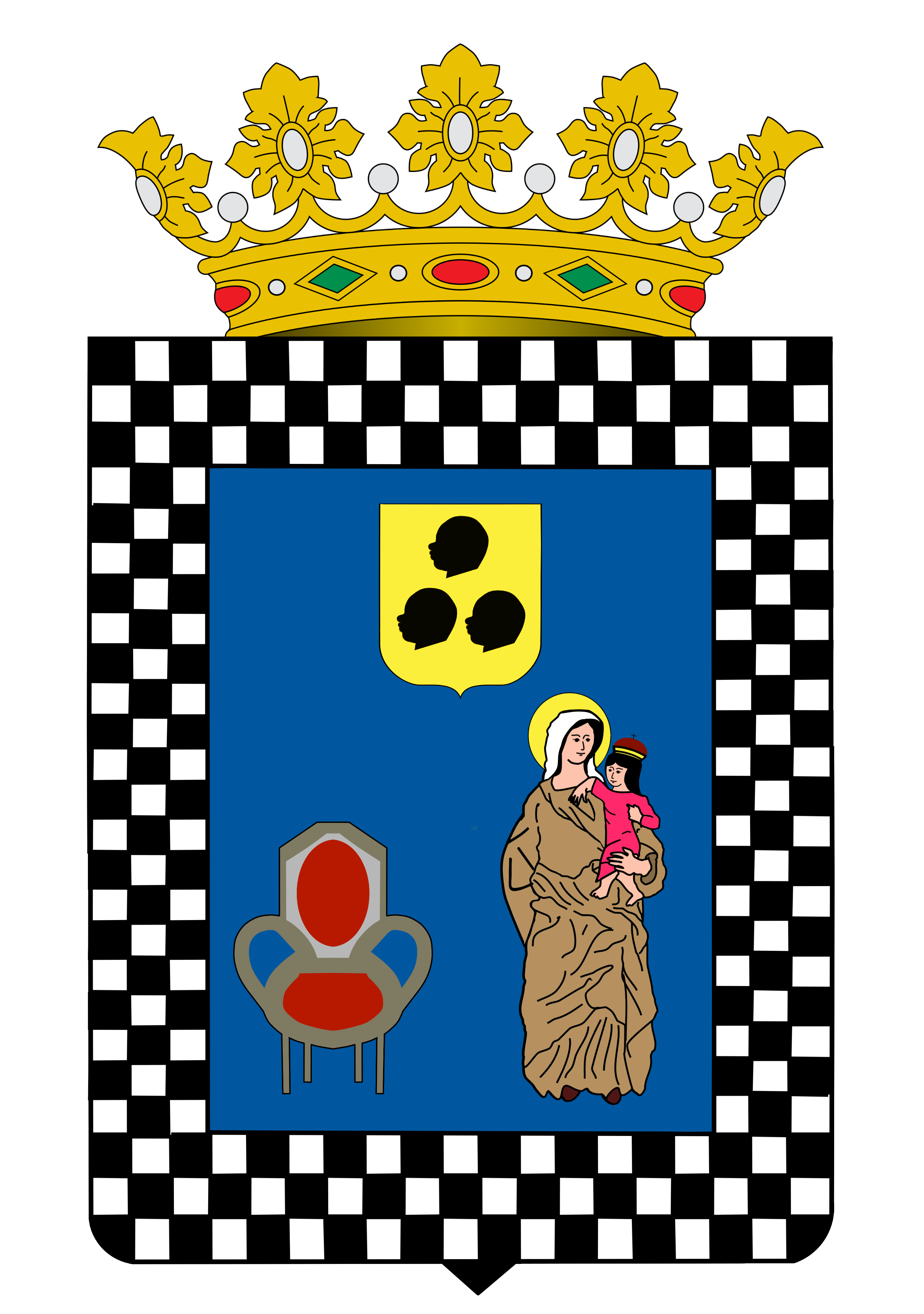
- Coat of arms

- Location within Venezuela
- Coordinates: 11°25′01″N 69°40′12″W
- Country: Venezuela
- State: Falcón
- Municipality: Miranda
- Established: 26 July 1527

Area
  - Total: 45 km^{2} (17 sq mi)

Population (2022)
  - Total: 195,227
  - Density: 4,300/km^{2} (11,000/sq mi)
- Climate: BWh

UNESCO World Heritage Site
- Official name: Coro and its Port
- Criteria: Cultural: iv, v
- Reference: 658
- Inscription: 1993 (17th Session)
- Endangered: 2005 -
- Area: 18.4 ha (45 acres)
- Buffer zone: 186.3 ha (460 acres)

Coro is the capital of Falcón State and the second oldest city in Venezuela (after Cumaná). It was founded on July 26, 1527, by Juan de Ampíes as Santa Ana de Coro. It was historically known as Neu-Augsburg (from 1528 to 1546) by the German Welsers, and Coro by the Spanish colonizers and Venezuelans, the city and buildings were built during the Spanish Empire. It is established at the south of the Paraguaná Peninsula in a coastal plain, flanked by the Médanos de Coro National Park to the north and the Sierra de Coro to the south, at a few kilometers from its port (La Vela de Coro) in the Caribbean Sea at a point equidistant between the Ensenada de La Vela and Golfete de Coro.

It has a wide cultural tradition that comes from being the urban settlement founded by the Spanish conquerors who colonized the interior of the continent. As Neu-Augsburg, it was the first German colony in the Americas under the Welser family of Augsburg (from 1528 to 1546). It was then the first capital of the Spanish Captaincy General of Venezuela (1546–1578) and head of the first bishop founded in South America in 1531. The precursor movement of the independence and of vindication of the dominated classes in Venezuela originated in this region; it is also considered to be the cradle of the Venezuelan federalist movement in the republican era.

Thanks to the city's history, culture and its well-preserved Colonial architecture, "Coro and its port La Vela" was designated in 1993 as a World Heritage Site by UNESCO. Since 2005 it is on the UNESCO's List of World Heritage in Danger.

== Toponymy ==
At its founding the town was called Santa Ana de Coro (there is now an unsuccessful campaign to reinstate the colonial name of the city) in the Spanish style that named new cities in America according to the Catholic calendar, accompanied by a name of Indian origin. According to the tradition the word coro derives from the Caquetio word curiana, meaning "place of winds". However, according to the authoritative DRAE Spanish dictionary, the word coro in its second meaning means "wind of the northwest", and comes from the Latin caurus.

== History ==
=== Early history ===
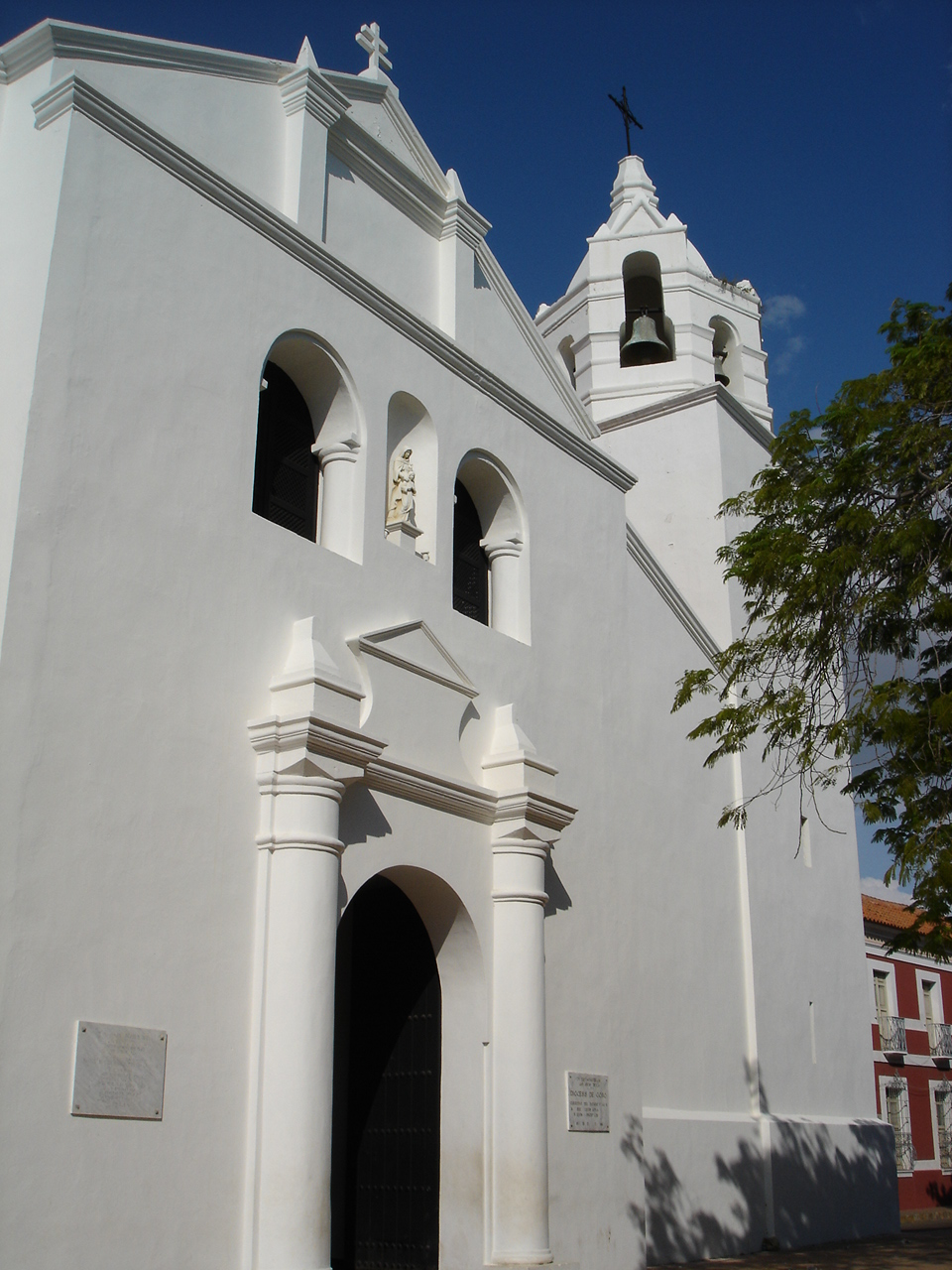
Cathedral of Coro

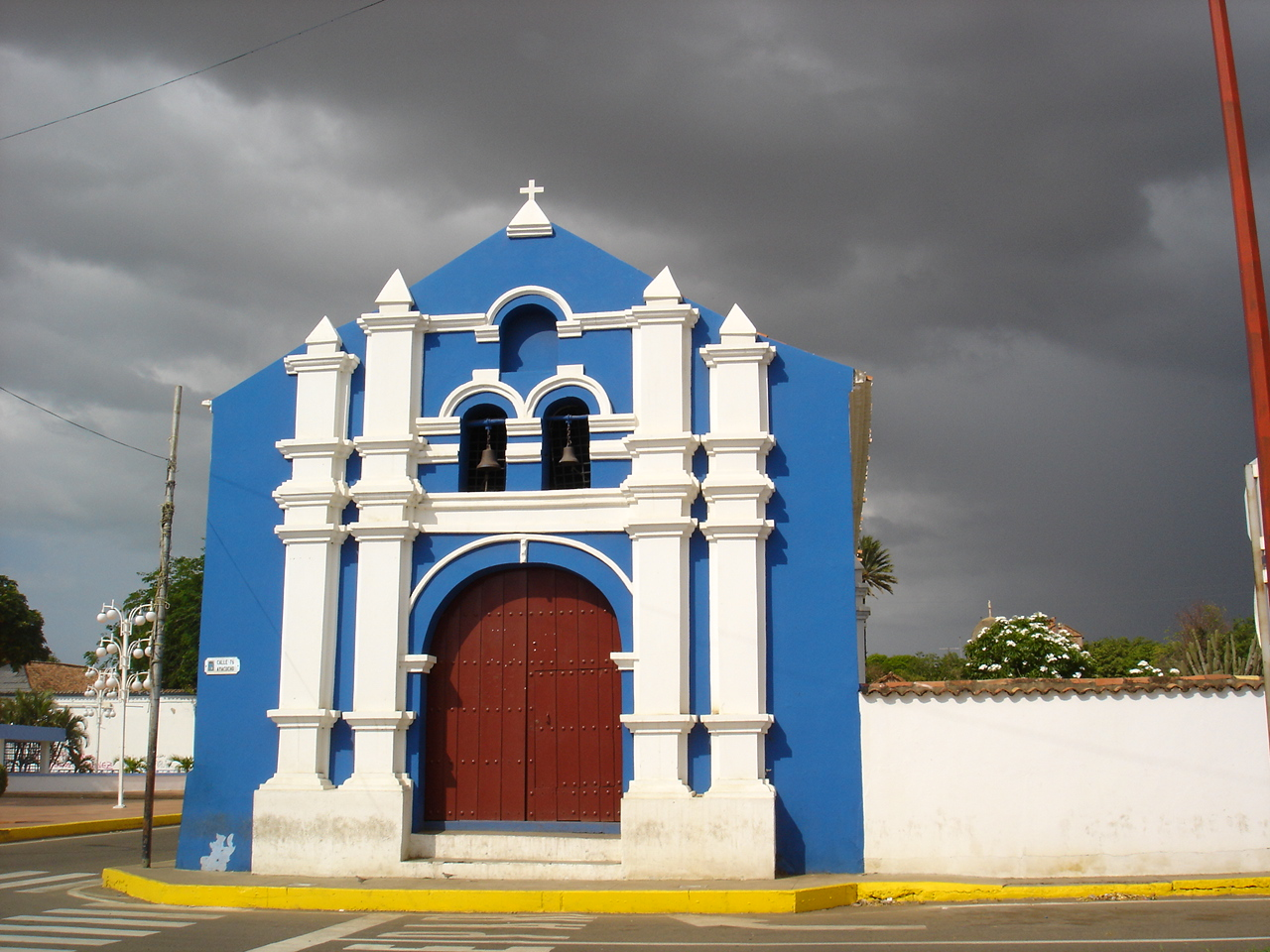
Church of San Nicolás de Bari

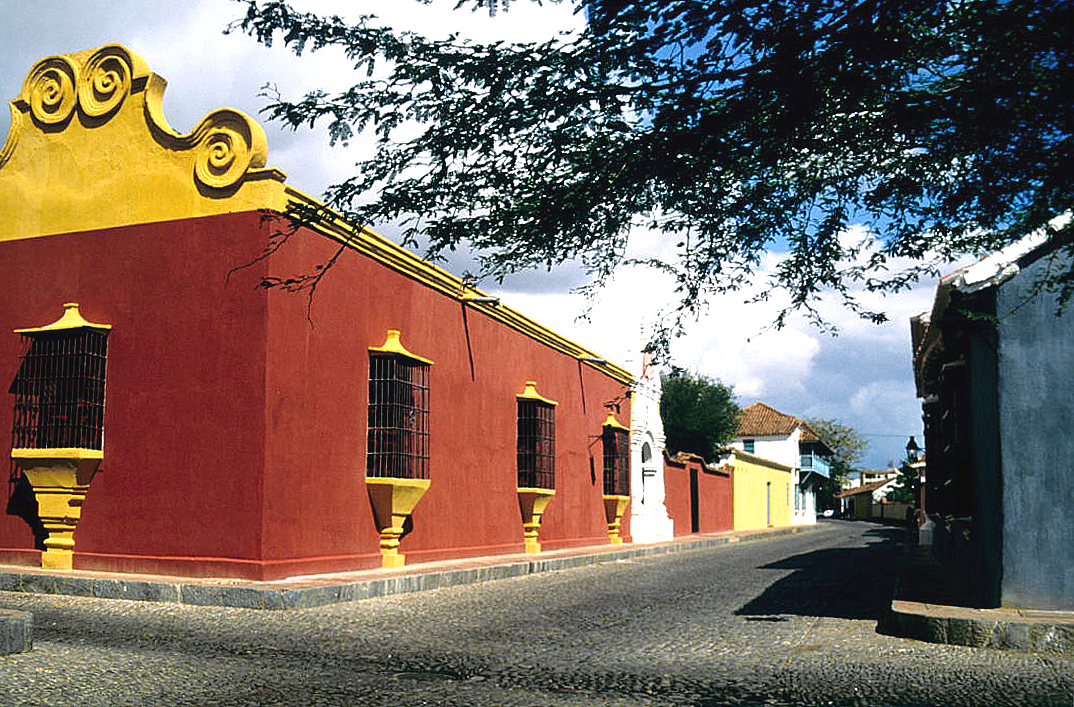
Colonial palace in Coro

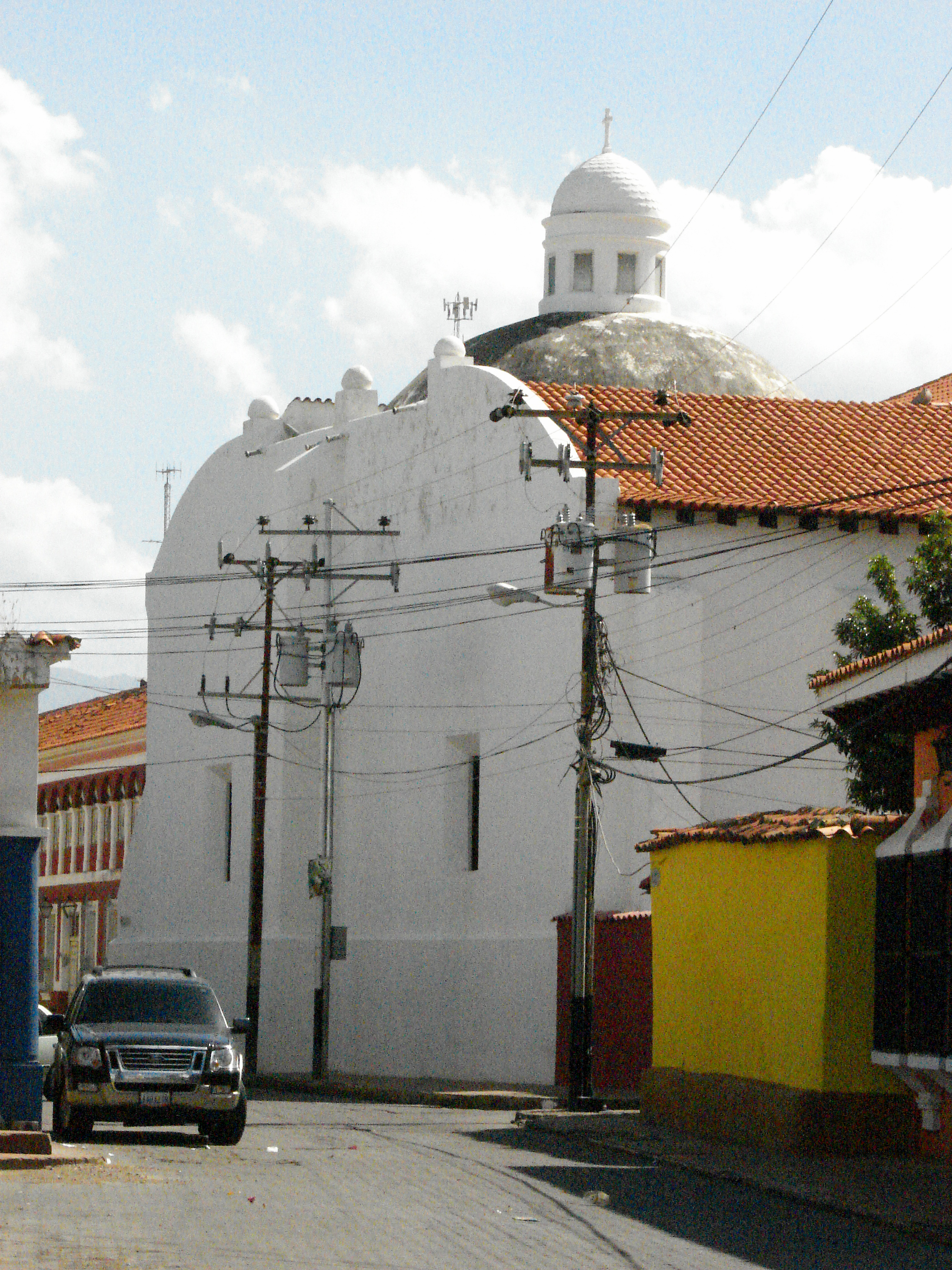
Colonial hermitage in Coro

The city was founded on July 26, 1527, by Juan Martín de Ampués, with the name of Santa Ana de Coro. Ampíes covenanted to respect the authority of the Native chief Manaure highest authority of the natives of the region, the Caquetio people, This covenant is broken abruptly in 1529 with the landing at the city's first Governor and Captain General Ambrosius Ehinger representing the Welser, an Augsburg banking and trading family. The family received the Province of Venezuela (as Klein-Venedig) from the emperor Charles V for exploration, founding cities and exploitation of the resources of this vast territory that stretched from Cabo de la Vela (Guajira Peninsula) to Maracapana (near the city of Barcelona, Anzoátegui). From Coro emerged multiple expeditions to the Venezuelan and Colombian Llanos, the Andes and the Orinoco River in search of El Dorado, which allowed the conquerors to explore these vast territories. The government of the Welsers ends in 1545 for breach of contract and conflict of interests between them and the Spanish conquistadors who explored the territory from other focal points of the Spanish Empire in America. The city is in its early days a "beachhead" or outpost of the Spanish during the conquest and colonization in the western and central Venezuela. From them left the expeditions of exploration and founding of new towns.

Santa Ana de Coro lost the political capital of the Venezuela Province (also known as the Coro Province in official documents of the time) in 1578 to Caracas, motivated by repeated invasions of pirates (the Preston–Somers expedition was one) and especially to the harshness of its climate. Finally it was no longer the seat of the bishopric in 1636.

=== Fall and rise ===
During the seventeenth century Coro was hit by a hurricane and invasions of pirates, to the point where it appeared in the charts of English and French of the time with the title of "destroyed." However, these calamities left intact the countryside, with its productive power, which allowed it to recover slowly. Thus, in the late 18th and early 19th century reaches its colonial peak. Precisely from this period are the best preserved civilian buildings in the city.

In 1795 a slave uprising occurs, and generally dominated social classes in the Sierra de Coro, led by the free zambo José Leonardo Chirino, which was aimed at the elimination of slavery and the establishment of the republican regime known for the time as "the French law". The movement, which would be the forerunner in the independence process would end in defeat, the capture and killing of rebel leader.

=== Independence ===
In 1806 an expedition landed in the port of La Vela de Coro led by Francisco de Miranda. It was intended to be liberating, but was not greeted with enthusiasm by the locals. The expedition is still important as the precursor of the Spanish American wars of independence and in particular for bringing the tricolor, eventually adopted as the flag of Gran Colombia. It is now the basis for the official flag of three American republics, Colombia, Venezuela and Ecuador. The port of La Vela de Coro was where it was raised for the first time in Venezuela.

During the beginning of the Venezuelan War of Independence, Coro, Maracaibo and Guiana did not comply with the provisions of the Junta Suprema de Caracas on April 19, 1810, remaining loyal to Spanish rule. Subsequently, formed a bulwark of the Spanish Empire to land on its coasts the troops that end up destroying the First Republic of Venezuela. In 1821, finally the Coro Province incorporates to the process of independence, with the capture of the city by the troops led by the heroine Josefa Camejo and a group of patriots who came a long time plotting. By the time the General Rafael Urdaneta invades from Maracaibo commanding the Grancolombian army, and the city had been released a few days earlier for the Coro army commanded by Camejo.

The War of Independence and later the civil wars of the 19th century (including the Federal War that began in Coro) leaving the city deserted and destroyed its field, which plunged her into a period of decline that would recover the half- well into the 20th century with the construction of oil refineries in the Paraguaná Peninsula and the changes in Venezuela following the passage of a rural to an urban and oil country.

Since the early 50s Coro was declared a National Heritage.

== Geography ==
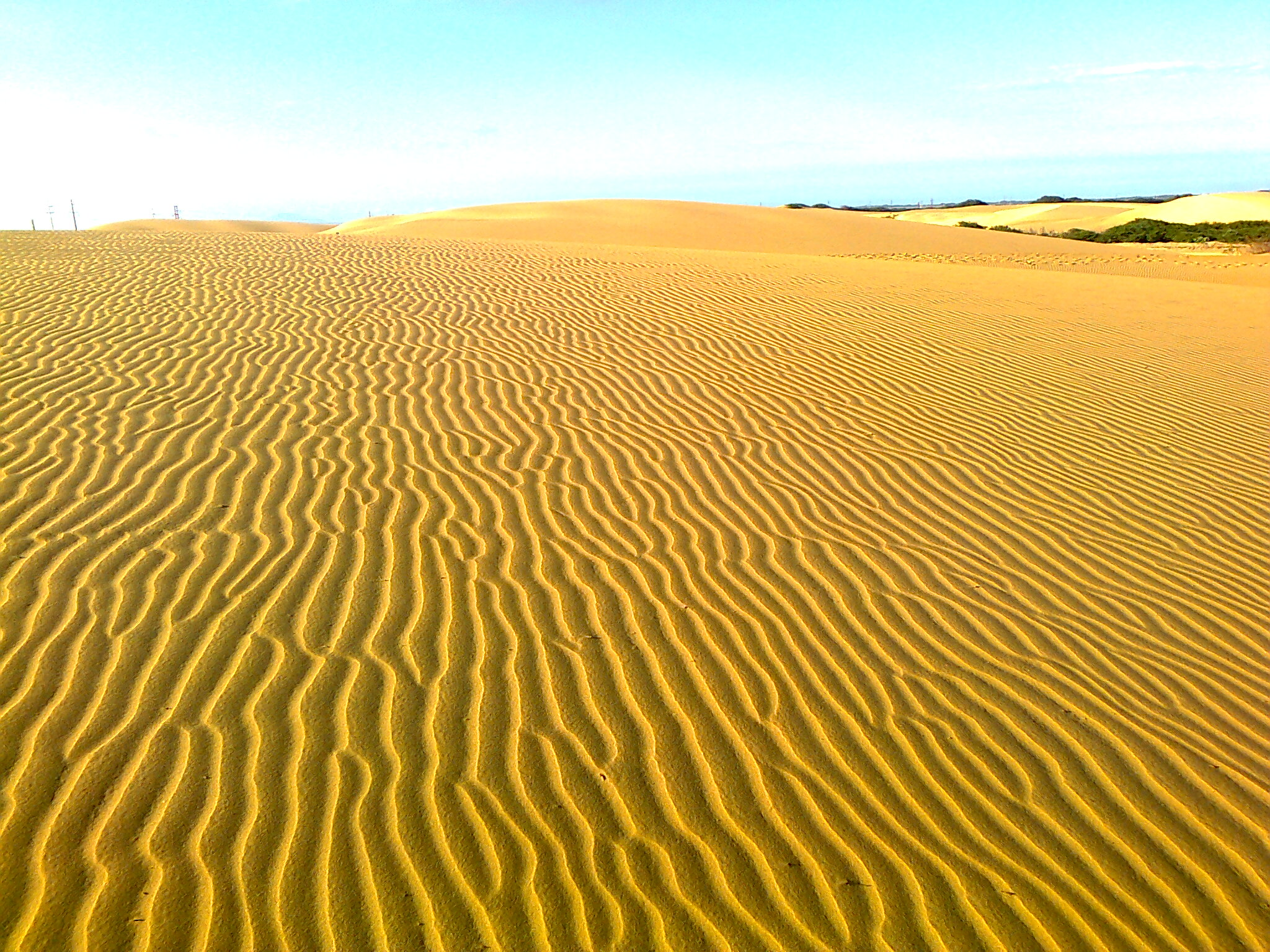
Sand dunes of Médanos de Coro National Park

Coro is located at north of the Coro region, transition between the Venezuelan Coastal Range and the Cordillera de Mérida. Located on a coastal plain of xerophyte vegetation (19 msn) covering the entire western Falcón state and reaches its narrowest point just in the city, closing a few miles east of Coro by foothills of the Sierra de Falcón. To the north lies the Médanos Isthmus, named for it found in a formation of dunes or sand fields that have been formed by persistent trade winds and ocean currents. The isthmus connects the Paraguaná Peninsula with the mainland. at south of the city are the foothills of the Sierra de Falcón.

=== Climate ===
Due to its extremely high potential evapotranspiration, Coro has a hot semi-arid climate (Köppen: BSh) despite receiving an average of approximately 452 millimetres or 18 inches of rainfall per year over 50.1 precipitation days. Humidity remains at a similar level year-round. The highest rainfall occurs between October and December, while March is the driest month. The average temperature is 28.9 °C (84.0 °F), with minimum temperatures of 23 °C (73 °F) and maximum 36 °C (96.8 °F). The city is sunny, averaging over 3100 hours of sunshine a year, with January being the sunniest month. It is characterized by strong winds that can register speeds of 35 kilometres per hour (22 mph; 19 kn).

On 29 April 2015, Coro recorded a temperature of 43.6 °C (110.5 °F), which is the highest temperature to have ever been recorded in Venezuela. Coro has never recorded a temperature below 18.9 °C (66.0 °F).

Climate data for Coro (1991–2020, extremes 1961–2020)
Month	Jan	Feb	Mar	Apr	May	Jun	Jul	Aug	Sep	Oct	Nov	Dec	Year
Record high °C (°F)	37.8 (100.0)	37.8 (100.0)	41.6 (106.9)	43.6 (110.5)	41.4 (106.5)	43.0 (109.4)	43.2 (109.8)	45.0 (113.0)	45.0 (113.0)	41.8 (107.2)	39.3 (102.7)	40.5 (104.9)	45.0 (113.0)
Mean daily maximum °C (°F)	29.9 (85.8)	30.1 (86.2)	31.4 (88.5)	31.9 (89.4)	32.7 (90.9)	33.0 (91.4)	32.9 (91.2)	33.9 (93.0)	34.0 (93.2)	32.3 (90.1)	31.3 (88.3)	30.3 (86.5)	32.0 (89.5)
Daily mean °C (°F)	26.8 (80.2)	27.2 (81.0)	27.8 (82.0)	28.6 (83.5)	29.3 (84.7)	29.4 (84.9)	29.2 (84.6)	29.8 (85.6)	29.8 (85.6)	29.1 (84.4)	28.4 (83.1)	27.4 (81.3)	28.6 (83.4)
Mean daily minimum °C (°F)	23.8 (74.8)	24.0 (75.2)	24.6 (76.3)	25.6 (78.1)	26.3 (79.3)	26.5 (79.7)	26.2 (79.2)	26.6 (79.9)	26.7 (80.1)	26.2 (79.2)	25.6 (78.1)	24.6 (76.3)	25.6 (78.0)
Record low °C (°F)	19.5 (67.1)	19.0 (66.2)	19.0 (66.2)	21.1 (70.0)	20.4 (68.7)	21.8 (71.2)	20.0 (68.0)	21.6 (70.9)	20.5 (68.9)	20.0 (68.0)	20.8 (69.4)	18.8 (65.8)	18.8 (65.8)
Average rainfall mm (inches)	24.5 (0.96)	19.9 (0.78)	21.8 (0.86)	19.0 (0.75)	24.8 (0.98)	26.8 (1.06)	33.5 (1.32)	39.3 (1.55)	43.7 (1.72)	83.9 (3.30)	65.2 (2.57)	57.0 (2.24)	459.4 (18.09)
Average rainy days (≥ 1.0 mm)	3.4	2.3	1.3	1.4	1.2	4.3	4.1	4.9	6.1	8.3	6.3	7.6	50.2
Average relative humidity (%)	69.0	68.5	67.0	69.0	68.5	68.0	67.5	67.0	67.0	70.5	72.0	71.0	68.8
Mean monthly sunshine hours	291.4	268.8	288.3	234.0	248.0	255.0	285.2	288.3	261.0	251.1	252.0	266.6	3,189.7
Mean daily sunshine hours	9.4	9.6	9.3	7.8	8.0	8.5	9.2	9.3	8.7	8.1	8.4	8.6	8.7
Source 1: NOAA (sun 1971–1990)
Source 2: Instituto Nacional de Meteorología e Hidrología (humidity 1970–1998)

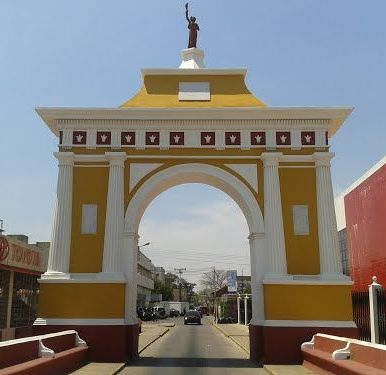
Arco de la Federación

== Politics and government ==
Because of its status as capital of the state, Coro is the urban center around which the political life of Falcón revolves. It serves as the political and administrative capital, where the offices of the state government, governor, Regional Council Legislature, courts, and seat of the Universidad Nacional Experimental Francisco de Miranda are located.

The municipal government is currently led by the PSUV, which was founded by Hugo Chávez. This reflects Venezuela's broader politics, most governors and mayors also initially belonged to Chávez's Movimiento V República. However, in the 2007 referendum, Chávez's party suffered its first defeat in eight years of successive electoral victories. In Coro, 57.08% of voters rejected the reform. However, in the subsequent state elections of 2008, the ruling party (PSUV) won the position for governor of Falcón state, but this candidate received less votes than the opposition party within Coro.

In the September 2010 elections, Coro, along with nearby municipalities, formed Circuit 3 of the state. The ruling socialist party, PSUV, nominated retired general Melvin Lopez Hidalgo, while the democratic MUD ran Gregorio Graterol, former candidate for governor of the state. With more than 52% of the vote, the opposition candidate Gregorio Graterol won the seat of the circuit assembly, representing the fourth consecutive defeat of Chavismo in the city (after the 2007 referendum, the 2008 regional elections, and the referendum).

The community television channel, Coro TV, covers local politics.

== Conservation and World Heritage Site ==
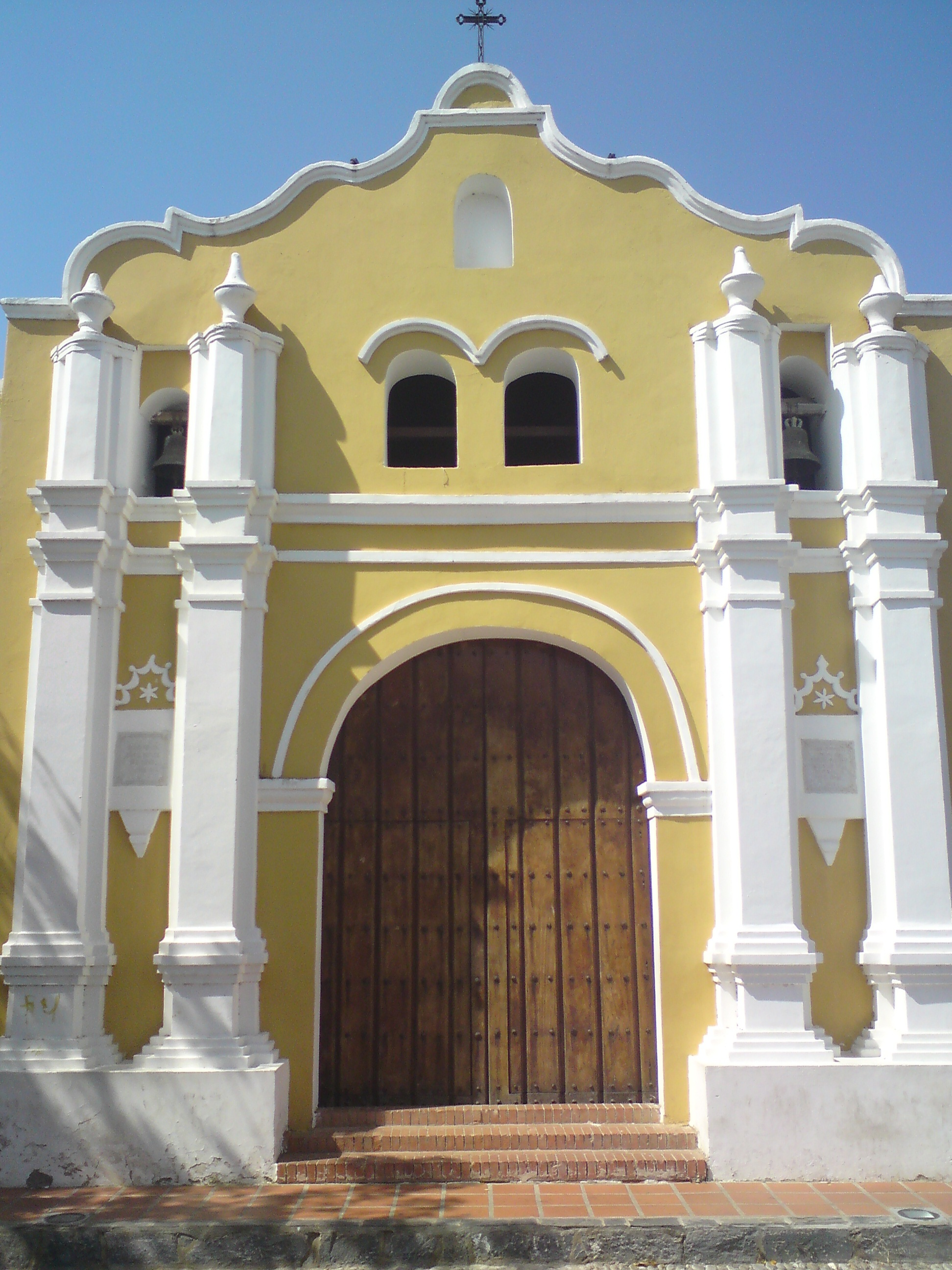
Iglesia de San Clemente.

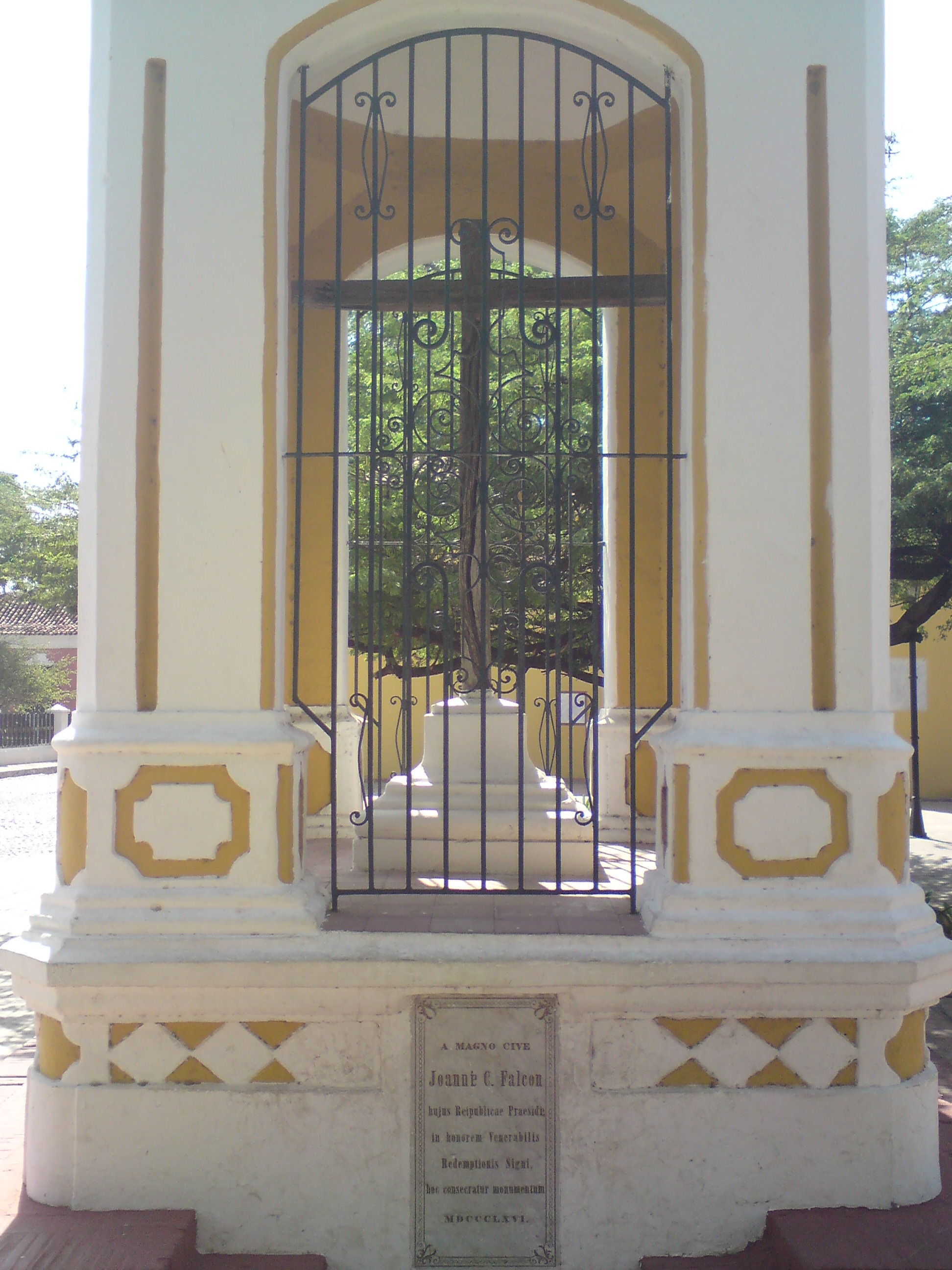
Cruz de San Clemente, cují carved under which Mass for the first time in South America.

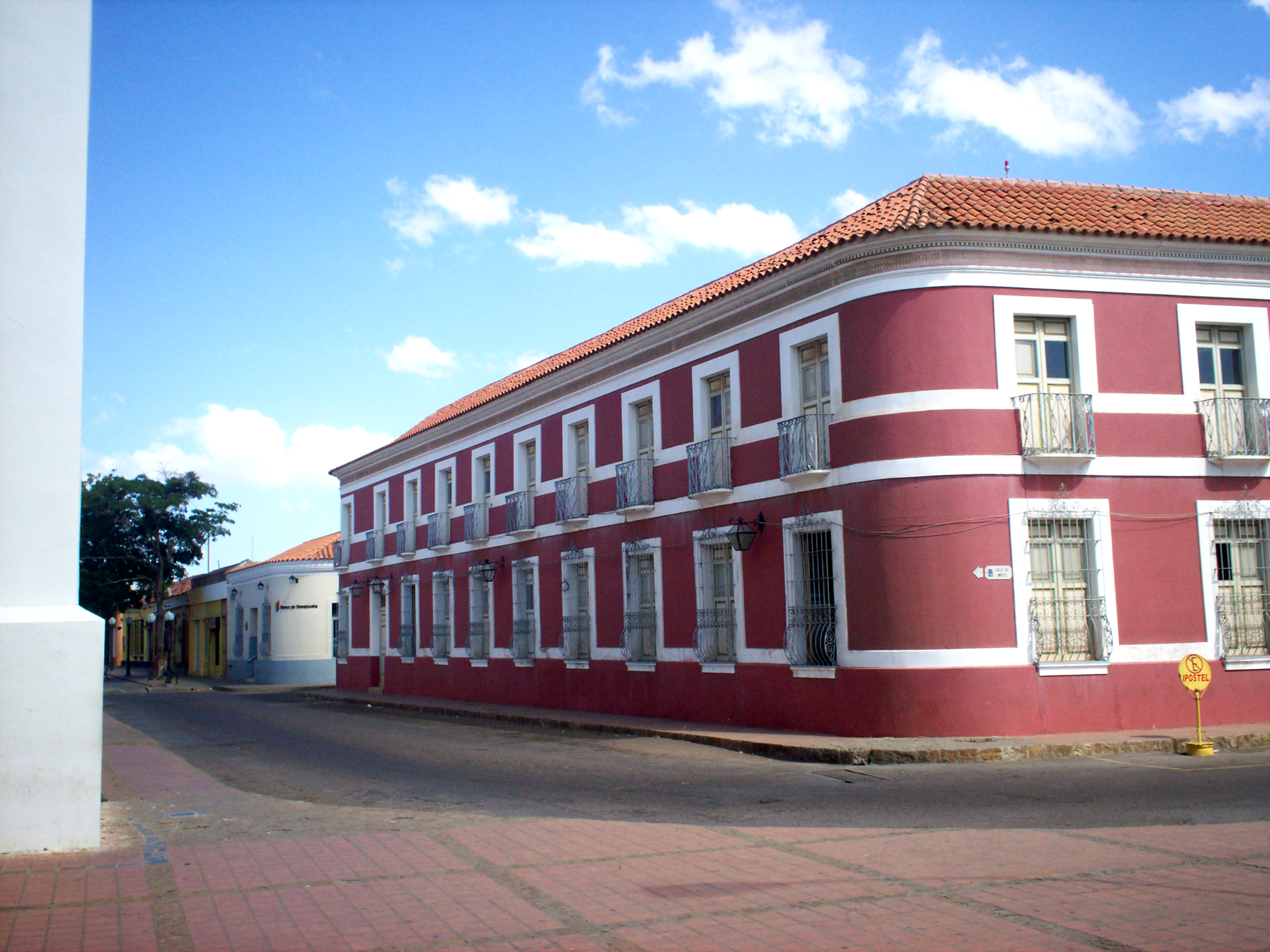
Casa de las 100 ventanas (House of the 100 windows), current headquarters of the Cultural Institute of the State Falcón.

The city has inherited a monumental architecture of the colonial and republican times features typical of the Andalusian architecture (southern Spain), with materials and techniques used by Native Americans based in the mud, like adobe and wattle, which gives it a unique personality. Equally characteristic has a certain pattern that combines traditional Spanish checkerboard layout with an irregular shape typical of medieval German cities, product of the period in which the city was the seat of the domain of Welser. In the central town, some streets end abruptly, breaking the regularity of the Spanish checkerboard. Ambrosius Alfinger (German of the house of the Welsers and first Governor of the Province of Venezuela) restructures the layout of the streets based on the original layout of the founding of the city.

With its earthen constructions unique in the Caribbean, Coro is the surviving example of the rich fusion of indigenous traditions with the Spanish Mudéjar architectural techniques and irregular shape of German Welser architecture. It is one of the first colonial cities, was founded in 1527, and its colonial architecture prevails until today. Over 600 buildings have been appointed in Coro as heritage.

The historic centre remains characteristics typical of a city of the 18th and 19th centuries, with cobbled stone streets and colonial buildings. This is an important colonial city resort and the largest complex of colonial temples in Venezuela. It contains a variety of museums with a broad representation of Catholic iconography or national historical value, so it is called "la ciudad museo". For these reasons it is declared, along with its nearby port of La Vela de Coro, a World Heritage Site on December 9, 1993, by Unesco in meeting held in the Colombian city of Cartagena de Indias.

Since 2005 Coro has been officially listed as an "endangered" World Heritage Site (see List of World Heritage in Danger). Heavy rains (notably in 2004–2005, 2010 and 2022), acting on the site’s vulnerable earthen architecture (adobe and bahareque) and compounded by inadequate long-term maintenance, drainage problems and incomplete conservation efforts, have caused significant damage and contributed to the site’s inclusion on UNESCO’s List of World Heritage in Danger since 2005. Coro's traditional buildings were built with techniques based on the use of earth (adobe, and earth reinforced with a plant structure in a technique called "bahareque"). Many of these buildings are vulnerable to heavy rains, as in its natural state earth is a material of low resistance to moisture.

As well as the damage from rains between November 2004 and February 2005, the built environment had, according to UNESCO, been adversely affected by the construction of inappropriate walls and fences. There has also been concern about the construction of a new monument, beach walkways and a gateway to the city in the port of La Vela de Coro: these could have a considerable impact on the value of the site.

In 2018 it was noted that while information provided by the "State Party" (i.e. Venezuela) demonstrated satisfactory advances in the implementation of many corrective measures, further information and actions were needed to ensure that the key issues previously identified as affecting the property have been adequately addressed.

=== Monuments and tourist attractions ===
From its historic colonial architecture to its diverse landscapes, Coro provides various forms of tourist attraction. In the extreme northeast of the city are the Médanos de Coro National Park, large dunes that are the only desert in Venezuela. They are located along the road that runs between the colonial area of the city to the port of La Vela de Coro. The colonial town, a World Heritage Site, preserves a typical urban landscape of the 18th and 19th centuries, with its cobbled streets and hundreds of historic and traditional buildings. Some architectures reflects a Mudéjar style, while others reflect the cultural influence of the Netherlands through the colony of Curaçao. In the city there are interesting Catholic and secular buildings, that were the scene of numerous events of historic significance, since the early republican period. Probably the architectural influences of Coro are unique.

Among the buildings and places of interest highlights include:

Cathedral of Coro

Since the creation of the Diocese of Coro by the papal bull of July 21, 1531, it directed the building of the Cathedral of St. Anne, one of the temples of Coro, and in 1567 the cathedral was sacked by the Corsair Francis Drake. The current structure dates from 1583 and was completed by the end of the 17th century, making it the oldest Catholic church in Tierra Firma.

Casa de las Ventanas de Hierro

Magnificent mansion built in the 17th century by Don José Francisco Garcés de la Colina. This is a house that has a portal that rises to more than eight feet (2.4 m) high, and so named because of the large windows protected by a wrought iron structure that was imported from Andalusia.

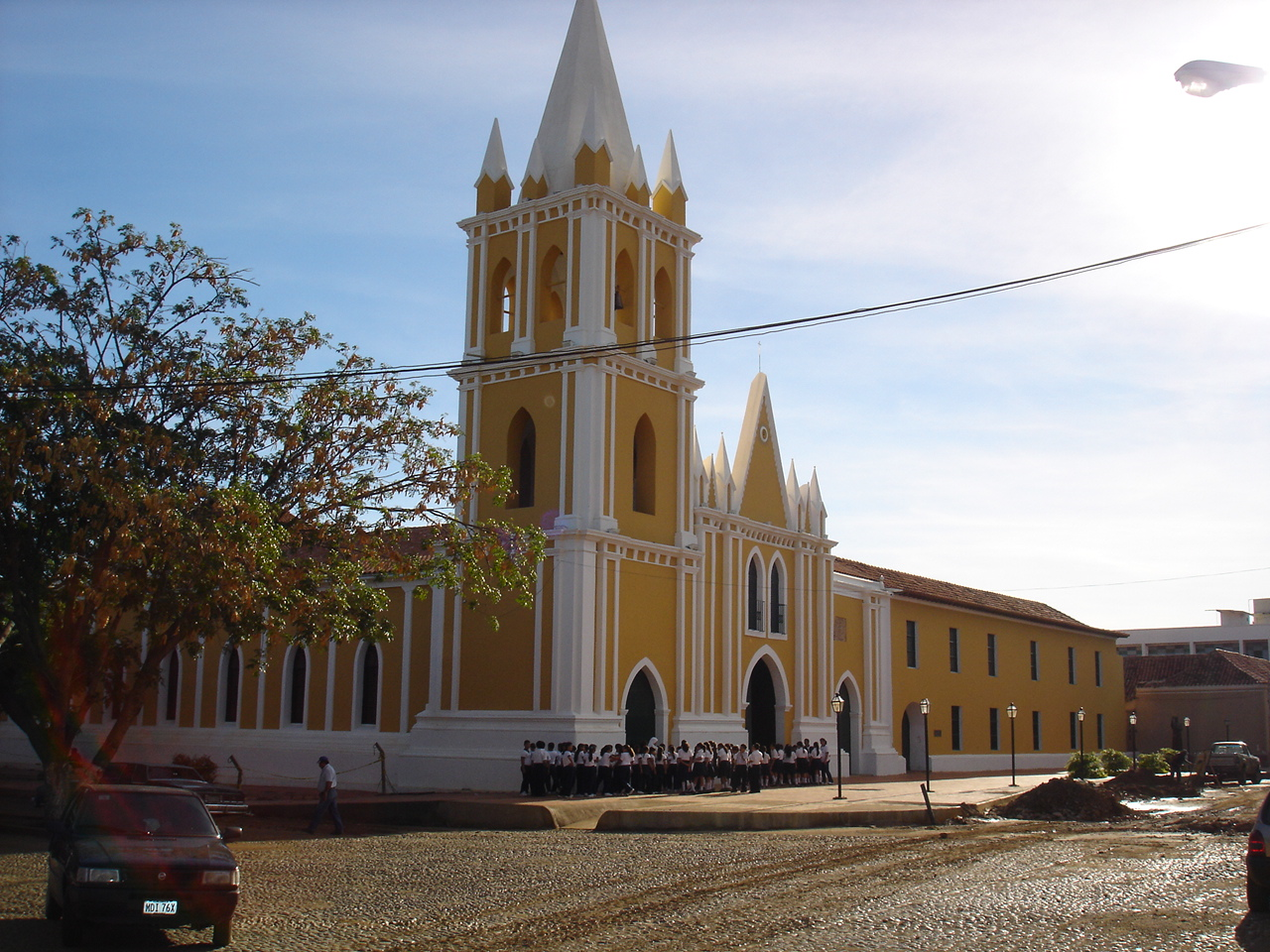
Colonial Church of San Francisco and diocesan museum.

Iglesia y Convento de San Francisco

This religious complex consists in a church with three naves and an annex building that was a Franciscan monastery, which now houses the Diocesan Museum "Lucas Guillermo Castillo ". It begins to build in the 16th century and was destroyed by pirates in 1620. Its neo-Gothic tower is of more recent construction stands over 50 meters, which makes it the highest of all assets. In 1985 the Lucas Guillermo Castillo Museum managed to acquire a place called La Casa Manzano Campuzano or Casa de los Capriles next to the convent.

Iglesia de San Clemente

It has its origins in a church commanded to be built by the founder of the city Juan de Ampíes in the 16th century. It is a cruciform building where each end pointing towards a central point. It is one of the few examples of colonial architecture in the form of a cross in Venezuela.

Casa del Tesoro

Mansion built in 1770 by the Talavera family, and on this was born Bishop Mariano de Talavera, which famous corian that supported the cause of independence. The origin of its name is from the legend that in its land would be buried a treasure that has not yet been located.

Alberto Henríquez Museum of Art

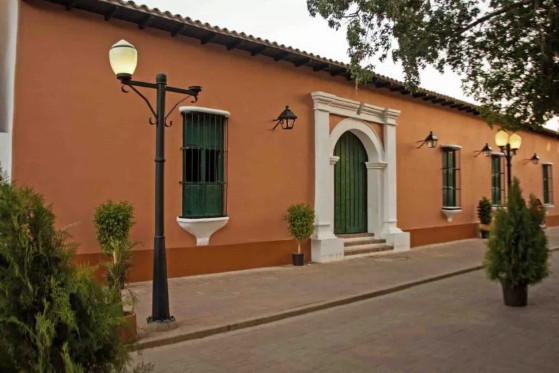
Alberto Henríquez Museum of Art

The house built was built in the first half of the XVIII century by the lieutenant governor of Coro Don Francisco Campuzano Polanco as his residence and bought on 1847 by Mr. David Abraham Senior, a sephardic trader from Curaçao who built there the Coro Synagogue, one of the oldest synagogues in Latin America. Currently, the synagogue is part of the Alberto Henríquez Museum of Art, which belongs to Universidad Francisco de Miranda.

Balcón de los Arcaya

Great two-story building and topped with a wooden balcony on the second floor. It was built in the 18th century as residence to the Colina Peredo family and takes its name from the family that occupied it since the mid-19th century and which was donated to the nation. It houses the People Earthenware Museum.

Balcón de Bolívar

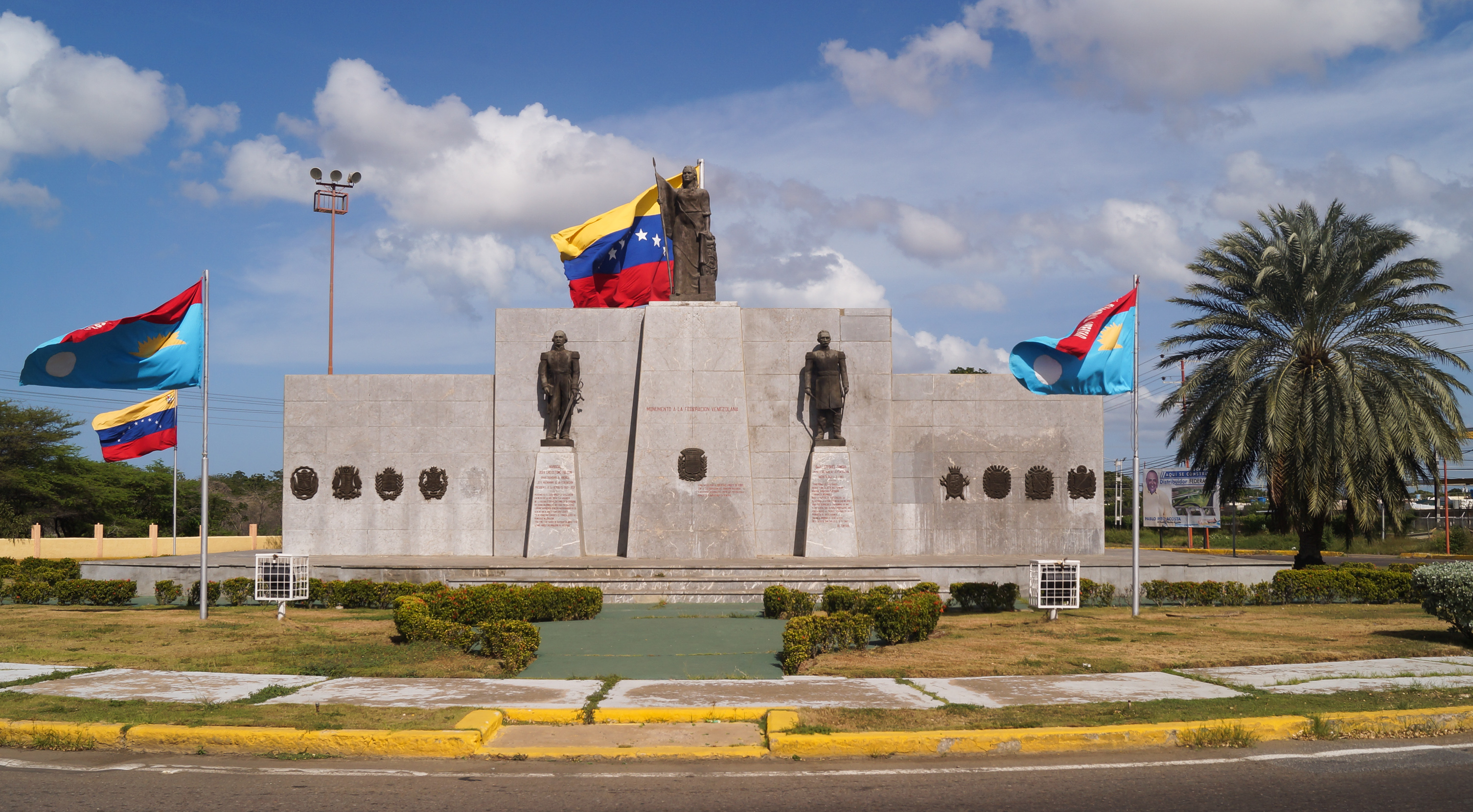
Monument to the Venezuelan Federation.

Also known as Balcón de los Senior. It served as military headquarters of the patriot forces during the War of Independence. It is said that the Liberator Simón Bolívar stayed there on December 23, 1826, and from the balcony greeted the patriots who gathered outside to greet him. It houses the Coro Art Museum.

Cruz de San Clemente

It is said that St. Clement's Cross marks the spot where the first mass officiate at South America. It is sheltered by a pavilion erected ordered the Marshal Juan Crisóstomo Falcón during his presidential tenure.

Jewish cemetery of Coro

It is the oldest Jewish cemetery in South America. Its origin goes back to the 19th century when the Sephardic Jewish colony of the Dutch island of Curaçao began migrating to the city in 1824. This cemetery is beginning to build in 1832 by Joseph Curiel, who buy land in the vicinity of the town to bury his baby daughter Hana. On this are wonderful mausoleums that reflect the spirit of ancient times.

Iglesia del Carrizal

In this sanctuary is the image of the Virgin of Guadalupe of Carrizal, which according to legend, was rescued in 1723, by Native Americans of the region, of the corian beaches when a vessel sank near the coast of the people. The Natives were shocked to see the perfection of its forms.

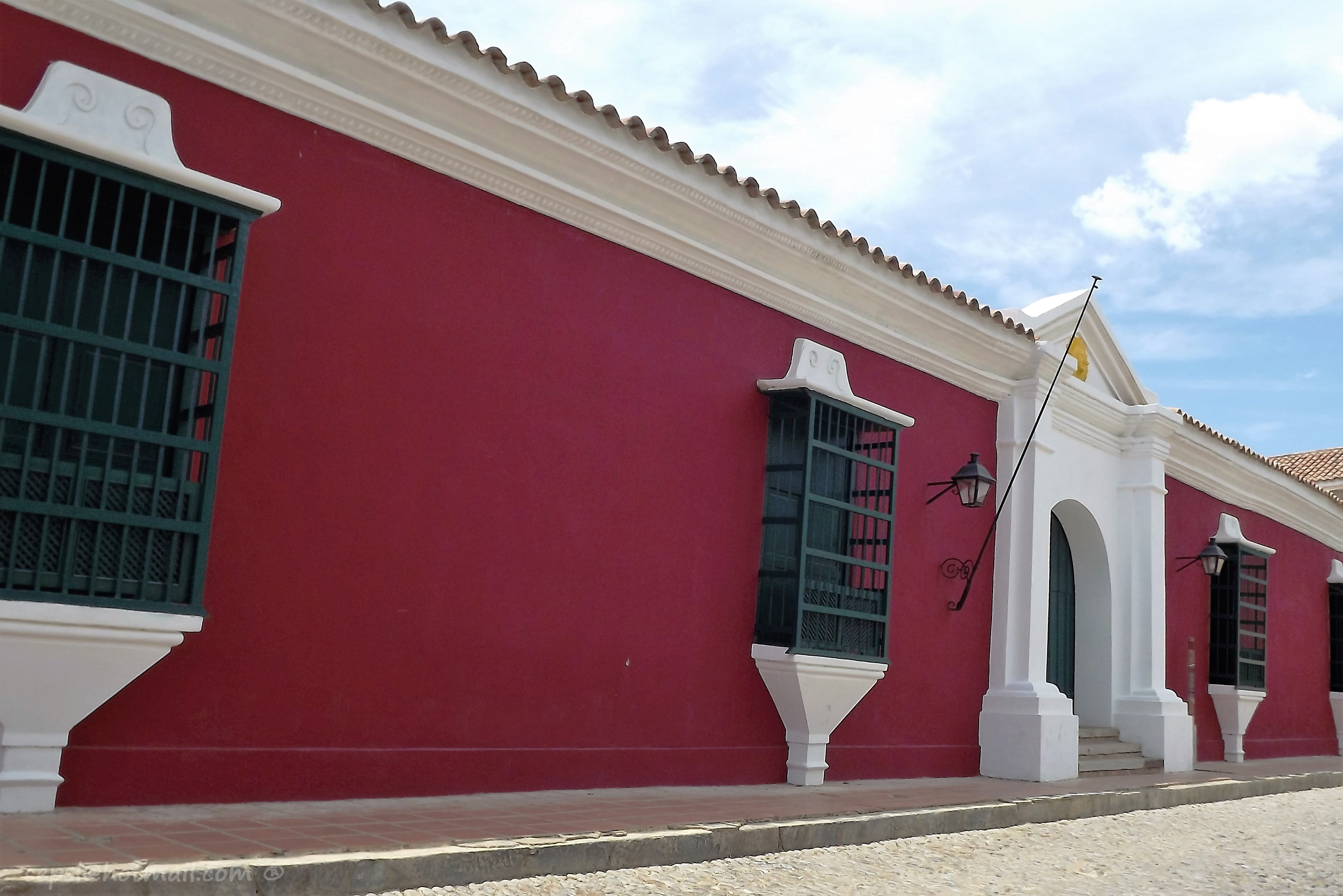
La Casa del Sol, en la Calle Federación

Casa del Sol

It is one of Venezuela's oldest houses, its construction dates from the 17th century. Its name comes from the sun located above its door, symbolizing God.

Iglesia San Nicolás de Bari

Which would be located outside the city for a long period. It is located west of the historic centre and was built in 1741, for a lady of the Spanish elite, which, according to a promise, she vowed to build a temple on behalf of Saint Nicholas of Bari.

Arco de la Federación

It is the monument to Marshal Juan Crisóstomo Falcón, a Corian leader during the Federal War and was also President of the Republic from 1863 to 1868.

Church of San Gabriel
House Gumersindo Torres
Plaza Manaure
Xerophytic Garden Dr. Leon Croizat

== Surrounding area ==
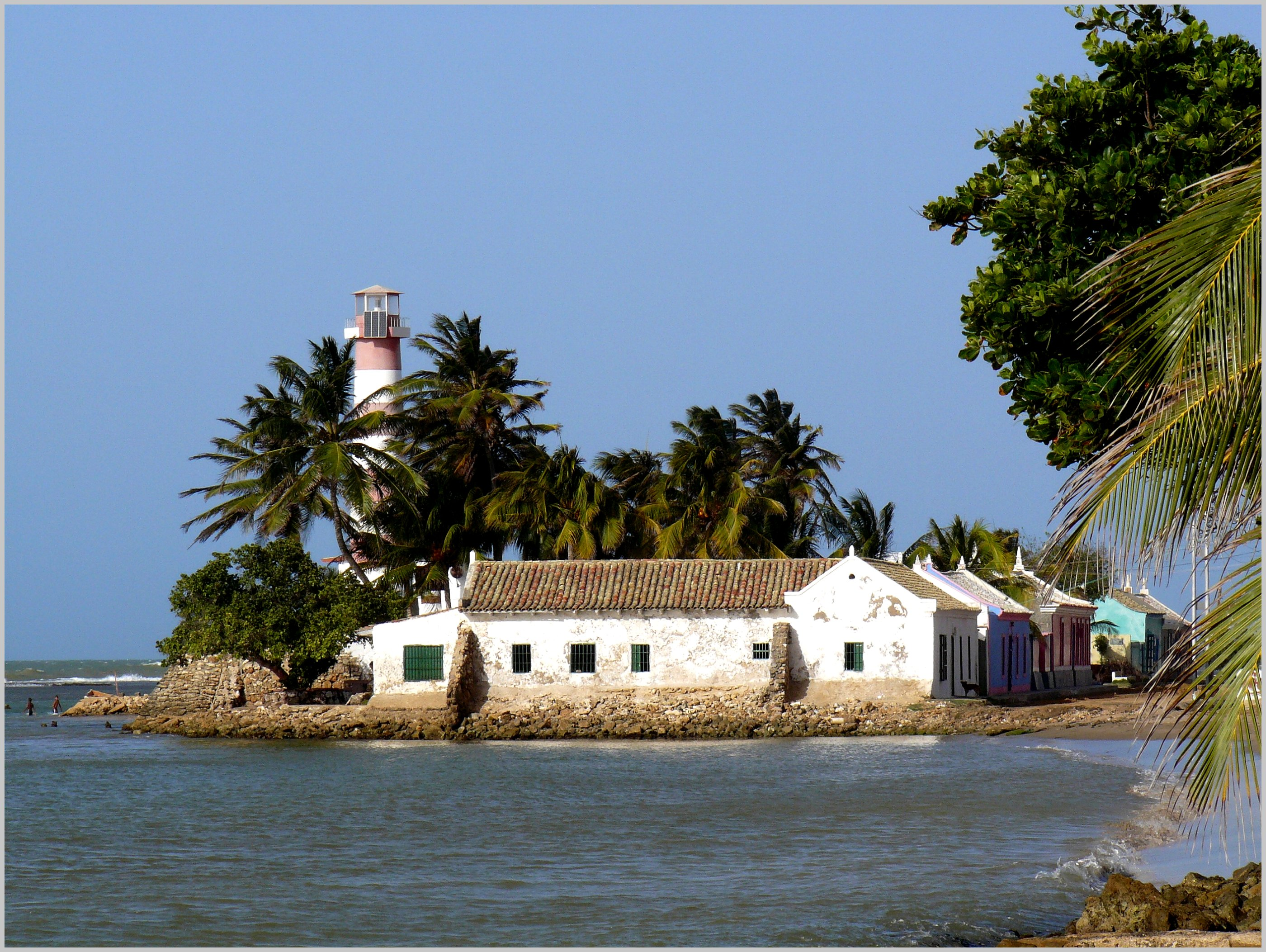
Adícora town in the Paraguaná Peninsula

Traveling one hour north, the tourist will find world-famous beaches for windsurfing in the Paraguaná Peninsula. One hour south, "La Sierra de Coro" presents small towns with a more temperate climate and views of the city. On clear days, visitors will be able to see the médanos (dunes) and behind them the Paraguaná Peninsula with its Cerro Santa Ana. Driving west, tourists can also visit Urumaco, an important fossil site. The Sierra de San Luis National Park is 30 kilometres (19 mi) to the south, with a number of attractions including birdwatching and nature observation; Cerro Galicia, the highest hill in the district; the Hueque resurgence cave and associated waterfalls; the Acarite river cave; and the 305 metres (1,001 ft) deep Haitón del Guarataro, the deepest limestone cave in Venezuela.

== Economy ==
The economy in Coro is highly dependent on state government expenditure. Retail commercial activity, civil construction, tourism and professional services are the principal activities of the city economy.

== See also ==
- La Vela de Coro
- German colonisation of the Americas
- World Heritage Sites in Danger
