= Juan Crisóstomo Falcón National Park =

National park in Venezuela

Juan Crisóstomo Falcón
- la Sierra de San Luis
- IUCN category II (national park)
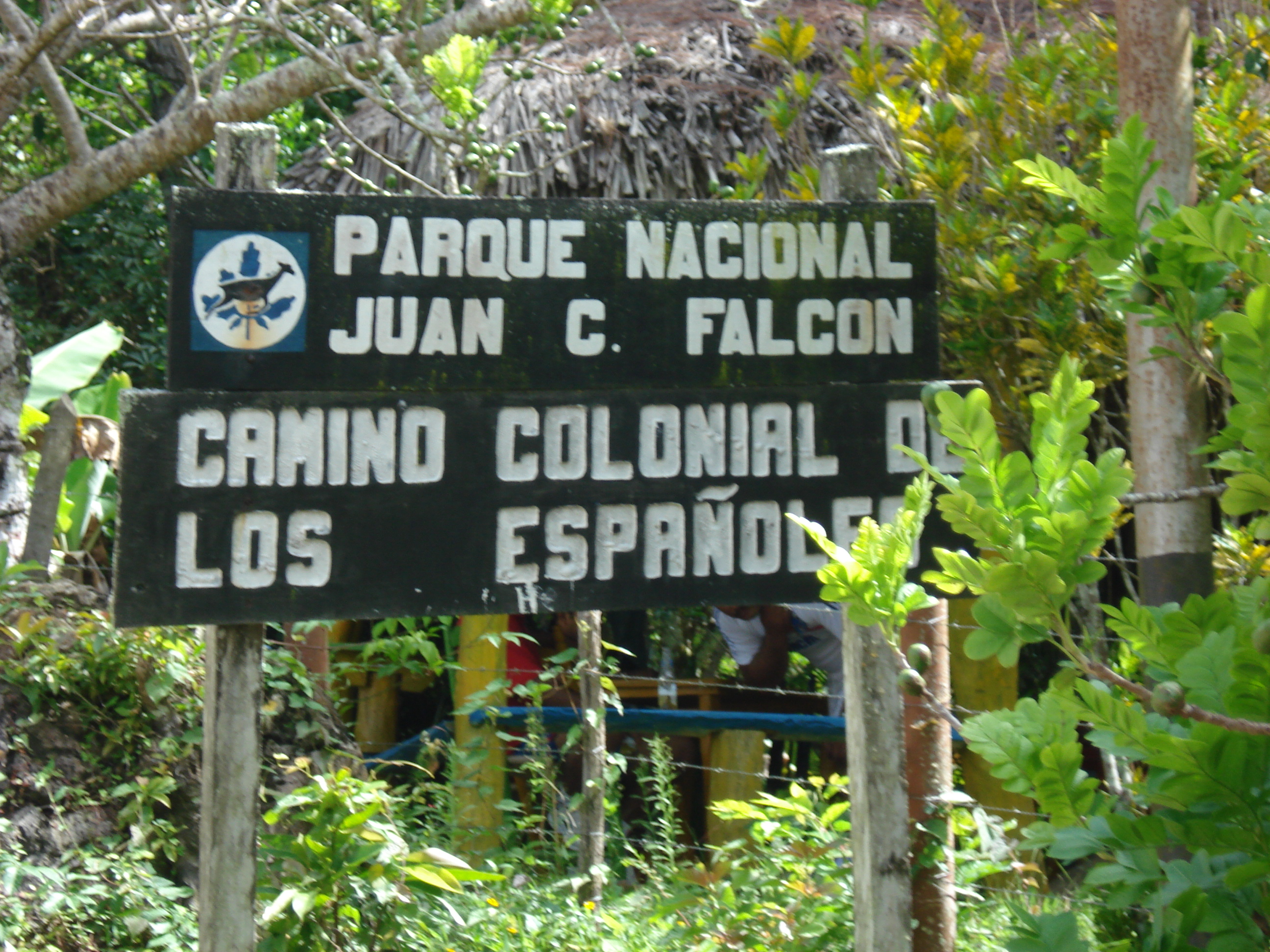
- National Park Sign for the Spanish Way

- Location within Venezuela
- Nearest city: Coro
- Coordinates: 11.149858°N 69.689882°W
- Area: 20,000 hectares (49,000 acres)
- Established: May 6, 1987
- Governing body: INPARQUES
- Website: diversidadbiologica.info.ve/diversidadbiologica.php?seccion=2&target=detailed&category=05-PNOO&subcategory=PNOO0022

The Juan Crisostomo Falcón National Park (Spanish: Parque nacional Juan Crisóstomo Falcón), also known as the Sierra de San Luis, is in the southern part of the Falcón state in Venezuela. It has an area of 20,000 hectares (49,000 acres) covering the municipalities of Bolívar, Petit, and part of the municipalities of Colina and Miranda. It was created in 1987.

== National park ==
The topography of the park is mountainous, with the highest point being Cerro Galicia at 1,600 metres (5,200 ft). It features rich ecosystems ranging from rain cloud forest to savannah. Much of it is covered with karst landscape with many caves and shafts, and the springs welling out from the flanks of the sierra provide water for Coro, Punto Fijo and Cumarebo, particularly the Paraguaná Peninsula and its oil refining industry.

It is a tourist destination, with the main attractions including birdwatching and nature observation; Cerro Galicia, the highest hill in the district; the Hueque resurgence cave and associated waterfalls; the Acarite river cave; the 305 metres (1,001 ft) deep Haitón del Guarataro, the deepest limestone cave in Venezuela; and the Spanish Way, a road built in colonial times.

== See also ==
- List of national parks of Venezuela
