= Cathedral of Coro =

Coordinates: 11.40736°N 69.67777°W

Cathedral Basilica of St. Anne
- Catedral Basílica Menor de Santa Ana de Coro
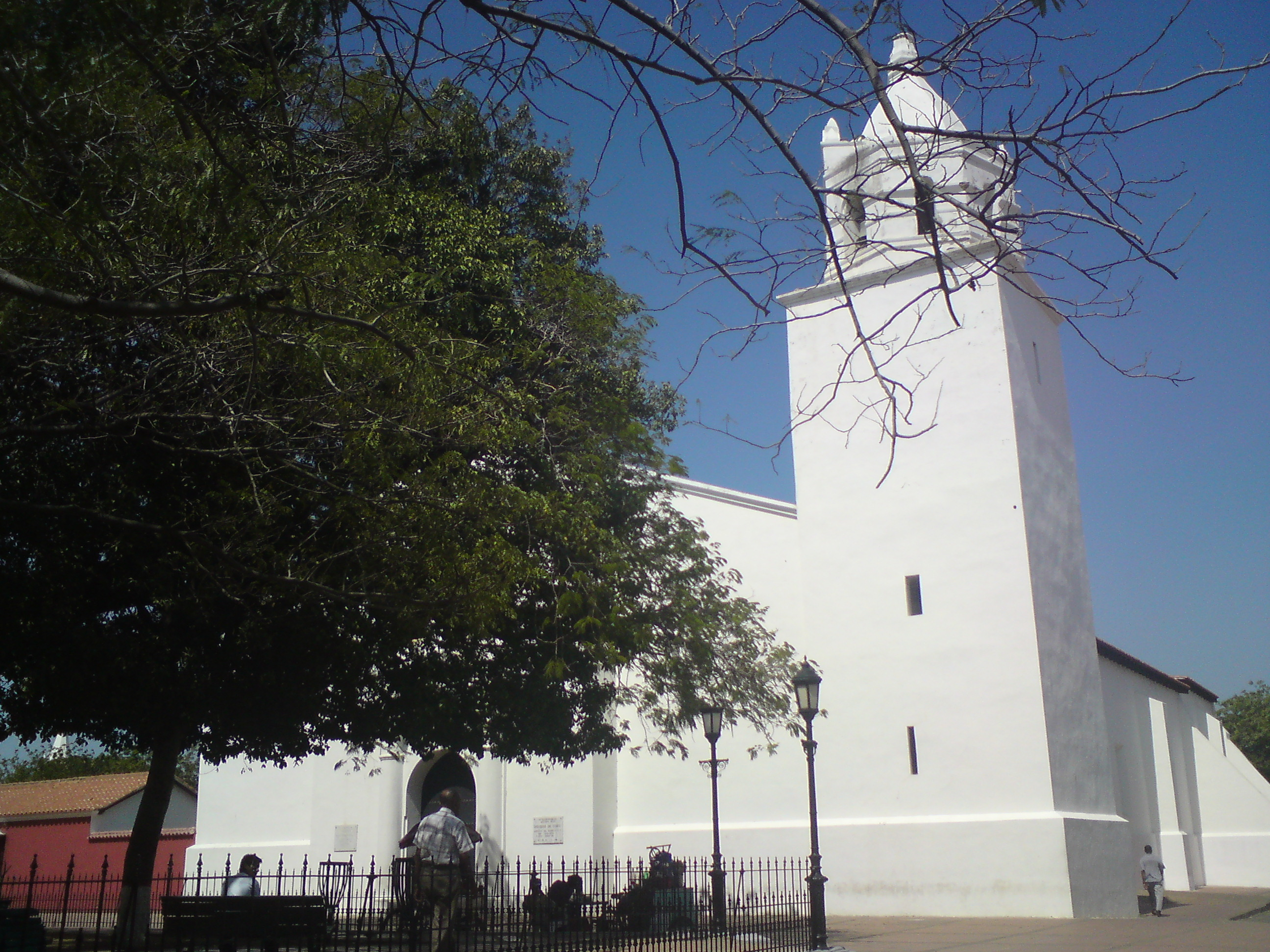
- Cathedral Basilica of St. Anne
- Location: Coro
- Country: Venezuela
- Denomination: Roman Catholic Church

The Cathedral Basilica of St. Anne (Spanish: Catedral Basílica Menor de Santa Ana de Coro) is a cathedral and basilica located in Coro, Venezuela.

Pope Clement VII created the Diocese of Coro in 1531. Construction of the cathedral began in 1583; it is not known who designed the plan with its nave and 2 aisles (3 naves in Spanish terminology).

The tower of the cathedral was built after 1620, and it is believed that the construction work was completed in 1634, almost 50 years after the decision had been made to start the work. It is known that between 1608 and 1615, Francisco Ramírez participated in the construction of the dome and two lateral vaults. Nevada Bartolomé took over the work in 1615 and his role was essential in the continuity of the work and outcome of its construction.

The cathedral was among all buildings built before 1713 the most important as it would set a precedent in the architectural features for the construction of the churches of the rest of the country.

== Conservation ==
Coro and the nearby town of La Vela de Coro were designated a World Heritage Site ("Coro and its port La Vela") in the 1990s because of their architectural heritage. The cathedral has been included in a buffer zone, rather than the core area of the site.

In 2005 Coro was included in the List of World Heritage in Danger following damage caused to the city by heavy rains. In 2018 corrective measures were still being addressed, although some progress had been made.

== See also ==
- List of cathedrals in Venezuela
- Catholic Church in Venezuela
