= Coro Synagogue =

Former synagogue, now museum, in Falcón, Venezuela

- (Spanish: Casa de Oración Hebrea)
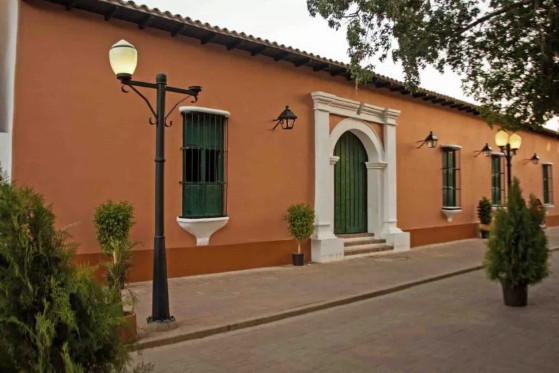
- The former synagogue, now Alberto Henríquez Museum of Art, in 2018

- Location of the former synagogue, now museum, in Venezuela

Religion
- Affiliation: Judaism (former)
- Ecclesiastical or organisational status: Synagogue (1847–1880s); Museum (since 1997)
- Status: Inactive (as a synagogue); Repurposed

Location
- Location: Talavera Street, Santa Ana de Coro, Falcón
- Country: Venezuela
- Coordinates: 11°24′28″N 69°40′35″W

Architecture
- Type: House
- Style: Spanish Colonial
- Completed: 1774 (as a house); 1847 (as a synagogue)

The Coro Synagogue (Spanish: Casa de Oración Hebrea), is a former Jewish synagogue, now museum, located on Talavera Street, in the city of Santa Ana de Coro, Falcón, Venezuela, a city located near the Caribbean Sea coast and the Dutch island of Curaçao. It was one of the oldest synagogues in Latin America.

== History ==
The former synagogue on Talavera Street was originally built as a house in the first half of the 18th century by the lieutenant governor of Coro Don Francisco Campuzano Polanco as his residence. The house was purchased on July 30, 1847 by David Abraham Senior, a Sephardic trader from Curaçao. Senior lived in the city and formed part of the city's growing Jewish community. Prior to Senior's purchase of the Talavera Street house, the community used to gather at the house of David Valencia to pray. It is known that approximately 20 people gathered there for shabbat and daily prayer services. Senior's son, Isaac, and his descendants continued living in the Talavera Street house and using one of its rooms as a prayer hall, until the 1880s.

=== Acquisition by the Venezuelan Government ===
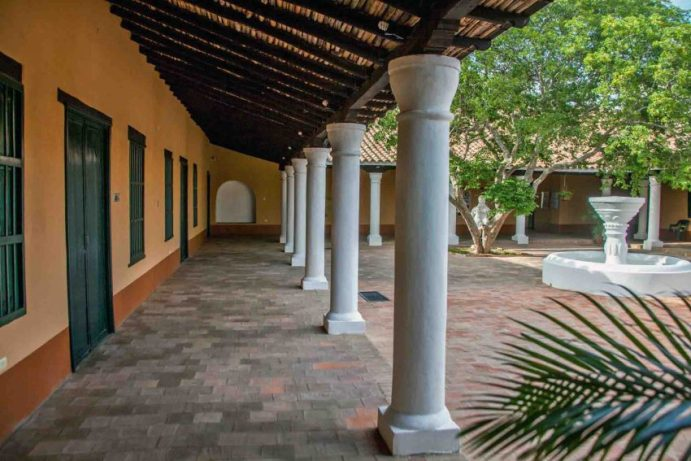
Veranda of the former house of Don Francisco Campuzano Polanco

On February 6, 1986, the house was bought by the Government of Venezuela, and on August 3, 1997, the government of Falcón State reopened the house under the name of "Casa de Oración Hebrea" (Hebrew Prayer House) as an important cultural contribution that forms part of the Sephardic heritage in northern Venezuela region. The former synagogue on Talavera Street, is located in the city's old quarter. Its floor was covered in the sand of the Médanos de Coro, in the same fashion as the sea sand that covers the floor of Mikvé Israel-Emanuel Synagogue in Willemstad, Curaçao, from where the community arrived from more than two centuries ago.

The former synagogue is part of the Alberto Henríquez Museum of Art, which belongs to Universidad Francisco de Miranda. In 2009, the university contacted the Israelite Association of Venezuela to seek support for the restoration and maintenance of the former synagogue.

== See also ==
- History of the Jews in Venezuela
- List of synagogues in Venezuela
