= Rhinella sclerocephala =

Conservation status
- Vulnerable (IUCN 3.1)

Scientific classification
- Kingdom: Animalia
- Phylum: Chordata
- Class: Amphibia
- Order: Anura
- Family: Bufonidae
- Genus: Rhinella
- Species: R. sclerocephala

Binomial name
- Rhinella sclerocephala (Mijares-Urrutia and Arends-R., 2001)

Synonyms
- Bufo sclerocephalus Mijares-Urrutia and Arends-R., 2001

Species of amphibian

Rhinella sclerocephala is a species of toad in the family Bufonidae. It is endemic to the Sierra de San Luis in the Falcón state, Venezuela. Its natural habitats are cloud forests at elevations of 1,150–1,500 m (3,770–4,920 ft) asl. Its habitat is under strong pressure from agriculture and livestock farming, even within the Juan Crisóstomo Falcón National Park.
