= Sierra de Falcón =

Mountain range in Venezuela

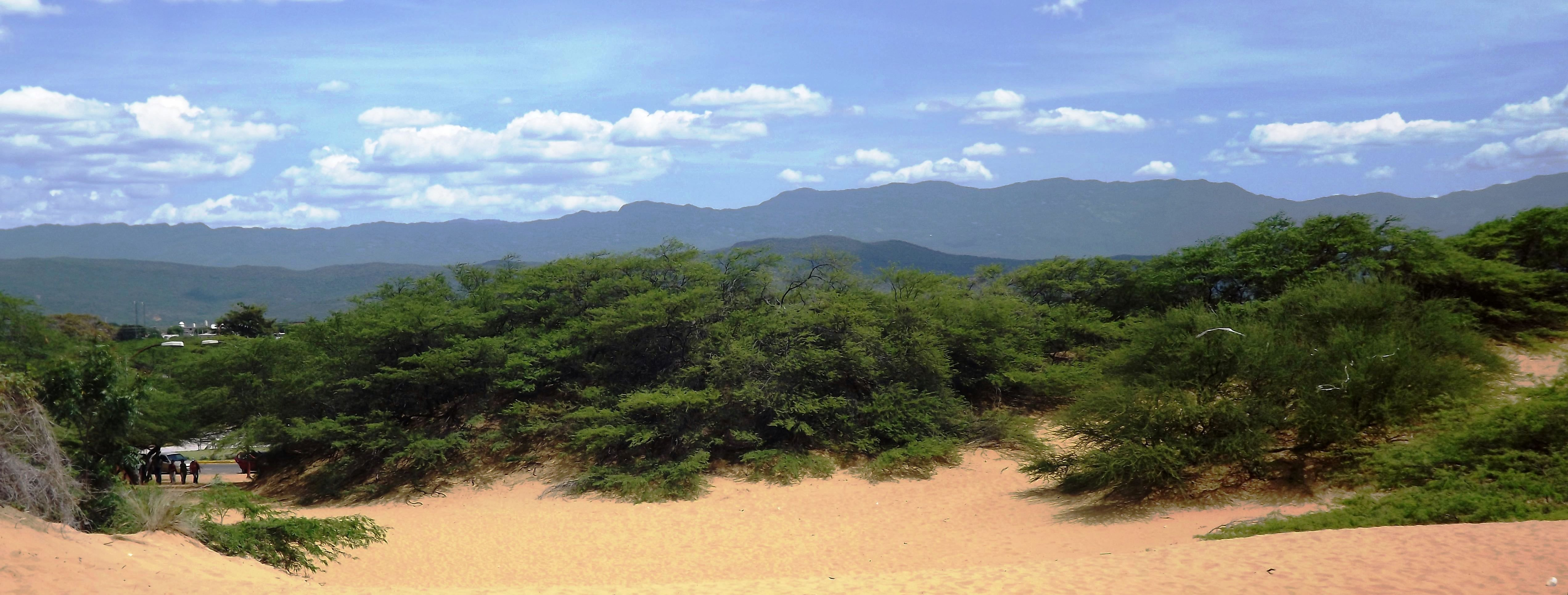

The Sierra de Falcón consists of a series of mountains located in Venezuela's Falcón State of relatively low altitude, mostly formed by the Sierra de San Luis and the Sierra de Churuguara. They have an east–west orientation and are part of the Coriano System. The Sierra de San Luis has been made into a National Park - the Juan Crisóstomo Falcón National Park.

== Borders ==
The natural border in the North is partly the Médanos Isthmus; in the south the Tocuyo River.

== Municipalities ==
Mainly

- Bolívar
- Petit Municipality
- Federación Municipality
- Unión Municipality
- Sucre Municipality

and the south of :

- Miranda Municipality
- Colina Municipality

It has a surface of 4.219 km² and ca 40.000 inhabitants.
