= Haitón del Guarataro =

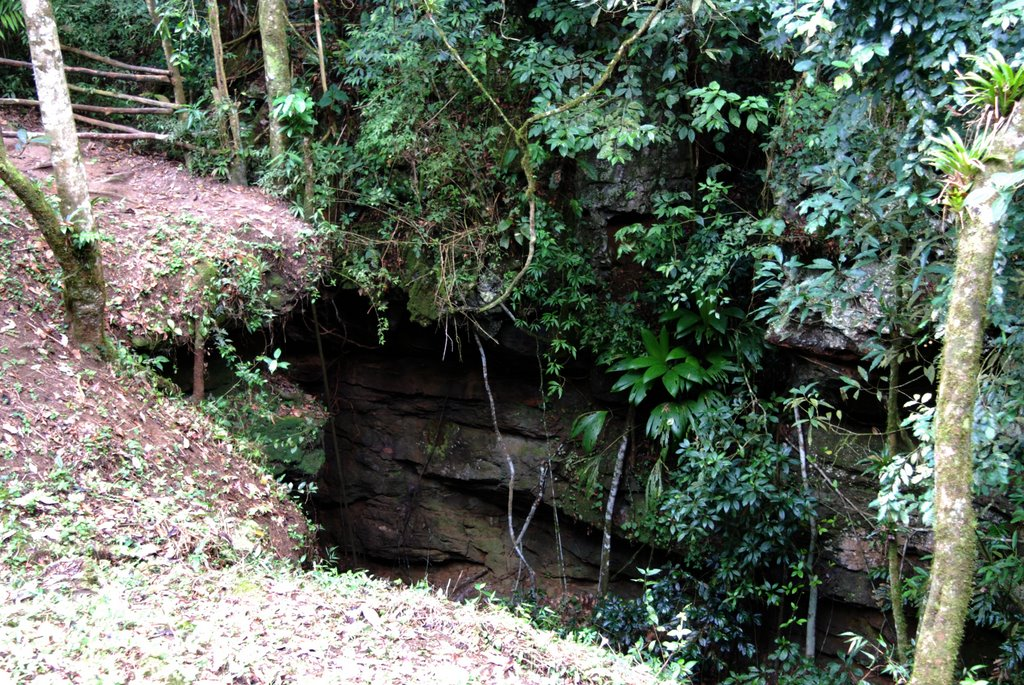
- Entrance shaft of Haitón del Guarataro

- Location within Venezuela
- Location: Falcón State, Venezuela
- Coordinates: 11°08′59″N 69°41′23″W
- Depth: 305 metres (1,001 ft)
- Length: 640 metres (2,100 ft)
- Elevation: 1,000 metres (3,300 ft)
- Discovery: April 1973
- Geology: Oligocene limestone
- Entrances: 1
- Hazards: Verticality
- Cave survey: BKRE 1973

The Haitón del Guarataro is a solutional cave system in the Sierra de San Luis in Falcón State, Venezuela, 2.5 kilometres (1.6 mi) south-east of Curimagua. It is the deepest limestone cave in Venezuela, and the entrance is a tourist attraction within the Juan Crisóstomo Falcón National Park. A large entrance shaft 12 metres (39 ft) in diameter leads via drops of 168 metres (551 ft), 55 metres (180 ft), and 19 metres (62 ft) to a stream passage which follows the dip down for a distance of about 350 metres (1,150 ft) to the north to where it eventually chokes. An upstream passage is intercepted which runs south for about 150 metres (490 ft) to the base of a shaft. The cave has a depth of 305 metres (1,001 ft), and a total passage length of 640 metres (2,100 ft). It was first explored and surveyed in April 1973 by members of the Venezuela '73 British Karst Research Expedition. It is formed in Oligocene reefal limestone.

A faunal survey was undertaken during the exploration of the cave, but only a few cavernicoles were recorded. They included cave crickets, phalangodid harvestmen, a depigmented troglophile garnmarid shrimp (Hyalella meinerti) found in a large pool, and a troglobitic trichopolydesmid millipede found on the roof of the terminal chamber.
