= Marisora falconensis =

Conservation status
- Least Concern (IUCN 3.1)

Scientific classification
- Kingdom: Animalia
- Phylum: Chordata
- Class: Reptilia
- Order: Squamata
- Suborder: Scinciformata
- Infraorder: Scincomorpha
- Family: Mabuyidae
- Genus: Marisora
- Species: M. falconensis

Binomial name
- Marisora falconensis (Mijares-Urrutia & Arends, 1997)

Species of lizard

Marisora falconensis is a species of skink found in Venezuela and Colombia.
