= Atractus mijaresi =

Conservation status
- Data Deficient (IUCN 3.1)

Scientific classification
- Kingdom: Animalia
- Phylum: Chordata
- Class: Reptilia
- Order: Squamata
- Suborder: Serpentes
- Family: Colubridae
- Genus: Atractus
- Species: A. mijaresi

Binomial name
- Atractus mijaresi Esqueda & La Marca, 2005

Species of snake

Atractus mijaresi is a species of snake in the subfamily Dipsadinae of the family Colubridae. The species is endemic to Venezuela.

== Etymology ==
The specific name, mijaresi, is in honor of Venezuelan herpetologist Abraham Mijares-Urrutia.

== Taxonomy ==
Atractus mijaresi was described in 2005 as a species new to science by Esqueda and La Marca. In 2024 Passos et al. considered it to be a junior synonym of Atractus pamplonensis, which had been described by Amaral in 1935.
