= Adícora =

- Coordinates: 11°56′N 69°48′W
- Country: Venezuela

Adícora is a village in the Falcón Municipality, a region of Venezuela. It is located on the Paraguaná Peninsula, approximately 24 kilometers south of the island of Aruba.

== History ==
Originally, Adícora was a port, founded by Spanish Conquistadors in the 16th century. Even now, albeit to a lesser extent, trade flows between the settlement and nearby places in the Caribbean, such as the ABC islands to the north. However, Adícora is now mostly a tourist hub for sports, with some recreational activities.

== Tourism ==
Adícora is a desirable location for tourists partly due to its perceived safety and undisturbed nature, compared to other places in Venezuela like Caracas. Local restaurants, and an active water sports community, bring in many local and international visitors every year. Travel to the town and Venezuela as a whole have decreased in recent years, as a result of political instability and travel restrictions to and from Venezuela. Several inns are located inside Adícora, which host a couple restaurants.

== Sports and culture ==
Adícora is known for its desirable location and windy climate for kiteboarders and windsurfers. Other nearby settlements like Matagorda host similar activities. Owing to its proximity to the water and naval trade in the Caribbean, seafood is a major part of the local diet.

== Climate ==
The climate of Adícora is windy and tropical. In 2023, the lowest temperature of the year in Adícora was 77 °F, recorded in January. Meanwhile, in September, it reached a high that year of 104 °F. Adícora is relatively close to the Equator.

== Gallery ==
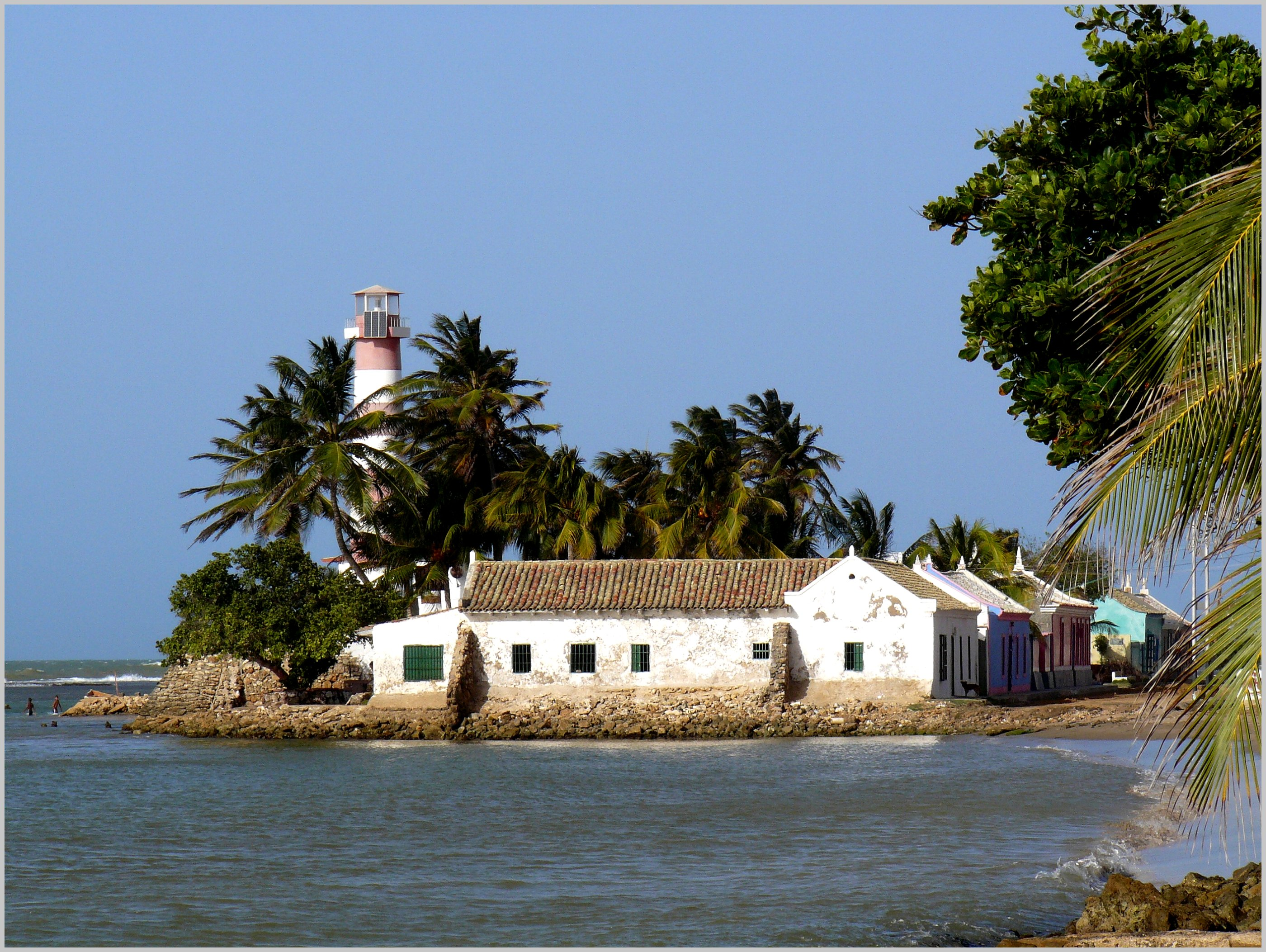
Lighthouse and houses of Adícora.

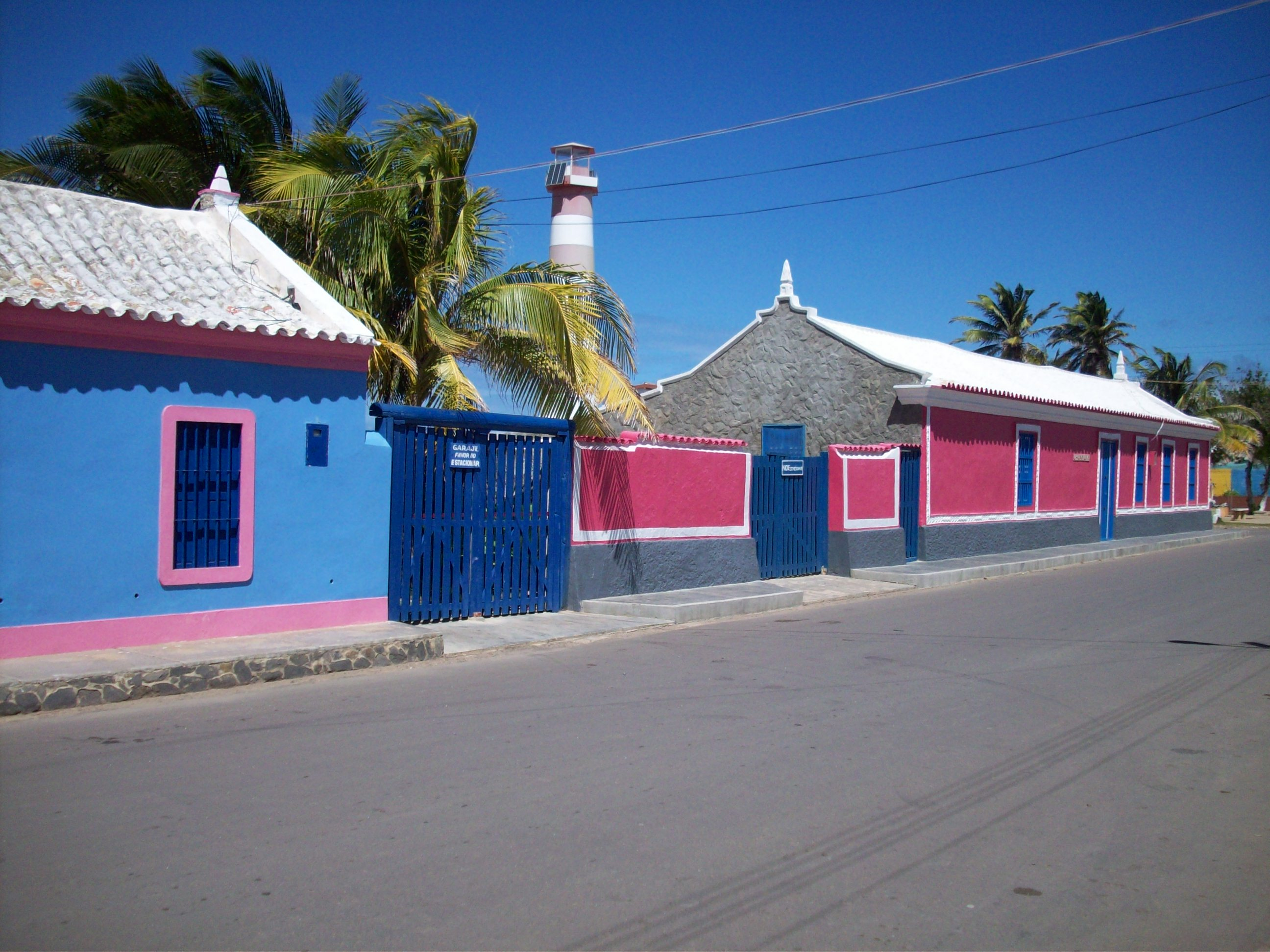
Houses of Adícora.
