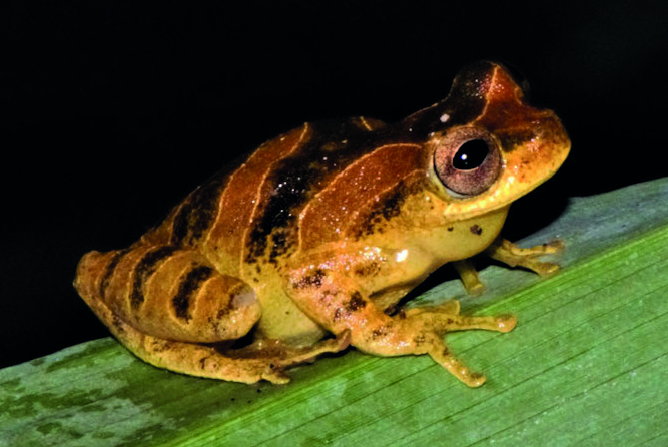
- Amapá, Brazil

Conservation status
- Critically Endangered (IUCN 3.1)

Scientific classification
- Kingdom: Animalia
- Phylum: Chordata
- Class: Amphibia
- Order: Anura
- Family: Hylidae
- Genus: Dendropsophus
- Species: D. amicorum

Binomial name
- Dendropsophus amicorum (Mijares-Urrutia, 1998)

= Dendropsophus amicorum =

Species of amphibian

Dendropsophus amicorum, the Socopo tree frog, is a species of frogs in the family Hylidae.

It is found in Brazil and Venezuela. Its natural habitat is subtropical or tropical moist montane forests. It is threatened by habitat loss.
