= La Vela de Coro =

Venezuelan port

Coordinates: 11°28′N 69°34′W

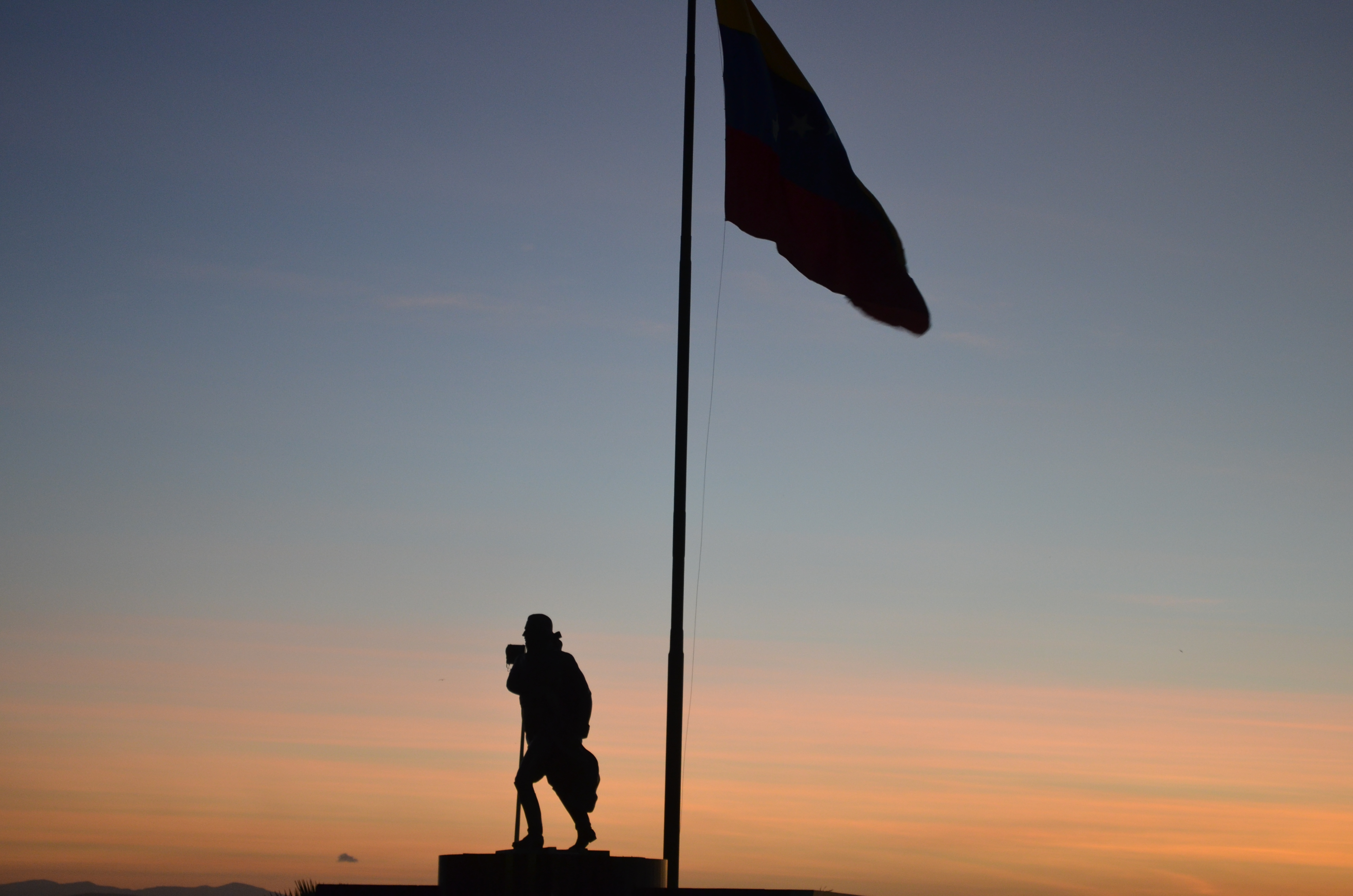
Statue of Francisco de Miranda

La Vela de Coro is the port of Coro, Venezuela. Coro and its port form a conurbation, although Coro is in the municipality of Miranda and La Vela is in a separate municipality, Colina. The twin settlements were founded by the Spanish in the 16th century.

Like Coro, La Vela is notable for its architecture. In 1993 a World Heritage Site was designated to protect historic districts of both settlements. Because of its proximity to the Dutch Caribbean, the local architecture reflects Dutch influences as well as the Spanish Colonial inheritance which is typical of Venezuela.

== History ==
During the reign of Charles V, Coro became the first German colony in the Americas. In 1528 Charles V, who was in debt to German bankers, gave a charter to the Welsers, a banking family from Augsburg, to exploit the territory known as the Venezuela Province. Bartholomeus VI. Welser was beheaded in 1546 and the charter was revoked.

=== La Vela and the Venezuelan flag ===
La Vela played an important role in the history of the Flag of Venezuela. The first version of this tricolour flag was unfurled on Venezuelan soil at La Vela when Francisco de Miranda landed there in August 1806. Miranda was seeking independence from Spain for its American colonies. He and his troops marched on and captured Coro, but found no support from the city residents. Having only a couple of hundred soldiers, Miranda had to withdraw when the Spanish began moving their forces to confront him. Miranda sailed to Trinidad, then a British colony, where his corvette the "Leander" was auctioned to meet some of the costs of the expedition.

While the expedition was a failure in military terms, it is celebrated in connection with the flag. Previously, in Venezuela "Flag Day" was celebrated on March 12 marking the flag's unfurling in Haiti (when Miranda was on his way to Venezuela). In 2006, it was designated August 3 in honor of the disembarkation of Miranda in La Vela de Coro in 1806. A walkway, the Paseo "Generalísimo Francisco de Miranda", was constructed to mark the 200th anniversary of Miranda's landing.

== World Heritage Site ==
The two urban areas of "Coro and its port" cover a total of 18.40 ha; 7.85 ha in Coro, and 10.55 ha in the Port of La Vela. As at 2019 the boundaries of the buffer zones are under discussion.

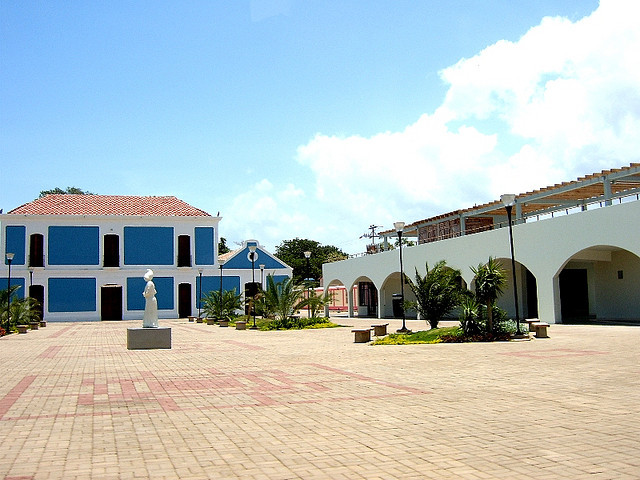
Antigua Aduana (painted blue) and the Plaza La Antillana

Buildings of interest in La Vela include:

- the old aduana (customs house)
- the Basílica de Nuestra Señora de Guadalupe (Coro))

=== Threats to the site ===
The buildings of La Vela include examples of traditional mud building techniques, a type of construction which often poses conservation problems, because of, for example, its vulnerability to water damage and other natural impacts. The climate in this region of Venezuela is classed as semi-arid, but the site was damaged by heavy rain in 2004/2005. There were also concerns about the site being affected by inappropriate development. These factors resulted in its inclusion on the list of World Heritage in Danger in 2005. As at 2019 it is still on the list, although UNESCO has acknowledged progress with corrective measures. Among other recommendations, UNESCO has requested implementing a comprehensive drainage plan. Also, modifications to the buffer zone at La Vela have been proposed. These would reduce the overall area protected, but would include a coastal walk to protect the visual relationship of the property with the coastline.
