= Francisco de Miranda National Experimental University =

University in Falcón, Venezuela

- Universidad Nacional Experimental Francisco de Miranda
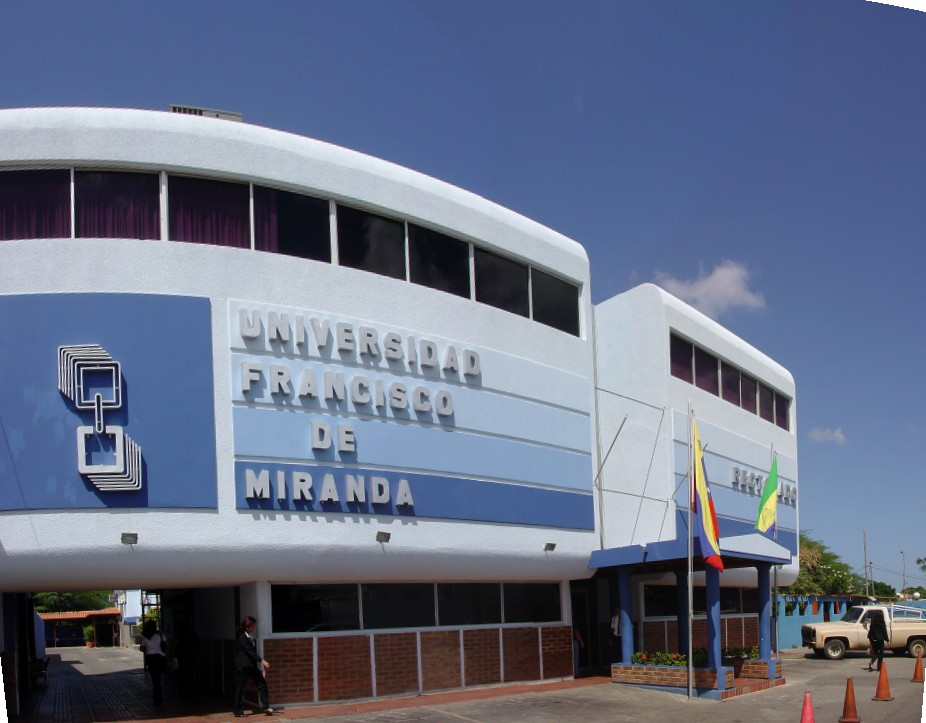
- Motto: La Universidad para el Desarrollo Integral del Estado Falcón
- Motto in English: The University for the Internal Development of Falcón State
- Type: Public University
- Established: July 25, 1977
- Founders: Carlos Andrés Pérez
- Affiliations: Ministry of Popular Power for University Education, Science, Technology (MPPEUCT), body of the Executive Branch
- Rector: Rector: María Elvia Gómez; Academic Vice-Rector: Jean Carlos Yépez; Administrative Vice-Rector: Julio Camacaro; General Secretary: Vicente Duran
- Students: 32000
- Location: Rectorado Building, Norte Street between Av. Manaure and Toledo Street, Coro (Venezuela); 11.4124954°N 69.6949071°W
- Colors: Blue and white
- Website: unefm.edu.ve

- Location in Venezuela

The Francisco de Miranda National Experimental University (UNEFM) (Español: Universidad Nacional Experimental Francisco de Miranda) is a public institute of higher education in Venezuela, with headquarters in the state Falcón, founded in July of 1977. Today it is one of the most famous and prestigious universities in the country. It has a newspaper, a radio station (Unefm 104.1 FM) and an open television channel (TV Unefm).

7,510 professionals have graduated from UNEFM as of 2005. In additional, UNEFM has an agreement with the state business PDVSA through which graduates are given the ability start their work experience at the Amuay and Cardón refinery facilities.

The university takes it name from Francisco de Miranda, one of the main figures of the War of Venezuelan Independence.
