= Médanos de Coro National Park =

National park in Venezuela

- IUCN category II (national park)
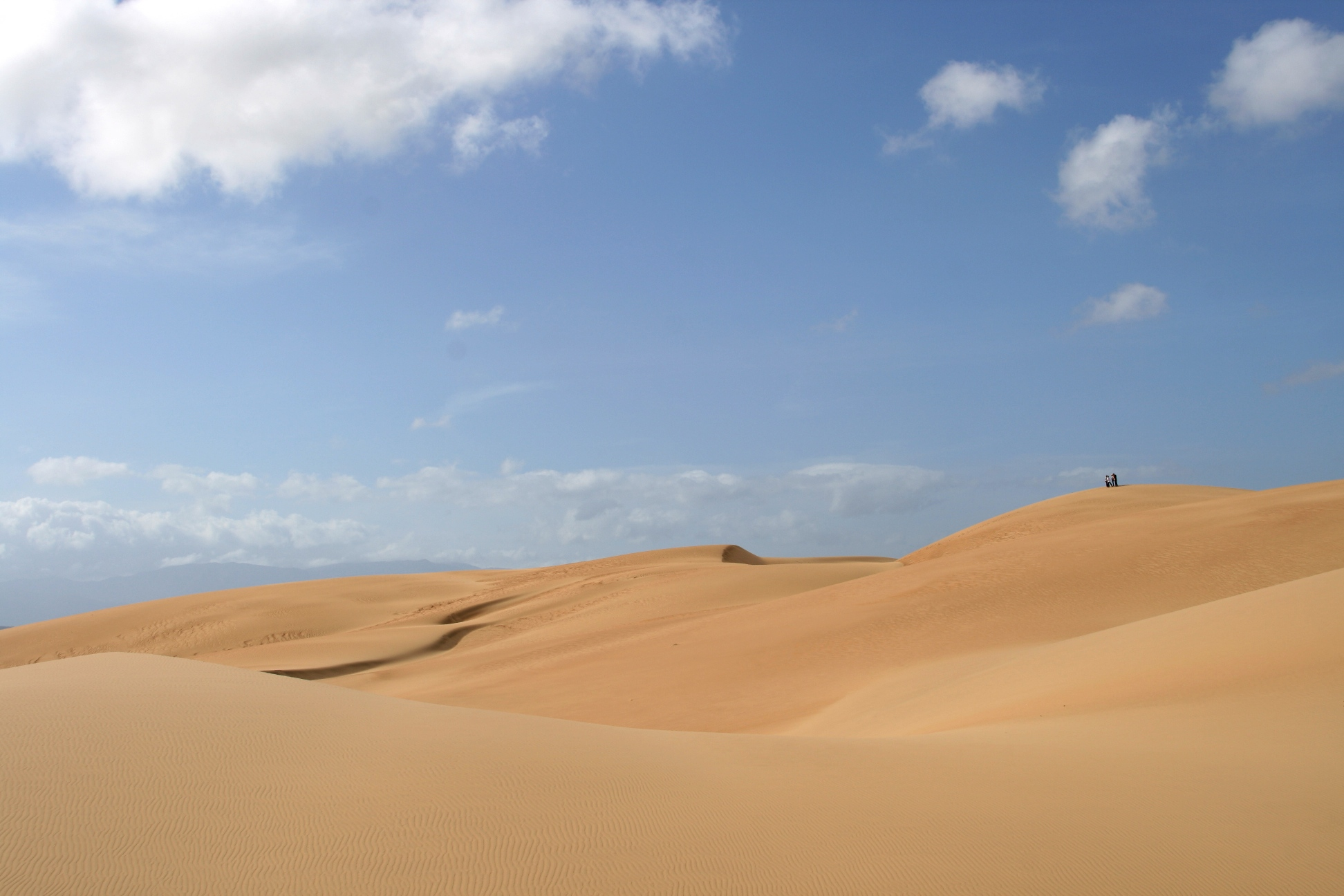
- Médanos de Coro

- Location within Venezuela
- Location: Venezuela
- Nearest city: Santa Ana de Coro
- Coordinates: 11°36′23″N 69°44′15″W
- Area: 91 km^{2} (35 sq mi)
- Established: 6 February 1974
- Governing body: Instituto Nacional de Parques (INPARQUES)

Médanos de Coro National Park (Parque Nacional Los Médanos de Coro) is a Venezuelan national park located in the state of Falcón, near the city of Coro on the road that leads to Paraguaná. The National Park was created in 1974. The park is easily reached by bus or taxi from Coro.

The Médanos park protects part of the Paraguana xeric scrub ecoregion. It lies on the Médanos Isthmus and covers 91 km^{2} (35 sq mi) of desert and coastal habitat, including salt marshes. It is made up of three zones: an alluvial plain, formed by the delta of the Mitare River and some smaller streams; an aeolian plain, composed of three types of dunes; and a littoral plain with a belt of mangrove swamps. The massive sand dunes, known as Médanos, spread over an area of approximately 5 by 30 km (3.1 by 18.6 mi). They can reach 40 m (130 ft) in height and are constantly transformed by the unrelenting wind.

Rainfall is rare. However, during the severe floods that struck Venezuela in December 1999 ("Vargas tragedy", being especially devastating in Vargas State), the heavy rain formed four lagoons in the dunes; a circumstance that the park guards had never witnessed before.

== Flora and fauna ==
Flora consists of little more than thorny shrubs. The park is an Important Bird Area with some 21 species including Yellow-shouldered amazon. Other fauna is scarce; the park is home mainly to lizards, rabbits, anteaters and foxes. Visitors can wander amongst the dunes by camel (imported many years ago).
