= Colina Municipality, Falcón =

Municipality in Falcón, Venezuela

Colina Municipality Municipio Colina
- Municipality
- Flag

- Location in Falcón

- Location in Venezuela
- Country: Venezuela
- State: Falcón
- Founded: 1993
- Municipal seat: La Vela de Coro

Government
  - Mayor: Rubén Molina Castillo (PSUV)

Area
  - Total: 563.0 km^{2} (217.4 sq mi)

Population (2017)
  - Total: 50,023
  - Density: 88.85/km^{2} (230.1/sq mi)
- Time zone: UTC−4 (VET)

Colina Municipality is located in Falcón state, Venezuela. The municipality has a total surface of 582 km^{2} and it has some 50,023 inhabitant (2017 census). Its capital is La Vela de Coro.
