= Médanos Isthmus =

Coordinates: 11°36′00″N 69°43′30″W

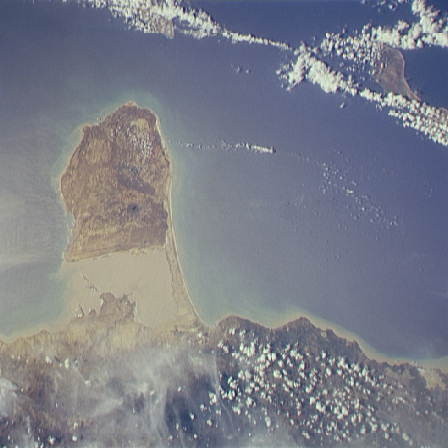
Satellite image of the Médanos isthmus and the Paraguaná Peninsula

The Médanos Isthmus is a sandy isthmus in Venezuela that connects the Paraguaná Peninsula with the rest of Falcón State. The isthmus is approximately 6 km (3.73 miles) wide and 27 km (16.78 miles) long. It is the site of the Médanos de Coro National Park.

The isthmus is in the Paraguana xeric scrub ecoregion.
