= Bolívar Municipality, Falcón =

Bolívar Municipality Municipio Bolívar
- Municipality
- Location in Miranda

- Location in Venezuela
- Coordinates: 11°03′45″N 69°37′40″W
- Country: Venezuela
- State: Miranda
- Municipal seat: San Luis[*]

Area
  - Total: 551.4 km^{2} (212.9 sq mi)
- Time zone: UTC−4 (VET)
- Website: Official website

Bolívar Municipality is a municipality in Falcón State, Venezuela.

== Name ==
The municipality is one of several in Venezuela named "Bolívar Municipality" in honour of Venezuelan independence hero Simón Bolívar.
