= Miranda Municipality, Falcón =

Miranda Municipality Municipio Miranda
- Municipality
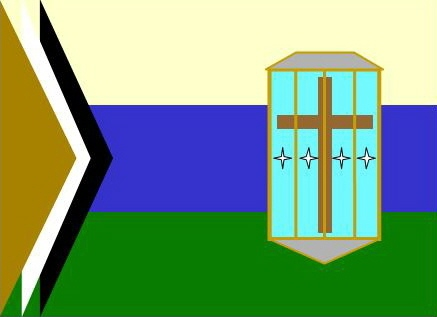
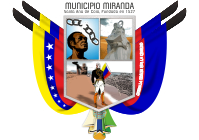
- Flag Coat of arms

- Location in Falcón

- Location in Venezuela
- Coordinates: 11°19′11″N 69°50′29″W
- Country: Venezuela
- State: Falcón
- Municipal seat: Coro

Area
  - Total: 2,215.1 km^{2} (855.3 sq mi)

Population (2011)
  - Total: 265,569
  - Density: 119.89/km^{2} (310.51/sq mi)
- Time zone: UTC−4 (VET)
- Website: Official website

Miranda is a municipality in Falcón State, Venezuela. The municipality is one of several in Venezuela named "Miranda Municipality" for independence hero Francisco de Miranda.

The main center of population is Coro, the capital of Falcón State.
