= El Palito oil spill =

El Palito oil spill can refer to two oil spills in Venezuela:

- 2020 El Palito oil spill, in July 2020
- 2023 El Palito oil spill, in December 2023
