= Caripito =

City in Monagas, Venezuela

- City
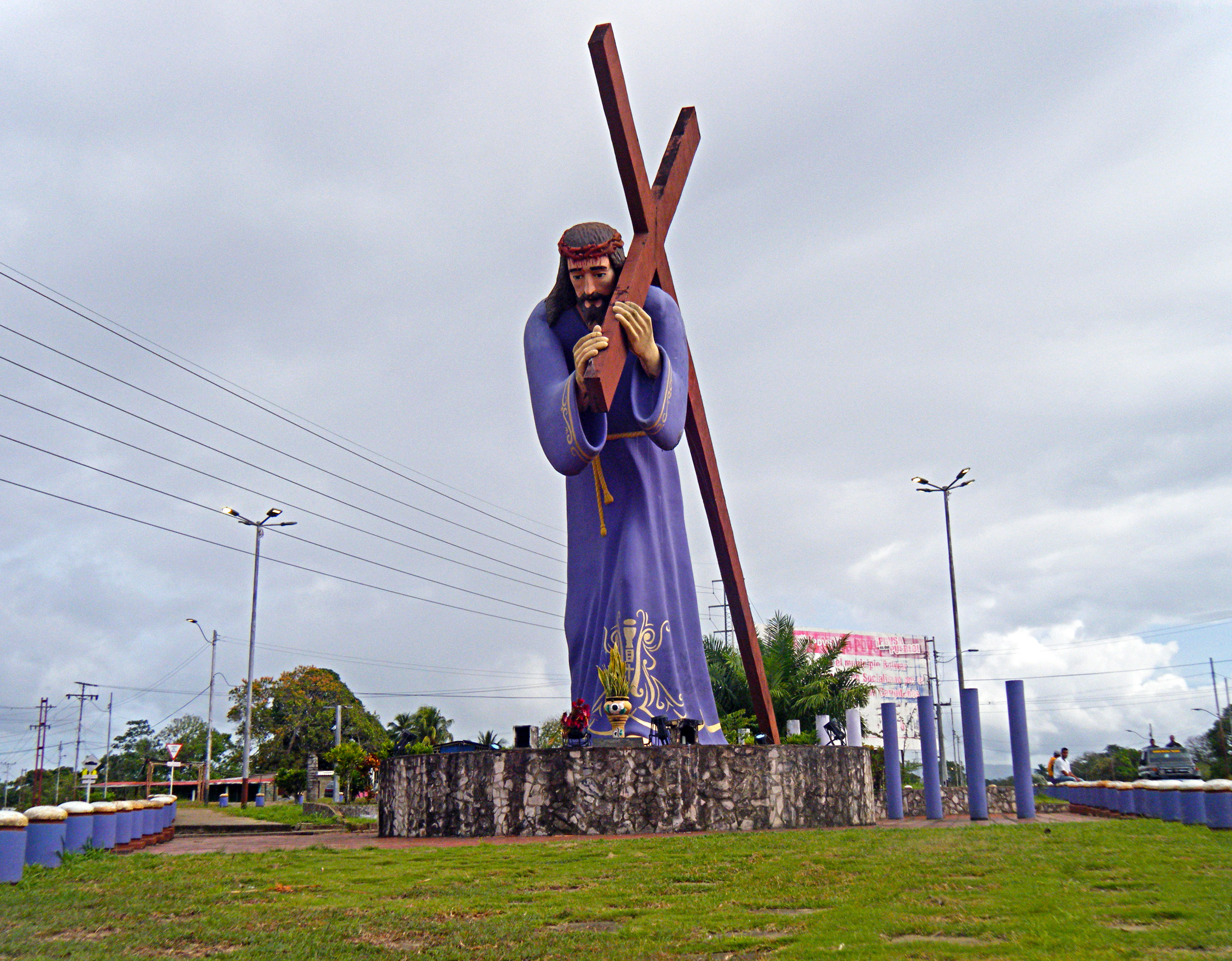
- Nazareno monument on Caripito

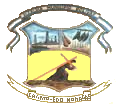
- Coat of arms

- Location within Venezuela
- Coordinates: 10°07′N 63°06′W
- Country: Venezuela
- State: Monagas

Caripito is a city in the state of Monagas, Venezuela. It has around 50,000 inhabitants. It is the third largest city in the state, after Maturín and Punta de Mata.

== History ==
Caripito is first recorded as a mission town, but the existence of this first settlement was short as it was destroyed by a major fire on 17 March 1783. Caripito has been known by a number of names, including La Palencia, San Juan, Caripe Horno, and finally Caripito, as a diminutive of the nearby Caripe. The town achieved political and territorial recognition when the Colón municipality was created in 1896. In 1910, the first school in Caripito was established. In 1924 the Standard Oil Company began oil exploration activities in the area and Caripito experienced a slight repopulation. When oil exploitation began in 1928 Caripito received an important boost to its urban development from the arrival of migrant labor, particularly from the Caribbean islands. In 1929, the Creole Petroleum Corporation (Standard Oil) began to build a storage yard and deep-water pier on the San Juan River and on October 15, 1930, the first tanker left the port with 20 thousand barrels of oil bound for Trinidad.

The establishment of the Harbor Master's Office, independent from that of Güiria, as well as the development of modern health services, hotels, power plants, transport links, military garrison, schools, an airport, and other civic amenities accelerated the development of the city, drawing migrant families from the states of Sucre and Nueva Esparta as well as the United States and the Caribbean. In 1931 the Standard Oil Company opened a local oil refinery with an initial capacity of 26 thousand barrels per day, the second of its kind after the San Lorenzo refinery built in the State of Zulia in 1917. In 1935 a Caripito terminal was opened on the San Juan River where Pan Am seaplanes could arrive from Central America and the Caribbean. In 1936 Caripito International Airport was selected by Amelia Earhart as the second stop on her trip around the world, spending the night at the Standard Oil Company facilities. The event was widely publicized in the world press and the company provided logistical support to continue the flight through South America.

In 1938, the Creole Petroleum Corporation increased the capacity of Caripito to 70 thousand barrels per day, making it the most important refinery in Venezuela until the expansion of the Amuay and Cardón refineries was completed in the mid-1950s. Caripito became the capital of the Bolívar District under a decree of January 19, 1940, signed by Governor José María Isava on January 30. Between 1941 and 1961 the population of Caripito doubled as a result of intense economic activity, but by the mid-1970s a third of the population had emigrated due to decline in oil production. In 1976, Creole's assets were nationalized and were managed by Gulf Oil subsidiary Lagoven, later by Corpoven and now by PDVSA in association with Repsol. After closing the refinery in 1976 and the oil terminal in 2002, attempts have been made to boost agricultural activity to take advantage of the fertile land.

== Public and historic spaces ==
- Iglesia Sagrado Corazón de Jesús (Church Sacred Heart of Jesus): It was built in 1936.
- Monumento al Nazareno (Monument to the Nazarene): Built in 2005. It is an image of the Nazarene, 20 meters high.
