= Amuay =

- Location within Venezuela
- Coordinates: 11°47′00″N 70°14′00″W
- Country: Venezuela
- State: Falcón
- Climate: BWh

Amuay (Spanish pronunciation: [aˈmwaj]) is a fishing town located in the Paraguana Peninsula, in Falcón state, Venezuela. It is a natural bay, also has a fishing port and the bigger part of the Paraguana Refinery Complex (one of the largest oil refineries in the world at 940,000 barrels per day or 149,000 cubic metres per day) is located there.

This natural bay was extended to supply oil tankers. Despite the presence of the Oil Refinery, beaches near the bay are healthy and the water is crystalline. The nearest cities to Amuay are Judibana and Punto Fijo.

== History ==
Amuay appears for first time in a map by the year 1800. Its first inhabitants belonged to the native tribe "Amuayes", who populated the Paraguana Peninsula with the "Moruyes" tribe members. They used to exchange products by barter. Amuay means "caquetío" in their native language: Place where water and winds meet. Until 1947 it was only barely populated as a fishing village; after that year, the Creole Petroleum Corporation built the refinery and this changed the way of life of the villagers. At 01:11 on August 25, 2012, an explosion tore through the gas storage facility in Amuay with 39 confirmed dead and 80 wounded. Venezuelan President Hugo Chavez ordered an urgent investigation and announced three days of national mourning.

== Tourism ==
Amuay is located in the Paraguana Peninsula which is a duty-free zone since year 1998. Near to Amuay is a Eurobuilding Hotel called Villa Caribe, malls, beaches and clubs.

== See also ==
- Paraguana Refinery Complex
- Punto Fijo
- Falcón
