= Orinoco Mining Arc =

Mineral deposit area and environmental harm in Venezuela

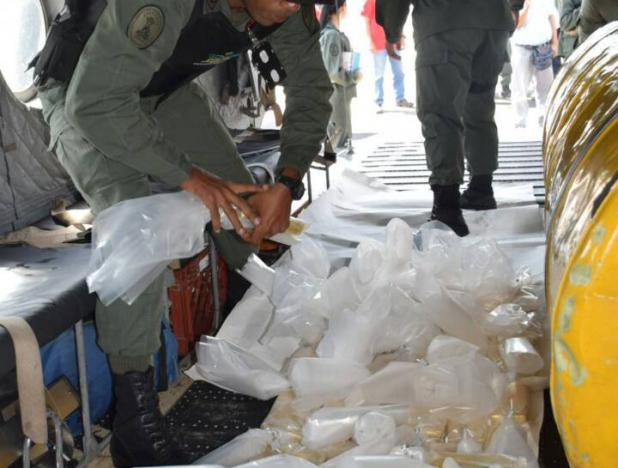
Entry to the Central Bank of Venezuela of 749 kilograms of gold from the Orinoco Mining Arc on 18 November 2017

The Orinoco Mining Arc (OMA), is a resource-rich area in Venezuela that has become a hub for illegal mining. It was opened to development in February 2016 as the "Orinoco Mining Arc National Strategic Development Zone", and has been operating since 2017; The Orinoco Mining Arc covers 12.2% of Venezuelan territory with an area of 111,843 km^{2}. Gold is the most important resource in the area, and there are also deposits of bauxite, coltan, and diamonds. According to former minister Roberto Mirabal, the Mining Arc has a potential mineral value of $2 trillion US dollars.

The Academy of Physical, Mathematical and Natural Sciences, the Venezuelan Society of Ecology, the Association of Archaeologists and Archaeologists of Venezuela (AAAV), the National Assembly of Venezuela, the Latin America and Caribbean (LACA) Section of the Society for Conservation Biology (SCB), and the NGO PROVEA have publicly expressed their concern at the non-compliance with environmental and sociocultural impact studies, the violation of rights to prior consultation with indigenous communities, cultural and natural heritage, and national sovereignty.

In 2020, the United Nations High Commissioner for Human Rights, Michelle Bachelet, denounced that workers in the Orinoco Mining Arc are subjected to serious abuse and violence that caused at least 149 deaths between 2016 and 2020.

== Location ==
The Arco Minero spans an area south of the Orinoco river and covers the Venezuelan states of Amazonas, Bolívar and Delta Amacuro. The region is one of the most biodiverse areas of the Amazon rainforest. Nearby Canaima National Park is a UNESCO World Heritage site. Mining has been reported inside Canaima National Park, Yapacana National Park, and in the Alto Orinoco-Casiquiare Biosphere Reserve.

The region is traditional territory of several Indigenous peoples, including the Kari’ña, Warao, Arawak, Pemón, Ye’kwana, Sanemá o Hotï, Eñe’pa, Panare, Wánai, Mapoyo, Piaroa and Hiwi.

== History ==
The Orinoco Mining Arc Strategic Development Zone was originally proposed by the Chávez administration in 2011. It was opened to development by president Nicolas Maduro in 2016 in an attempt to halt the Venezuelan economic crisis and bolster support for his increasingly unpopular administration.

The mining arc has become a center for illegal mining.

RAISG, (a network of Amazonian NGOs) reports that the Mining Arc has made Venezuela the Amazon country with the highest number of illegal mines. According to the organization SOS Orinoco, in the last 20 years, 779,600 hectares of forest have been destroyed.

In 2021, Unesco's World Heritage Centre resolved to review the impact of mining in Canaima national park. The Canadian Embassy in Venezuela reported at least 59 illegal mines in Canaima park, some of them only 23 km from Angel Falls, with large areas being devastated by open-pit mining operations.

== Impact ==
A group of scientists, members of the Latin America and Caribbean Section of the Society for Conservation Biology, denounced that although the Orinoco Mining Arc was initially designed to tighten government oversight over mineral mining and trading in the Guayana region of Venezuela, it has instead promoted the development of a complex network of intertwined legal and illegal activities throughout the country. The impact beyond its proposed borders is exemplified by the proliferation of mines inside protected areas and on top of tepuys that are protected as natural monuments.

In 2020, the Office of the United Nations High Commissioner for Human Rights reported that workers in the Arco Minero were exposed to high levels of violence and exploitation by criminal groups that control the mines. They also said that illegal mining destroyed Indigenous peoples' habitat and threatened their sovereignty over their traditional territories.

In 2020, the Center for Strategic and International Studies (CSIS) reported that illegal mining involved about 500,000 workers in the Arco Minero. Many Indigenous people have been coerced into working for the mines by threat of violence, with violent repression of people who resist the mines. Nearly half of the miners are children.

Moreover, per CSIS, as mercury from mining has seeped into the soil and water systems, local indigenous populations have been exposed at dangerous levels. In the Caura river basin, a tributary to the Orinoco, 92 percent of indigenous women had elevated levels of mercury, which could damage the kidney and brain and impede fetal development.

Mining has created standing water and unsanitary conditions that result in a surge in malaria cases in the region.

The most important environmental impacts of mining in the region are the destruction of ecosystems and rivers, the modification of topography, habitat fragmentation, and the pollution of water and fish by sediment and mercury. More data is urgently needed to evaluate the ecological consequences of the Orinoco Mining Arc on natural populations of plants and animals.

The increase in mining activity has also increased the size of the human population and the influence of non-indigenous culture in the region. Displacement of entire communities due to the degradation of public health services and increased security risks.

== Trafficking ==
With the cooperation of the Venezuelan military and local authorities, who receive bribes paid in gold, illegal gold is moved into Brazil, Guyana, Colombia, and islands in the Caribbean, where fraudulent paperwork enables the gold to be sold in legal international markets.

== See also ==
- Deforestation of the Amazon rainforest
- Environmental issues in Venezuela
- Bulla Loca mine disaster
- 2023 El Palito oil spill
- 2020 El Palito oil spill
- Orinoco Belt
- Mining in Venezuela
