= Amuay tragedy =

Venezuelan refinery explosion

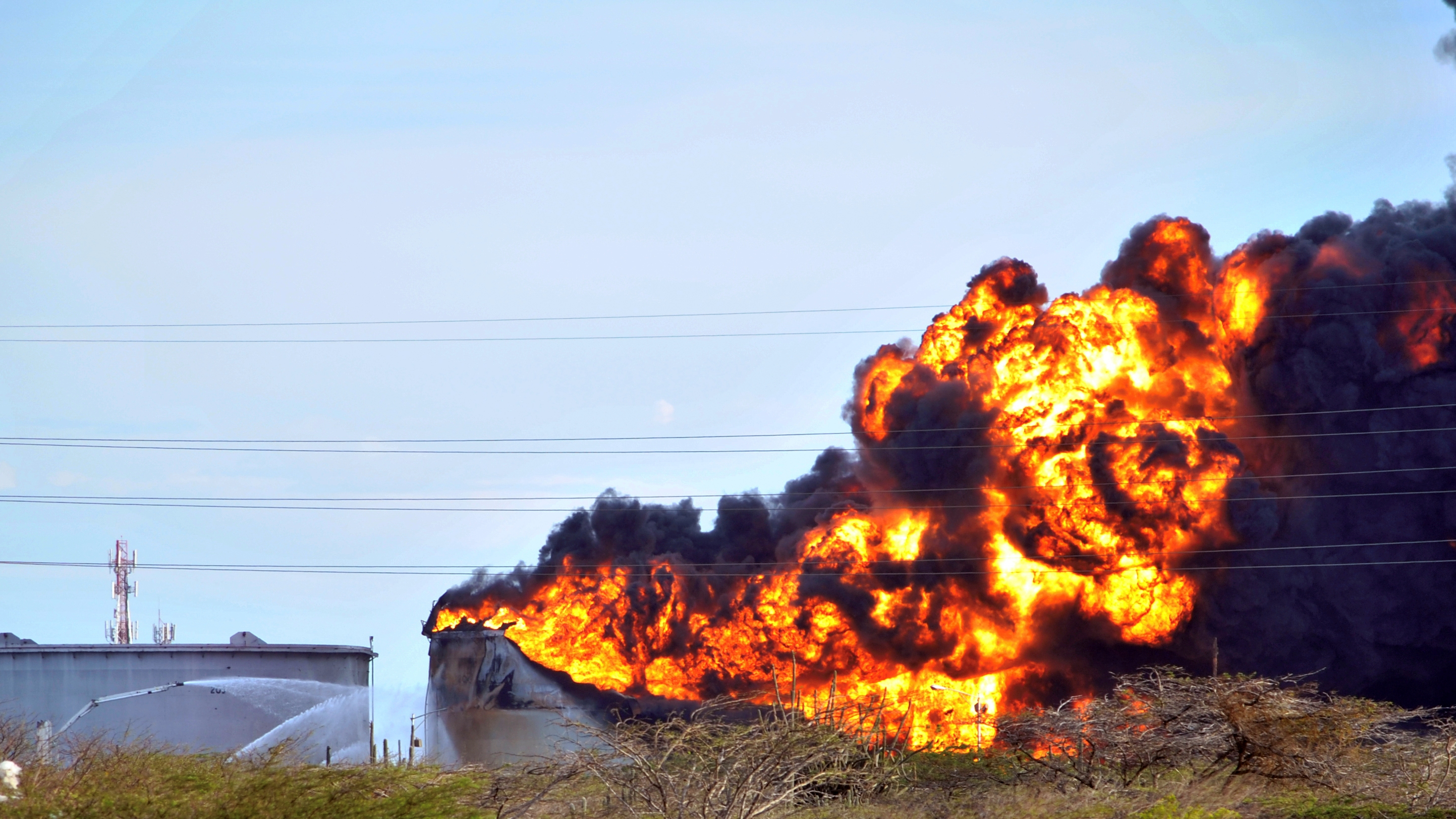
- Oil tank burning after the 2012 Amuay refinery explosion.
- Date: 24 August 2012
- Time: 01:11 VET
- Location: Amuay Refinery, Paraguaná Refinery Complex, Punto Fijo, Venezuela; 11°44′48″N 70°11′42″W
- Cause: Ignition of gas leak
- Deaths: 48+
- Injuries: 151+

The Amuay tragedy was an explosion at PDVSA's Amuay Refinery, Paraguaná Refinery Complex in Punto Fijo, Venezuela. The explosion resulted in the death of at least 48 people and injured at least 151 others.

== Explosion ==
On 25 August 2012 at 01:11 (05:41 GMT), an explosion caused by the ignition of leaking gas at the Amuay refinery, a part of the PDVSA-owned Paraguaná Refinery Complex, killed at least 48 people, primarily National Guard troops stationed at the plant, and injured at least 151 others. A 10-year-old boy was among the dead.

In addition to the refinery, more than 1,600 homes were damaged by the shockwave.

== Reactions ==
Three days of national mourning were declared by President Hugo Chávez. He also ordered a probe into the cause of the fire. Chávez said he was creating a US$23 million fund for clean-up operations and a replacement of destroyed homes. He said that "60 new homes were ready for affected families to move into, 60 more would be finished soon, and a further 137 houses would be handed over next month." He also rejected claims that PDVSA might be responsible for the disaster. The first were extinguished by 28 August 2012.

Venezuelan presidential candidate Henrique Capriles Radonski criticized PDVSA management for their poor safety record and lack of maintenance as a cause of the accident. President Chávez, who claimed that it was too early to identify the cause, as well as minister Ramírez, said that Capriles did not "know what he's talking about". Iván Freites, the Secretary-General of the United Federation of Oil Workers, held the government responsible "lack of maintenance and investment" in the industry, considering it the main cause of the explosion. Freites denounced that since 2011, the union of oil workers had complained about problems with "damaged equipment, lack of spare parts and other unsafe conditions".

== See also ==
- 2020 El Palito oil spill
- 2023 El Palito oil spill
