= Environmental issues in Venezuela =

Environmental issues in Venezuela include oil spills, illegal mining, deforestation, tourism, water shortages, pollution, poor waste management and hazards such as earthquakes, floods, rockslides, mudslides, and periodic droughts.

Venezuela ranks among the world's most ecologically diverse countries. However, it has suffered great environmental degradation. It has the third-highest deforestation rate in South America The Guri Dam, one of the world's largest, flooded a massive forested area and is now being filled with silt deposited by runoff from deforested areas. Environmental issues include sewage pollution into Valencia Lake, oil and urban pollution of Maracaibo Lake, deforestation, soil degradation, and urban and industrial pollution, especially along the Caribbean coast. Current concerns also include irresponsible mining operations that endanger the rain-forest ecosystem and indigenous peoples. Successive governments have attempted to develop environmental regulations. However, only 35 to 40 percent of Venezuela's land is regulated thus far, 29 percent as part of national parks.

Venezuela has ratified 14 international conventions regarding environmental protection and sustainable development, while also taking forward-looking steps internally to protect and preserve the country's natural wealth. Venezuela has 43 national parks and 36 natural monuments, and is the country in Latin America with the largest proportion of protected lands, with over 55 percent of its total territory. (Parks and monuments are only 17 percent of that total; the remaining protected areas are outside those parks and monuments.) The nation was ranked second in South America and ninth in the world on the Happy Planet Index of 2012, with a score of 56.9. The UN analysis estimates in 2019 that 25% of Venezuelans need some form of humanitarian assistance. Venezuela led the world in murder rates, with 81.4 per 100,000 people killed in 2018, making it the third most violent country in the world.

There was oil production in Venezuela as early as 1878. Water quality deteriorated drastically starting from around 2000 with the beginning of oil activities offshore, which greatly increased the amount of both organic and inorganic pollutants. One of such activities is the release of drilling gravel containing high levels of metals or minerals, e.g., barite, cadmium, and mercury. Other examples of polluting activities are the dredging of sediments and the testing and laying of pipes.

== Water pollution ==
=== Zulia-Falcón area ===
Countless sewage systems with not only human waste but also chemicals pour into the sea all along the coast.

=== Eastern Venezuela ===
Several recent oil spills have led to water pollution. In February 2012 a pipeline of PDVSA ruptured next to the Guarapiche River and fouled it for many days. The technicians in charge refused to close down the pumping because they did not want to stop the process, and this led to massive pollution of the area. A dam providing water to Maturín was said to be polluted, even though the national government denied this. This has led to a rupture between the national government and the Monagas governor.

=== Valencia Lake and Valencia Basin ===
The Valencia Lake, formerly praised by Alexander von Humboldt for its beauty, is massively polluted due to the countless sewage systems pouring wastewater.

Pollution levels in the whole Carabobo area have increased over the years. After the Carabobo governor denounced tap water as no longer drinkable, Hugo Chávez said that was part of an agenda of fear and what the opposition governor said was "nearly criminal".

The city of Valencia, Los Guayos, Guacara and many other locations get their water supply from the Pao-Cachinche dam to the south of Valencia. At the same time, this dam gets about 80% of the sewage systems from Valencia. The installations for water treatment, the responsibility of the national government centre Hidrocentro, are in disrepair. In 2007 the national government decided to pump water from the Valencia Lake – water unfit for human consumption – to the Pao-Cachinche dam. It installed a pumping plant in Los Guayos to do this.

== Forests ==
Venezuela had a 2018 Forest Landscape Integrity Index mean score of 8.78/10, ranking it 19th globally out of 172 countries.

=== Tree cover extent and loss ===
Global Forest Watch publishes annual estimates of tree cover loss and 2000 tree cover extent derived from time-series analysis of Landsat satellite imagery in the Global Forest Change dataset. In this framework, tree cover refers to vegetation taller than 5 m (including natural forests and tree plantations), and tree cover loss is defined as the complete removal of tree cover canopy for a given year, regardless of cause.

For Venezuela, country statistics report cumulative tree cover loss of 2,566,853 ha (25,668.53 km^{2}) from 2001 to 2024 (about 4.5% of its 2000 tree cover area). For tree cover density greater than 30%, country statistics report a 2000 tree cover extent of 56,519,470 ha (565,194.7 km^{2}). The charts and table below display this data. In simple terms, the annual loss number is the area where tree cover disappeared in that year, and the extent number shows what remains of the 2000 tree cover baseline after subtracting cumulative loss. Forest regrowth is not included in the dataset.

Annual tree cover loss in Venezuela, 2001–2024. View chart definition.
Tree cover extent in 2000 minus cumulative tree cover loss in Venezuela, 2001–2024 (loss-only residual; does not account for gain). View chart definition.

Annual tree cover extent and loss
| Year | Tree cover extent (km2) (Note: This residual measure does not include forest regrowth.) | Annual tree cover loss (km2) |
|---|---|---|
| 2001 | 563,955.69 | 1,239.01 |
| 2002 | 563,052.29 | 903.40 |
| 2003 | 562,180.11 | 872.18 |
| 2004 | 561,270.85 | 909.26 |
| 2005 | 560,321.31 | 949.54 |
| 2006 | 559,466.26 | 855.05 |
| 2007 | 558,322.86 | 1,143.40 |
| 2008 | 557,117.01 | 1,205.85 |
| 2009 | 555,692.47 | 1,424.54 |
| 2010 | 554,679.51 | 1,012.96 |
| 2011 | 553,935.44 | 744.07 |
| 2012 | 552,875.93 | 1,059.51 |
| 2013 | 552,231.03 | 644.90 |
| 2014 | 551,221.62 | 1,009.41 |
| 2015 | 550,608.26 | 613.36 |
| 2016 | 548,534.90 | 2,073.36 |
| 2017 | 546,864.92 | 1,669.98 |
| 2018 | 545,743.26 | 1,121.66 |
| 2019 | 544,336.27 | 1,406.99 |
| 2020 | 542,944.05 | 1,392.22 |
| 2021 | 542,300.67 | 643.38 |
| 2022 | 541,743.19 | 557.48 |
| 2023 | 540,977.11 | 766.08 |
| 2024 | 539,526.17 | 1,450.94 |

== Glacier retreat ==
In 2024, Venezuela lost its last glacier, the Humboldt Glacier, also known as La Corona, which dwindled to less than 2 hectares (5 acres), prompting scientists to reclassify it as merely an ice field. Historically nestled in the Sierra Nevada de Mérida at about 5,000 metres (16,000 ft) above sea level, the region was originally home to six glaciers, with the rest having vanished by 2011. Despite projections that the Humboldt Glacier would persist for another decade, unexpected rapid melting accelerated by the recent El Niño-induced high temperatures led to its premature disappearance. This melting reflects a broader trend observed across the Andes, where glaciers have been retreating rapidly due to intensified sunlight and radiation at tropical latitudes. This stark transformation, which climatologists describe as a significant indicator of modern climate change effects, places Venezuela as possibly the first country in contemporary times to lose all its glaciers.

== See also ==
- Agriculture in Venezuela
- 2020 El Palito oil spill
- 2023 El Palito oil spill
- Heavy metals | Cadmium poisoning | Mercury poisoning
- Orinoco Mining Arc
