= Creole Petroleum Corporation =

20th century American oil company operating in Venezuela

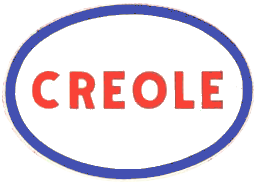
- Formerly: Creole Syndicate (1920-28)
- Type: Public (1920–28) (Note: Began trading on the New York Curb Exchange in October 1920.); Subsidiary/Public (1928–76)
- Industry: Petroleum
- Founded: March 30, 1920
- Defunct: January 1, 1976; 50 years ago
- Fate: Nationalised by the Government of Venezuela
- Headquarters: Venezuela
- Area served: Venezuela
- Parent: Standard Oil of New Jersey (1928–76)

The Creole Petroleum Corporation was an American oil company. It was formed in 1920 to produce fields on Lake Maracaibo, Venezuela. Gulf Oil began field operations on behalf of Creole in 1924 and Creole received royalty payments from the oil that was found. In 1928, the Standard Oil of New Jersey gained a controlling interest by merger with its own Venezuelan operation and a cash infusion. A few weeks later, the company discovered the Quiriquire oil field, the first major oil strike in Eastern Venezuela. After merging with Standard's Lago Petroleum Corporation in 1943, for a few years until 1951, it was the world's number one oil producer when it was supplanted by the Arabian American Oil Company. In 1951 Creole was responsible for more than a third of Standard Oil of New Jersey's net income.

In 1950, Creole opened its refinery at Amuay bay. This is now a part of the Paraguaná Refinery Complex considered the world's third largest refinery complex, just after Jamnagar Refinery (India) and Ulsan Refinery (South Korea).

The Venezuelan assets of Creole Petroleum Corporation were nationalized along with those of other foreign oil firms on January 1, 1976, becoming as Lagoven filial part of PDVSA, a Venezuelan government-owned operating company.

== History ==
The Creole Syndicate in March 1928 was controlled by Naphen & Co, Blair & Co and their associates, with large blocks of stocks held in Europe. It owned 1,400,000 hectares of oil concessions in Venezuela and from its Lake Maracaibo properties, which were operated by the Venezuela Gulf Oil Co. under a contract signed in 1924, produced upward of 300,000bbl per month. It was developing the wholly-owned Rio Palmar field on its own account.

The Standard Oil Company of Venezuela had drilled 25 wildcats in the Maracaibo Basin before 1928.

The Creole Syndicate stockholders on March 16, 1928 voted to increase capital from 2,500,000 to 6,000,000 shares and to allow the friendly takeover of 51% (Note: 2,225,000 shares acquired in exchange for the entire outstanding stock of Standard Oil of Venezuela and 800,000 shares acquired at $10 per share.) of the stock by Standard Oil of New Jersey, in exchange for $8 million in cash for working capital and all Standard properties in Venezuela (directly owned or indirectly through the Standard Oil Co. of Venezuela and the American British Oil Co. subsidiaries), to wit: 780,000 hectares of concessions in Western and 400,000 hectares in Eastern Venezuela districts and contracts in place with British Controlled Oilfields, Ltd., Central Area Exploration Co., Maracaibo Oil Exploration Co. and others. Concurrently Creole acquired all stock of Venezuela International Corp., owner of 1,280,000 hectares of exploration concessions. The name of the company was changed to Creole Petroleum Corp. Gulf Oil was squeezed out as distributor of Creole's production and Jersey in 1929 shipped the 20,000bpd principally to its Bayonne and Baltimore refineries. Gulf Oil however continued to operate Creole's Lake Maracaibo fields until at least 1950.

Standard Oil of New Jersey over time increased its stake in the company to gain more complete control. In November 1930 1,000,000 new shares were issued at $4.25 for additional working capital. On April 27, 1931 a unitization agreement became effective in the Eastern oil districts, whereby the several oil companies coordinated to avoid the cut-throat competition and infrastructure duplication that had years ago plagued the industry in the Mexican Golden Lane fields. On May 28, 1932 Standard completed the reorganization which involved the transfer of all assets to the Standard Oil Co. of Venezuela, which acted as the wholly-owned operating-subsidiary of Creole Petroleum. Nelson Rockefeller served on the Creole board from 1935 to 1940.

External videos
- People & Petroleum: The Story of Creole in Venezuela (1950)
- 1936 1,006,000 19+7/8 39 37+1/2 ube.com/watch?v=KkxpeLRDpiQ Assignment: Venezuela (1956)

In 1933 the no-par common stock was changed to $5 par. As of January 1955, Standard Oil of New Jersey owned 94.5% of Creole common stock. On May 20, 1955, the 25,865,310 shares where split 3-for-1 into 77,595,930 shares (a 200% stock dividend) and authorized capital was increased to 90,000,000 shares. In 1955 the old stock had reached a high of $151 on the American Stock Exchange, a market capitalization of $3.906 billion, of which some $215 million was not sitting in the Standard Oil treasury.

== Assets ==
=== West ===
The Rio Palmar field (map:) was insignificant. It had a lifetime production of only 24,259bbl. There were however at least 11 prospecting wells drilled in the vicinity.

Creole held the major portion of the Cumarebo field (map:) opened in April 1931. On a parcel taken over from the British North Venezuela Petroleum Co Ltd, which in 1921 had acquired the Francisco Jimenez Arraiz concession, originally granted on July 3, 1907, SOV struck light oil (41-50° API) with Cumarebo No. 1 at 627ft flowing at 1,000bpd on April 14, 1931. SOV struck a flow of 750bpd at 1,814ft with Cumarebo No. 2 (1 mile north of No. 1) in August. A 3 mile (10,000bpd) 6-inch pipe line was completed in 1932 to connect the field to the coastal terminal (Tucupido, near Puerto Cumarebo) where a 4,000ft 11 3/4-inch sea line allowed the loading of ocean tankers.

=== East ===
After Quiriquire No. 1 had struck a flow of 438bpd of 16.3° crude at 2,243ft on June 1, 1928, in August 1930 the major Quiriquire field (map:) began commercial production and through the new (29km) 8-inch pipe line delivered an average of 7,568bpd during the remainder of 1930 to the new tank farm at Caripito and from there via 3 miles of 12-inch pipe to the terminal on the San Juan river. This was the first pipe line laid in Eastern Venezuela. Quiriquire was the second oil field of the East, a discovery in 1914 (Note: The General Asphalt Company acquired a concession for oil rights on July 14, 1910 and transferred it to its subsidiary Bermudez Co.) at the Guanoco asphalt lake produced a lifetime total of 1,858,415bbl of very heavy oil (10.5° API; from at least 10 wells) and was shut down in 1931. The company soon built a topping plant near Caripito (3 miles from the loading terminal, connected via narrow gauge railroad) and for the first time became independent of Standard's refineries in the United States. A contract for shipments to Chile formed the nucleus of the direct export business. The furthest corporate outpost was the airfield, 5 miles beyond the Quiriquire field. Some time before 1944 a 10-inch loop was laid between Quiriquire and Caripito and capacity increased to 75,000bpd.

In 1934 a new terminal downstream of Caripito was built at Guiria for the loading of deep draft ocean tankers. There were 3 submarine loading lines in place when the terminal opened for business in August 1935. Already in 1938, two underwater pipes had to be pulled out for maintenance. This terminal was closed in 1948, after dredging had made Caripito accessible to deep draft vessels. Guiria over its lifetime handled some 50 million barrels.

The Temblador field began commercial operations with the first shipment of 19,000bbl on February 16, 1938, delivered through 32 miles of 10-inch SOV-owned pipeline to the Boca de Uracoa terminal (9.1273°N 62.33°W) on the Cano Manamo river, from where shallow draft tankers moved the 21-23° API oil to Guiria. In 1958 a 92 mile 30-inch 48,000bpd line was laid to transport Temblador oil to the Caripito refinery. The above-ground unheated line with 2 pumping stations was the second most economical of 7 options considered to solve the problem of moving the viscous oil, the most economical, pumping an oil/water mixture through a 20-inch unheated above-ground line, was thoroughly tested, but dismissed due to remaining uncertainty about how the mixture would behave in real-world conditions and because the larger pipe would probably allow a later increase in throughput. The intermediate pumping station was unattended and remote-controlled. Mainline construction began on January 4, 1958 and progress per spread was some 6,500ft per day. The project costing $13 million was made attractive by an increase in demand for heavy oil.

On October 12, 1938 S.O.V. struck 32.3° API oil at 4,920ft with Jusepin No. 1 flowing at 768bpd, located 25 miles southwest of Quiriquire, making Jusepin the first light oil field in Eastern Venezuela. On September 21, 1939 the first oil was pumped through the new 43 mile 10-inch 40,000bpd pipe line connecting the field to Caripito. A complete refinery (gasoline, diesel, fuel oil, naphtha, asphalt) of 31,000bpd capacity was started at Caripito in January 1939 and inaugurated on October 21, 1939, It had an 8,000kw power plant and a cracking unit. The first tanker was loaded with products on November 15, 1939. In 1944 a 111.4 mile 16-inch 97,000bpd pipe line was built to connect Jusepin to Puerto La Cruz and placed in operation in February 1945. The Mene Grande Oil Company had a 1/3 interest in the line. The new outlet resulted in a shorter tanker haul for shipments to the United States, was a tide water port and at the time Puerto La Cruz was already on its way to become the most important oil port in Eastern Venezuela.

=== Misc ===
The Tacagua pipeline (nicknamed the "Steepest Inch") was a 10 mile 8-inch products pipeline from Catia la Mar to Caracas built by Creole and the Shell Caribbean Petroleum Company and commissioned in November 1950. It increased the capacity of the former arrangement of a Shell line to Boqueron where it reached the railway (which could transport 2,050bpd) and the highway (which had to make up the rest of the demand, projected to reach 20,000bpd by 1955). After leaving the only pumping station at the inlet, oil first rose to 2,300ft and descended by 1,000ft into the Tacagua Valley before rising again to the 3,100ft high terminus at Caracas. To account for the significant pressure differences, the 8 5/8 outer diameter pipe used came in thicknesses of 0.322-inch (28.55 pounds per foot) and 0.4-inch (35.14 pounds per foot; used in the first 50% of the initial climb and at the very bottom of the valley). The normal operating pressure at Catia la Mar was 1,240psi when pumping the rated maximum of 36,000bpd of gasoline. Also transported were kerosine, aviation gasoline and diesel fuel, a mechanical plug was inserted whenever there was a switchover. Work on clearing the right-of-way began around April 1950.

== Statistics ==
- By company
  - 1928-1929: monthly production and shipments.

Earnings
| | Revenue | Profit | Revenue | Profit |
| | | | Standard of NJ (consolidated) | |
|---|---|---|---|---|
| 1928 | $2,527,004 | $611,731 | | |
| 1929 | 5,797,692 | 2,434,189 | | |
| 1930 | 4,191,707 | 1,665,045 | | |
| 1931 | 3,954,733 | -4,510,465 | | |
| 1932 | 7,184,078 | 2,075,404 | | |
| 1933 | 8,314,904 | 4,106,099 | | |
| 1934 | 14,831,960 | 5,315,254 | | |
| 1935 | 20,044,553 | 5,509,067 | | |
| 1936 | 24,205,143 | 8,596,448 | | |
| 1937 | 30,830,143 | 11,218,752 | | |
| 1938 | 28,814,699 | 11,464,757 | | |
| 1939 | 26,880,705 | 9,590,366 | | |
| 1940 | 26,708,340 | 6,834,170 | | |
...
| 1945 | 183,136,800 | 64,601,800 | | |
| 1946 | 244,130,500 | 83,305,700 | | |
| 1947 | 380,359,800 | 130,750,300 | | |
| 1948 | 548,675,200 | 198,655,600 | | |
| 1949 | 434,543,600 | 116,149,100 | | |
| 1950 | 515,615,900 | 166,930,300 | 3,198,266,000 | 408,223,000 |
| 1951 | 604,644,200 | 202,278,300 | 3,863,317,000 | 528,461,000 |
| 1952 | 647,775,800 | 220,931,000 | | |
| 1953 | 675,310,200 | 228,997,000 | | |
| 1954 | 718,527,400 | 239,650,700 | | |

Creole Petroleum Corp common
| Year | Sales | Low | High | Close |
|---|---|---|---|---|
| 1928 | 3,478,300 | 9 1/2 | 17 1/2 | 11 1/4 |
| 1929 | 1,244,550 | 5 5/8 | 11 3/4 | 6 1/8 |
| 1930 | 524,550 | 3 | 7 5/8 | 3 1/2 |
| 1931 | 268,300 | 1 5/8 | 3 7/8 | 2 |
| 1932 | 236,900 | 1 3/4 | 3 1/8 | 2 5/8 |
| 1933 | 831,000 | 4 3/4 | 12 | 10 3/4 |
| 1934 | 758,500 | 9 5/8 | 14 3/8 | 13 1/8 |
| 1935 | 931,100 | 10 | 23 3/4 | 21 3/4 |
| 1936 | 1,006,000 | 19 7/8 | 39 | 37 1/2 |
| 1937 | 446,300 | 20 1/4 | 38 3/4 | 23 |
| 1938 | 283,000 | 17 1/2 | 27 1/2 | 23 3/4 |
| 1939 | 264,100 | 16 3/4 | 28 | 22 1/4 |
| 1940 | 207,500 | 11 5/8 | 24 1/4 | 14 |
| 1941 | 207,700 | 12 1/2 | 19 3/4 | 14 1/2 |
| 1942 | 121,100 | 11 5/8 | 19 | 16 1/4 |
| 1943 | 407,600 | 15 3/4 | 30 1/8 | 26 1/2 |
| 1944 | 279,200 | 27 1/8 | 22 5/8 | 27 |
| 1945 | 498,800 | 24 | 34 | 33 |
| 1946 | 398,200 | 24 7/8 | 38 | 31 1/2 |
| 1947 | 384,600 | 25 3/4 | 43 1/4 | 43 |
| 1948 | 399,100 | 37 1/8 | 53 1/4 | 41 1/4 |
| 1949 | 314,050 | 28 1/2 | 41 1/8 | 32 1/2 |
| 1950 | 642,800 | 30 3/8 | 52 1/2 | 52 1/2 |
| 1951 | 241,850 | 52 3/8 | 85 | 72 7/8 |
| 1952 | 352,200 | 69 1/8 | 31 5/8 | 75 |
| 1953 | 252,300 | 67 1/2 | 76 1/2 | 73 1/4 |
| 1954 | 400,100 | 73 1/2 | 127 1/2 | 120 1/2 |
| 1955 | 111,400 | 120 1/4 | 151 | |
| 1955 (new) | 426,926 | 45 1/2 | 73 1/2 | 69 1/2 |
| 1956 | 502,500 | 66 1/8 | 95 7/8 | 91 |
| 1957 | 352,900 | 71 3/8 | 96 | 72 1/4 |
| 1958 | 706,900 | 58 1/4 | 78 7/8 | 62 7/8 |
| 1959 | 762,200 | 37 | 65 3/8 | 37 3/4 |

== Creole Syndicate ==
The Superior No. 1 well struck 21.5° at 1,887ft flowing at 1,800bpd in the La Rosa field on September 2, 1924. On November 1, 1924, two additional wells were drilling.

On the New York Curb Market during 1924, Creole stock climbed from $2 1/3 in January to a high of $10 1/2 in November.

In January 1925, Venezuela Gulf Oil Co ("Gulf") began shipping oil with two shallow draft tankers from their terminal at Cabimas. The tankers could carry 18,000 to 20,000bbl, but due to the shallowness of the Toblazas (inner channel), they were limited to carry 12,000bbl. Their destination was the Gulf terminal at Las Piedras Bay (Paraguana). The tanker Cabimas (Note: built by Palmers in 1924) made the first run on January 18, 1925 and the Paraguana (Note: built by Palmers in 1925) followed on January 22. The production came from 3 wells on the Superior (No. 1 and No. 2) and Michigan (No. 1) parcels (together a little over 900 acres) operated under lease from the Creole Syndicate and yielding about 4,000bpd of 22-24°, considerably better than the Mene Grande crude. These wells were approximately 500 feet beyond the shoreline, while the Cabimas dock reached 1,200ft into the lake.

Ocean tankers shipped the oil to Gulf's Port Arthur refinery. In the fall of 1925, at the site of Gulf's Bayonne bulk distribution station, work began on a 20,000bpd topping plant, which was to make fuel oil and some gasoline entirely from Venezuelan oil. The first shipments were 74,000bbl in January and 2x80,000bbl in March 1926. The refinery began initial operations in February and in June 1926 attained its 20,000bpd capacity. The shipping distances from Port Arthur and Lake Maracaibo to New York City are about equal.

La Rosa production in 1925
| | Gulf-Creole | Lago | VOC | Total | Venezuela Total |
|---|---|---|---|---|---|
| <1925 | | | | 3,278,287 | 15,294,948 |
| Jan | 48,000 | 244,800 | 352,500 | 645,300 | 1,236,000 |
| Feb | 105,600 | 171,000 | 448,700 | 725,300 | 1,280,400 |
| Mar | 221,000 | 300,400 | 425,500 | 946,900 | 1,731,800 |
| Apr | 180,000 | 267,700 | 413,400 | 861,100 | 1,634,000 |
| May | 121,000 | 106,300 | 317,300 | 544,600 | 1,339,200 |
| Jun | 108,000 | 142,800 | 166,000 | 416,800 | 1,106,000 |
| Jul | 83,000 | 249,400 | 161,000 | 493,400 | 1,206,300 |
| Aug | 66,000 | 398,500 | 275,000 | 739,500 | 1,1717,100 |
| Sep | 25,000 | 295,600 | 81,100 | 401,700 | 1,537,400 |
| Jan-Sep | 957,600 | 2,176,500 | 2,850,600 | 5,984,700 | 12,788,200 |
| 1925 | 1,835,923 | 4,359,824 | 3,830,064 | 10,025,811 | 19,022,214 |
| Apr 1926 | 240,000 | | | | |
| May 1926 | 192,000 | | | | |
| Apr 1927 | 354,726 | | | | |
| May 1927 | 393,619 | | | | |
| 1930 | 5,671,390 | | | | |

== See also ==
- Assignment: Venezuela (related propaganda film from 1956)

| 1922 | 1923 | 1924 | 1925 | 1926 | 1927 | 1928 | 1929 | 1930 | 1931 | 1932 |
|---|---|---|---|---|---|---|---|---|---|---|
| 1 | 3 | 3 | 3 | 11 | 4 | 1 | 6 | 3 | 3 | 5 |

| Location | Name | Spudded | Completed | Depth | Result |
|---|---|---|---|---|---|
| Delta | Paria No. 1 | | Feb 26, 1932 | 5,065ft | abandoned |
| East | Orocual No. 1 | Mar 14, 1932 | May 1, 1932 | 3,924ft | abandoned |
| East | Pirital No. 1 | Jun 11, 1932 | Oct 28, 1932 | 2,723ft | suspended (fishing job); abandoned |
| Falcon | La Vela No. 2 | Jun 6, 1932 | Sep 30, 1932 | 2,822ft | gas blowout (1 dead) |
| East | Pedernales No. 1 | Aug 23, 1932 | Oct 8, 1932 | 3,494ft | abandoned |
