= Lago Petroleum Corporation =

- Industry: Oil exploration and production
- Founded: April 12, 1923
- Founder: George F. Naphen and Joshua S. Cosden
- Defunct: 1943
- Fate: merged with Creole Petroleum Corporation
- Headquarters: Venezuela
- Number of locations: Lake Maracaibo region
- Products: Petroleum

Lago Petroleum Corporation was an oil production company established by Americans in 1923 that exploited the oilfields in Lake Maracaibo. It was acquired by Standard Oil of New Jersey in 1932. Later it was nationalized.

== Ownership ==
Edward L. Doheny, who owned the Pan American Petroleum and Transport Co., controlled the Barco concession in Colombia through a subsidiary. He became interested in Venezuelan oil operations, including a pipeline from Colombia to Venezuela to reduce the cost of exporting the Colombian oil. After meetings between J.A. Coronil and Doheney's staff,

the Lago Petroleum Co. was formed by Preston McGoodwin, Joshua S. Cosden and Payne Whitney Associates, and registered in Delaware on 12 April 1923. British-Mexican Petroleum acquired about 25% of its stock. In 1924 the company took over concessions that had been granted to the British Equatorial Oil Company in addition to properties it had purchased from twenty Venezuelans who had obtained them from General Juan Vicente Gómez, the military ruler of the country.

C. Ledyard Blair's Blair & Co. and Chase Securities sold a controlling stake in Lago to Pan American Petroleum in a complex transaction at the end of 1925. By the late 1920s a trio of foreign-controlled companies were operating in the eastern Lake Maracaibo region. Shell Oil had the Aranguren concession onshore. Gulf Oil had acquired the Creole Syndicate's leases in the strip of shallow water 1.5 kilometres (0.93 mi) wide along the lake shore. Standard of Indiana through Pan American owned Lago's operations in the lake bed. In 1932 Pan American sold its foreign properties to Standard Oil of New Jersey for about $100 million. The deal included Pan American's large oil concessions in Venezuela. Lago Petroleum became a subsidiary of Creole Petroleum Corporation, now the Venezuelan subsidiary of Standard Oil of New Jersey. Included in the sale were the Lago Oil and Transport Company and the Lago Shipping Company, and the finalized plans to build the Lago refinery, "the giant", on Aruba. It later operated under the name Creole Petroleum Company, then under Standard Oil's name, Esso. The company was nationalized with the rest of the Venezuelan petroleum industry in 1976.

== Operations ==
Lago (Note: Lago is Spanish for "lake", as in Lago Maracaibo.) owned about 8,000 square miles (21,000 km^{2}) of land in Lake Maracaibo, and produced about 30,000 barrels of crude oil per day. Oil wells in Lake Maracaibo require drilling platforms. Wooden pilings to support the platforms were vulnerable to teredo worms. Lago Petroleum pioneered use of concrete pilings pre-fitted with steel heads and tied together with steel ropes. Lago's techniques, including use of barges to move heavy equipment around, made the cost of drilling on water lower than that of drilling on land, although taxes and royalties had been set lower by the government on the assumption that costs would be higher. The company did not spend money on exploration, but simply drilled wells into the La Rosa field.

Lago discovered the valuable Tía Juana field in 1928. Standard of Indiana obtained land on Aruba from the Dutch government, built a tanker terminal and refinery there, and started shipping Lago's crude to Aruba in 1925. In 1929 Lago had 129 active wells in the lake. In 1929 nineteen lake tankers carried 37 million barrels of crude to the huge refinery being built at the Aruba terminal. Production was inefficient. Since the three competing companies were draining a common reservoir, each had an interest in extracting oil as quickly as possible, although a more deliberate pace would have given greater total output. At times, hastily built wells collapsed, oil gushed into the lake and caught fire, burning rigs and equipment.

Lago employed Chinese and West Indians as well as Venezuelans, using competition between these groups to keep pay low. The government saw these foreign workers as a source of labor unrest, and in 1929 prohibited further entry of Afro-Caribbean and Chinese workers and demanded that existing workers have a certificate of employment and good conduct. Lago employed about 1,400 workers during the 1930s, mostly based in Lagunillas and La Salina in Zulia State

. In 1939 Lago said its employees included 268 foreigners and 3,119 Venezuelans. Most of the local people were simply day laborers.

== History ==
British Equatorial Oil Co. concessions
Name	Location	Hectares
Navarro	District of Perija	73,133
Caprilles	Monagas	75,000
Mosquera	Monagas	15,000
Garcia	Trujillo and Zulia	131,570
Maritime	Lake Maracaibo (1km shore strip)	9,874

On February 28, 1924 Lago took over the properties, the entire staff and the operation of the British Equatorial Oil Co., which had been active in Venezuela for a few years. This company was in the process of drilling the first two wells in the subsea portion of the La Rosa field: Marine Zone No. 1, 1,500 meters from the famous El Barosso No. 2 (10.3764°N 71.436°W) of Venezuelan Oil Concessions, Ltd (Shell) and Marine Zone No. 2, 800 meters from the La Junta well of VOC. In exchange Equatorial Oil stockholders received $1,000,000 in cash and £452,500 in deferred cash (last installment due October 1, 1926); in addition 100,000 shares of Lago stock and an option for 200,000 shares at $2 per share on or before November 30, 1925. Apparently Lago issued 500,000 shares on February 28, 1924 to finance this acquisition.

The first shipment from the field to the Aruba terminal was made on October 29, 1924. At that time Lago had 4 shallow draft tankers in service, 1 making the transatlantic journey from the United Kingdom and a further 4 being built there. On November 1, 1924 Lago had 3 wells producing an estimated 30,000bpd and 3 being drilled.

Lago struck oil in the Ambrosia "production area", 10km north of La Rosa in July 1925 with Lago Marine No. 1, located 3/8th of a mile offshore at a depth of 1,378ft. In January 1926 both Ambrosia No. 5 (Lago) and Rodriguez No. 2 (Gulf-Creole) struck a flow 15,000bpd at a depth of ca. 1,500ft in the area.

== See also ==
- Lago Colony
- Lake tanker
- Lago Oil and Transport Company
