= 2020 El Palito oil spill =

Oil spill in Venezuela

El Palito oil spill
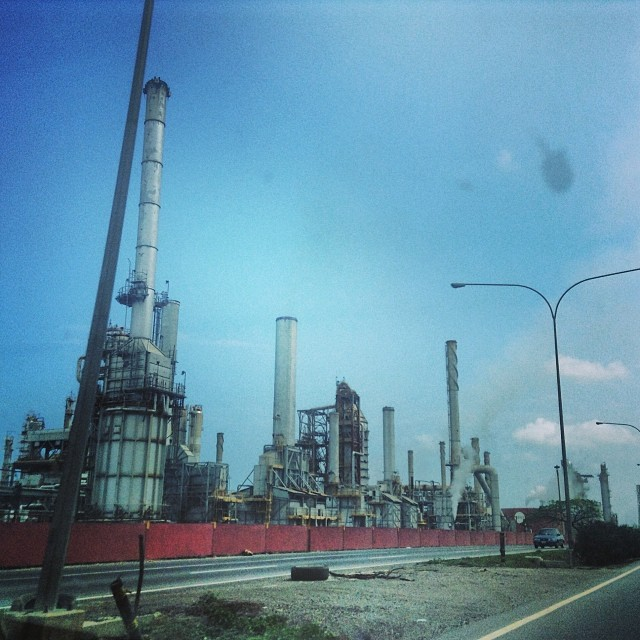
- El Palito refinery, where the spill occurred
- Interactive map of El Palito oil spill
- Location: El Palito refinery, Carabobo state, Venezuela
- Coordinates: 10.499°N 68.129°W
- Date: July 2020

Cause
- Operator: Petróleos de Venezuela

The El Palito oil spill was an oil spill that occurred at the El Palito refinery, Venezuela, in July 2020.

== Oil spill ==
The spill was estimated to be 25 thousand oil barrels into the Triste Gulf due to malfunctions in the cooler of the heat exchanger systems that use seawater to lower the pressure. In an attempt to double production from 20,000 to 40,000 daily oil barrels to 61,500 at the catalytic cracking and 87,500 bpd at the distillation tower, "multiple leaks" developed. The refinery had been unable to produce gasoline for several weeks. Experts argue that this was the tenth shutdown of the refinery in three months. The spill reached the eastern coast of Falcón State and Morrocoy National Park.

== Aftermath ==
Another spill occurred in February 2021.

== See also ==
- 2023 El Palito oil spill
- Environmental issues in Venezuela
- MV Wakashio oil spill
- Amuay tragedy
- Orinoco Mining Arc
