= El Palito refinery =

Oil refinery in Venezuela

Coordinates: 10.481°N 68.123°W

El Palito refinery is a hydrocarbon refining complex located in the municipality of Puerto Cabello, near the town of El Palito in the state of Carabobo, Venezuela. Controlled by the state-owned oil company PDVSA, it has a refining capacity of 140,000 barrels per day, making it the fourth largest refinery in the country after the Paraguaná (940,000 barrels), Puerto La Cruz refinery (200,000 barrels), and José (180,000 barrels) refineries.

== History ==
Construction of the complex began in 1954. Refining operations commenced on June 23, 1960, with an initial refining capacity of 55,000 barrels per day.

A lightning strike caused a fire at the refinery in September 2012.

Production reached 140,000 barrels per day in 2013. The refinery's capacity was expected to reach 280,000 barrels per day in 2017.

In July 2020 an oil spill occurred at the refinery, estimated to have resulted in 20 thousand oil barrels polluting the Triste Gulf.

In May 2022, a €110 million contract was signed for the refurbishment of El Palito with an Iranian state-owned company, the National Iranian Oil Refining and Distribution Company, NIORDC.

Fuel production reached El Palito's maximum capacity of 140,000 b/d in June 2023.

In June 2023, the CEO of the National Iranian Oil Engineering and Construction Company, NIOEC, a subsidiary of NIORDC, estimated that the El Palito refurbishment was 70% complete.

In late December 2023 an oil spill on the coast of the Carabobo state from the refinery occurred, affecting the beach of Puerto Cabello.

The refinery became the subject of political commentary in 2004 and 2023 due to concerns over underproduction.

In July 2024, catalysts imported from Iran were being used in the El Palito cracking unit, according to the CEO of NIORDC.
