= 2023 El Palito oil spill =

Oil spill in Venezuela

El Palito oil spill
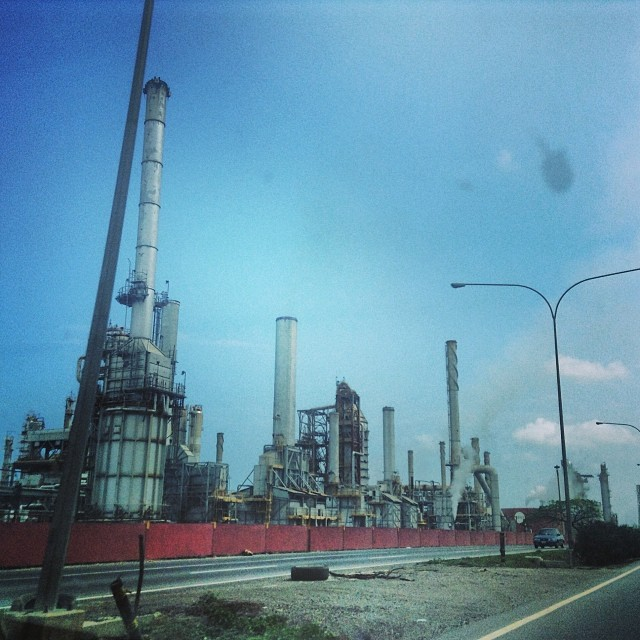
- El Palito refinery, where the spill occurred
- Location: El Palito refinery, Carabobo Carabobo state, Venezuela
- Date: December 2023

Cause
- Operator: Petróleos de Venezuela

An oil spill occurred December 2023 at the El Palito refinery in Puerto Cabello, Venezuela.

== Background ==
In Venezuela, Peurto Cabello, El Palito Refinery is the oldest and smallest refining complexes, operated by Petroleos de Venezuela (PDVSA). The Refinery has a production capacity of 146,000 barrels per day (bpd). In recent years, multiple oil spills have been linked to the facility, including incidents from 2020, 2021, 2023 and 2024. These spills are predominantly due to poor infrastructure and inconsistent maintenance, raising concerns about pollution and ecological damage.

== Spill ==
The oil spill occurred at the end of December 2023 on the coast of the Carabobo state, affecting the beach of Puerto Cabello. Days later, the National Union of Press Workers (SNTP) denounced that officials of the General Directorate of Military Counterintelligence (DGCIM) had prohibited the reporting of the incident.

== Government and industry response ==
PDVSA released a statement in 2016 that it would stop publicly reporting oil spills, despite pressure from NGOs and local communities. PDVSA attributed the spill to an overflow of rainfall into the lagoons, which led to a discharge of hydrocarbons and wastewater into the coastal marine environments.

== Environmental and social impact ==
The impact of the spill contaminated many coastal areas, including Puerto Cabello and Morrocoy National Park, a protected region known for its beaches, mangroves and marine biodiversity. Pollution from the spill led to a temporary halt in fishing, leaving small-scale fishermen without income and disrupting tourism, an essential component for this region. Local NGOs, including Ambientalistas, and the National Organization for Rescue and Maritime Safety of Venezuela’s Aquatic Spaces (ONSA), reported extensive damage to marine ecosystems.

== See also ==
- 2020 El Palito oil spill
- MV Wakashio oil spill
- Amuay tragedy
- Orinoco Mining Arc
