= Agriculture in Venezuela =

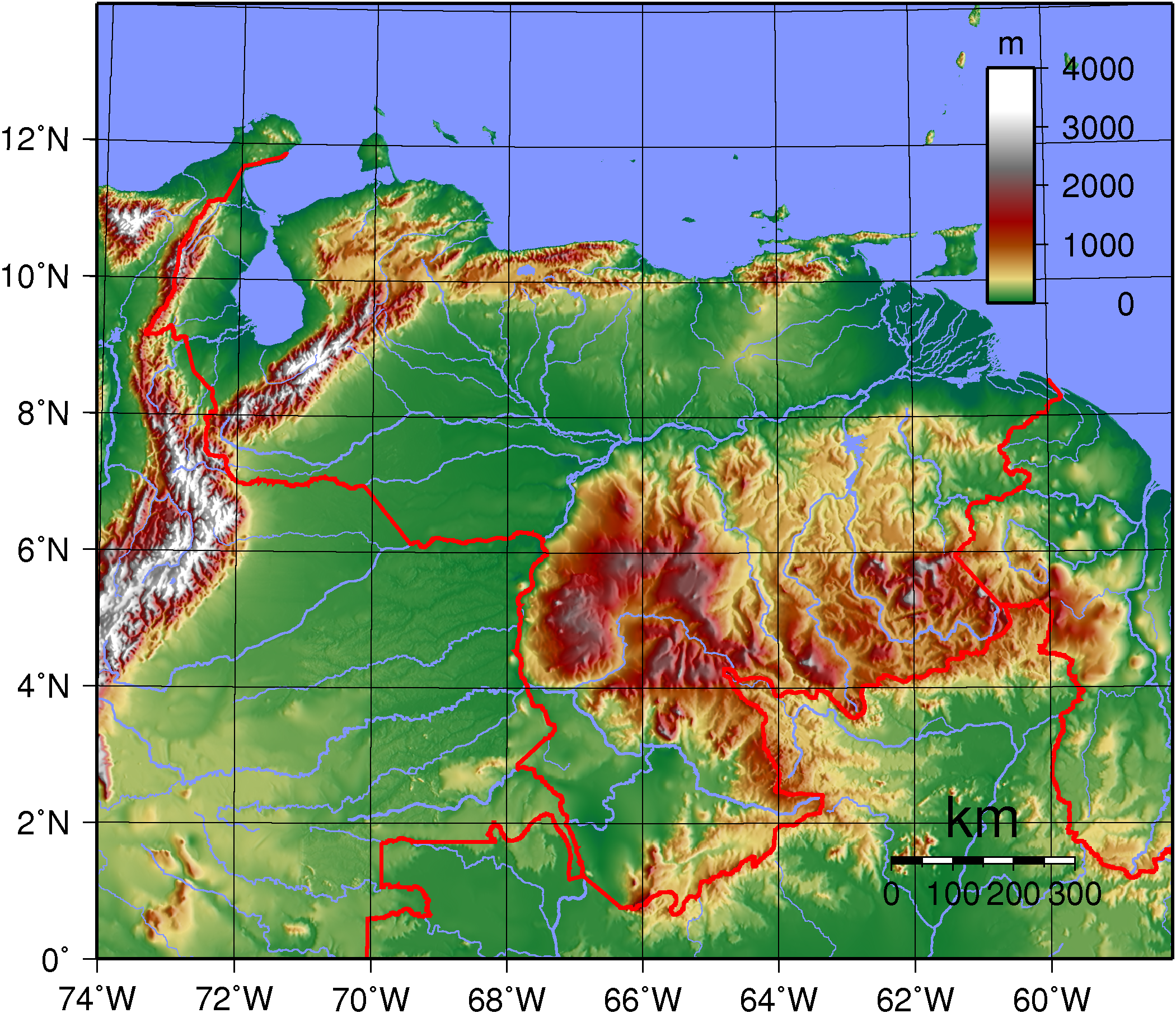
Topography of Venezuela

Agriculture in Venezuela has a much smaller share of the economy than in any other Latin American country. After the discovery of oil in Venezuela in the early 20th century to the 1940s, agriculture has declined rapidly, and with the beginning of large-scale industrial development in the 1940s, agriculture and land reform was largely neglected by successive governments (although a 1960 land reform law did see 200,000 families receive land, largely in the early 1960s). Since 1999, under the Bolivarian Revolution of President Hugo Chávez, agriculture has had a somewhat higher priority. Agriculture in Venezuela accounts for approximately 3% of GDP, 10% of the labor force, and at least a quarter of Venezuela's land area.

Venezuela imports most of its food, mainly from Colombia and the United States.

== History ==
Prior to the 1950s and the initiation of large-scale oil exports, agriculture, fishing, and forestry were central to the Venezuelan economy, producing more than half the gross domestic product (GDP). As late as the 1930s, agriculture still provided 22% of GDP and employed 60% of the labor force. As the petrochemical industry expanded rapidly in the 1970s and 1980s, however, the proportion of the labor force in agriculture dropped from one-fifth to about one-tenth. By 1988 agriculture contributed only 5.9% of GDP, employed 13% of the labor force, and furnished barely 1% of total exports. Agriculture has continued to decline, accounting for about 5% of GDP and 10% of employment in 2004. According to a 1997 government survey, 3.4m hectares of land are suitable for farming (and a further 17.1m hectares suitable for pasture) - but only 0.7m hectares were employed in grain production.

Venezuela saw several attempts at land reform before 1998. During the brief first period of democracy (El Trienio Adeco, 1945–48), the Democratic Action government redistributed land which it said had been gained illicitly by members of previous governments, and in mid-1948 it enacted an agrarian reform law. Most of the land redistributed in this way was returned to its previous owners during the 1948-58 dictatorship of Marcos Pérez Jiménez. After the 1958 restoration of democracy, a new land reform law was enacted in March 1960, with reform in the early 1960s concentrated in the northeastern states of Miranda, Aragua and Carabobo, and coming largely from expropriated private landholdings. The reform was accompanied by a considerable increase in agricultural production. Ultimately the reform saw about 200,000 families receive transfers of land, largely in the early 1960s.

== Bolivarian Revolution ==
Chávez' land reform program has been the subject of criticism from a variety of sources, with farmers said to be lacking sufficient government support, particularly in the case of urban residents moving to the countryside to develop farming cooperatives.

The government has confiscated and expropriated much of the industry, state intervention has seriously damaged the agricultural sector, and Venezuela imports most of its food. There are persistent shortages of common foodstuffs. The government blamed "hoarders" and "speculators" for food shortages.

The government created Misión Agro-Venezuela to support small and medium farm production of the basic foods most commonly consumed in the country.

== Production ==
Venezuela produced in 2019:

- 4.3 million tons of sugarcane;
- 1.9 million tons of maize;
- 1.4 million tons of banana;
- 760 thousand tons of rice;
- 485 thousand tons of pineapple;
- 477 thousand tons of potato;
- 435 thousand tons of palm oil;
- 421 thousand tons of cassava;
- 382 thousand tons of orange;
- 225 thousand tons of watermelon;
- 199 thousand tons of papaya;
- 194 thousand tons of melon;
- 182 thousand tons of tomatoes;
- 155 thousand tons of tangerine;
- 153 thousand tons of coconut;
- 135 thousand tons of avocado;
- 102 thousand tons of mango (including mangosteen and guava);
- 56 thousand tons of coffee;

In addition to smaller productions of other agricultural products. Due to internal economic and political problems, sugar cane production dropped from 7.3 million tons in 2012 to 3.6 million in 2016. Corn production dropped from 2.3 million tons in 2014 to 1, 2 million in 2017. Rice fell from 1.15 million tons in 2014 to 498 thousand tons in 2016.

== See also ==
- Environmental issues in Venezuela
- Water pollution
