= Paraguaná refinery complex =

Oil refinery in Venezuela

Paraguaná Refinery Complex
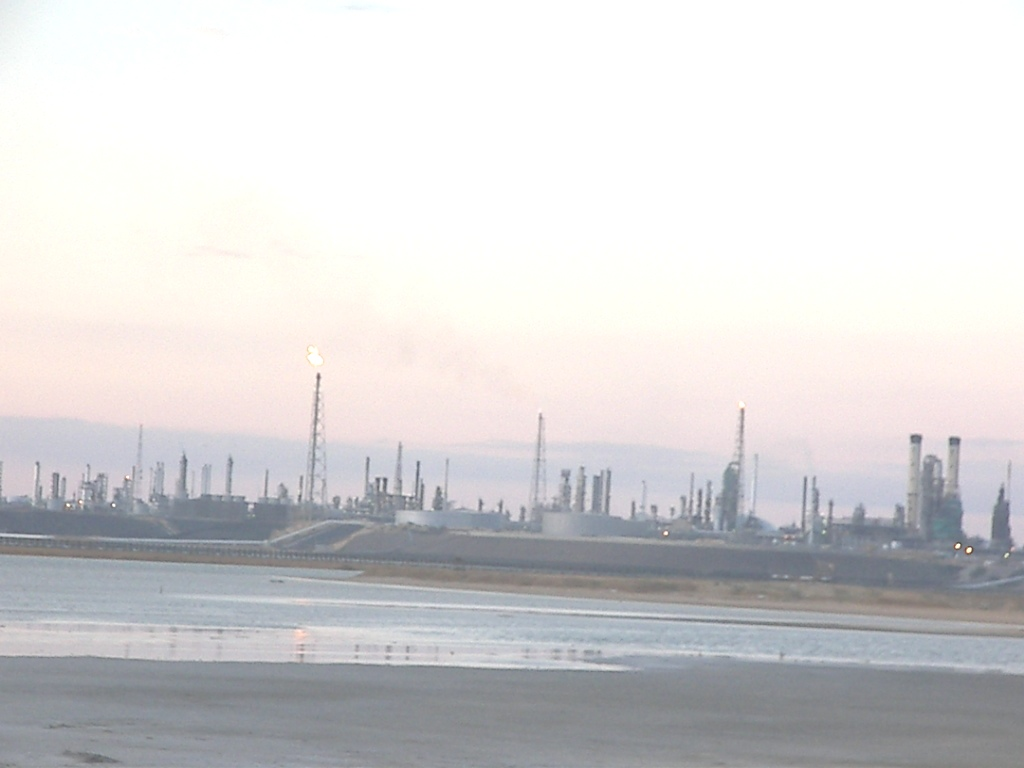
- Amuay Refinery seen from Las Piedras

- Location within Venezuela
- Location: Punto Fijo, Punta Cardón and Maracaibo, Falcón, Venezuela; 11°44′48″N 70°11′42″W

Refinery details
- Operator: Petróleos de Venezuela
- Owner: Petróleos de Venezuela
- Opened: 1949
- Capacity: 940,000 barrels per day (149,000 m^{3}/d)
- Refining units: Amuay Refinery, Cardón Refinery and Bajo Grande Refinery

The Paraguaná Refinery Complex (Spanish: Centro de Refinación de Paraguaná) is a crude oil refinery complex in Venezuela. It is considered the largest refinery in the Western Hemisphere and the world's second largest refinery complex, just after Jamnagar Refinery (India). The Paraguaná Refinery Complex was created by the fusion of Amuay Refinery, Bajo Grande Refinery and Cardón Refinery. The Paraguana Refinery Complex is still the largest refinery in the Western Hemisphere. As of 2012, it refined 955 thousand barrels per day (151,800 m^{3}/d). The complex is located in the Paraguaná Peninsula in Falcón state (Amuay and Cardón refineries) and the western coast of Lake Maracaibo in the Zulia state (Bajo Grande Refinery). The complex accounts for 71% of the refining capacity of Venezuela and it belongs to the state-owned company Petróleos de Venezuela (PDVSA).

== History ==
In 1945, the national government authorized the transnational companies Creole Petroleum Corporation and Shell de Venezuela to build two oil refineries near Punto Fijo, which was decisive for the rise of this city.

The Cardón Refinery of Shell started operations in 1949 with capacity to refine 30 thousand barrels per day (4,800 m^{3}/d). It currently handles 305 thousand barrels per day (48,500 m^{3}/d). The Amuay Refinery was established by Creole Petroleum in 1950. It started having a capacity of 60 thousand barrels per day (9,500 m^{3}/d) and nowadays it can refine 645 thousand barrels per day (102,500 m^{3}/d). The Bajo Grande Refinery, built in 1956 by Richmond (now Chevron), has the capacity to refine 16 thousand barrels per day (2,500 m^{3}/d).

In 1997, a joint venture of BOC and Foster Wheeler built a 50 million cubic feet per day (1.4×10^{6} m^{3}/d) hydrogen production facility next to the Amuay refinery. This hydrogen facility was the largest in South America.

As of 2022 Iranian state firms were negotiating to repair the refinery complex.

== Incidents ==
Since president Hugo Chávez fired 18,000 PDVSA employees and replaced them with avowed loyalists of his own party, PDVSA has suffered from a series of safety and productivity problems.

In 2003, two workers were injured in an explosion at an electrical substation at the Amuay refinery. In 2005, six accidents happened, including an explosion in November 2005, which killed five workers and injured 20. In 2006, five accidents happened which killed three and injured five workers. In the same year, the 54,000-barrel-per-day (8,600 m^{3}/d) catalytic reformer unit was temporarily shut down due to a fire in a furnace 'blew out'.

In March 2011, a fire that broke out at the hydrodesulphurization unit 4 (HD4) of Amuay refinery; however, the fire was out shortly and the refinery continued operating. In 2012, a distillation unit of the Amuay refinery was briefly stopped due to fire. In March 2012, the Cardón refinery was shut for 8 hours due to air supply fault.

=== 2012 explosion ===
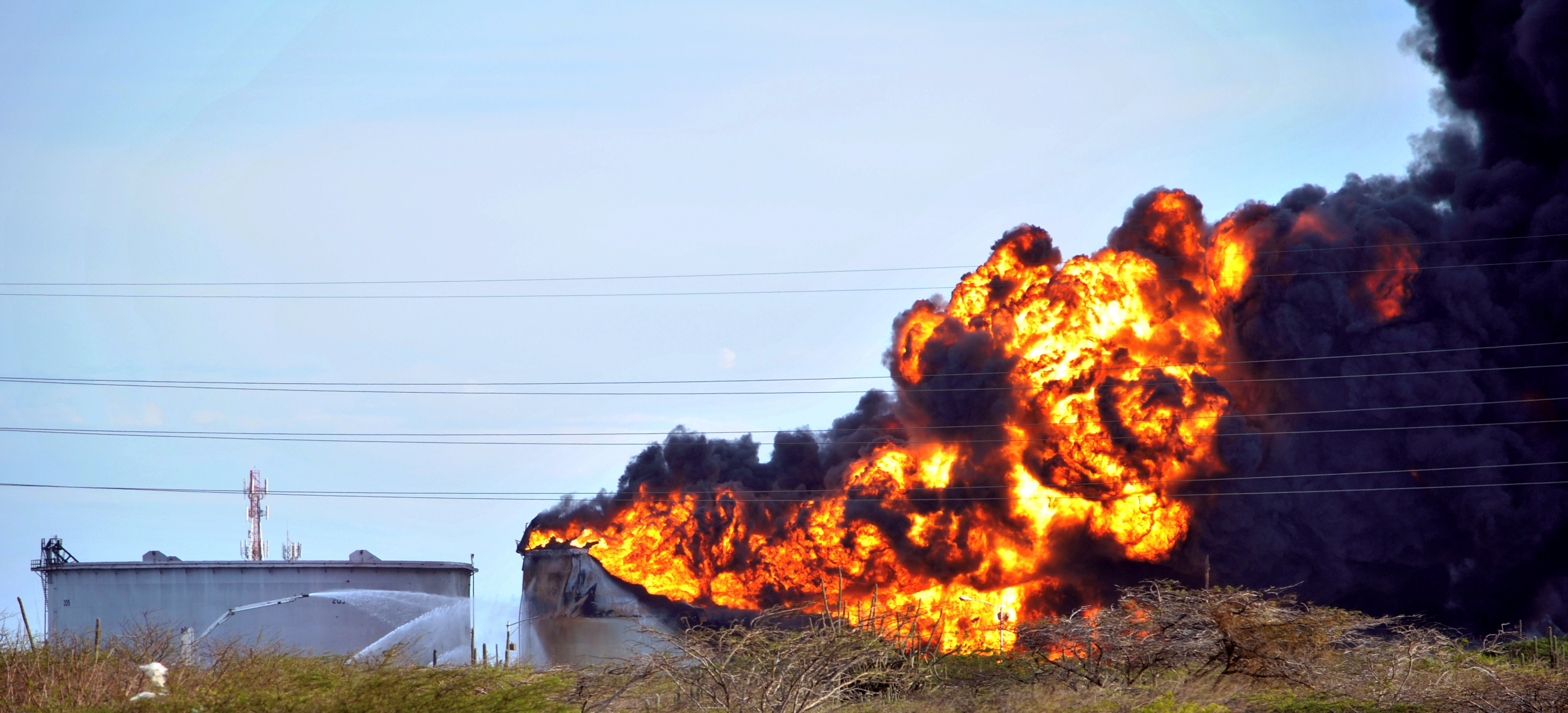
Oil tank burning after the 2012 Amuay refinery explosion.

On 25 August 2012 at 01:11 (05:41 GMT), an explosion caused by the ignition of a leaking gas at the Amuay refinery killed 48 people, primarily National Guard troops stationed at the plant, and injured 151 others. A 10-year-old boy was among the dead. Three days of national mourning was declared by President Hugo Chávez. He also ordered a probe into the cause of the fire and told his cabinet by telephone that "[this] affects us all, the great Venezuelan family, civilian and military. It's very sad, very painful."

According to PDVSA Vice-President Eulogio Del Pino a leak of propane and butane gas was detected an hour before the blast. However, the contingency plan was not implemented. No operating units were reported damaged by the blast but three storage tanks were burning. All three burning storage tanks were extinguished by 28 August 2012.

In addition to the refinery, more than 1,600 homes were damaged by the shockwave. President Chávez said he was creating a US$23 million fund for clean-up operations and a replacement of destroyed homes. He said that "60 new homes were ready for affected families to move into, 60 more would be finished soon, and a further 137 houses would be handed over next month." He also rejected claims that PDVSA might be responsible for the disaster.

According to president Chávez, the plan was to restart the facility by 31 August. Energy Minister Rafael Ramírez said that PDVSA had ten days' production stockpiled and production at other facilities could be increased, and there would be no "major effects" on oil exports. Pricing of gasoline futures in the United States increased by 3.15% due to the incident and threat of Hurricane Isaac.

Venezuelan presidential candidate Henrique Capriles Radonski criticized PDVSA management for their poor safety record and forwarded lack of maintenance as a cause of the accident. President Chávez, who claimed that it was too early to identify the cause, as well as minister Ramírez, said that Capriles did not "know what he's talking about". However, the Secretary-General of the United Federation of Oil Workers Iván Freites blamed the government for a "lack of maintenance and investment" in the oil industry and stated these as the main causes of the incident. He recalled that the union has complained since 2011 about problems with damaged equipment, lack of spare parts and other unsafe conditions.

== Locations ==
Name	Coordinates
Amuay Refinery	11°44′27″N 70°12′33″W
Cardón Refinery	11°38′02″N 70°13′15″W
Bajo Grande Refinery	10°30′16″N 71°38′21″W

== See also ==
- List of oil refineries
- PDVSA
- Punto Fijo
