= Venezuela =

Country in South America

Bolivarian Republic of Venezuela República Bolivariana de Venezuela (Spanish)
- Flag Coat of arms
- Motto: Dios y Federación "God and Federation"
- Anthem: Gloria al Bravo Pueblo "Glory to the Brave People"
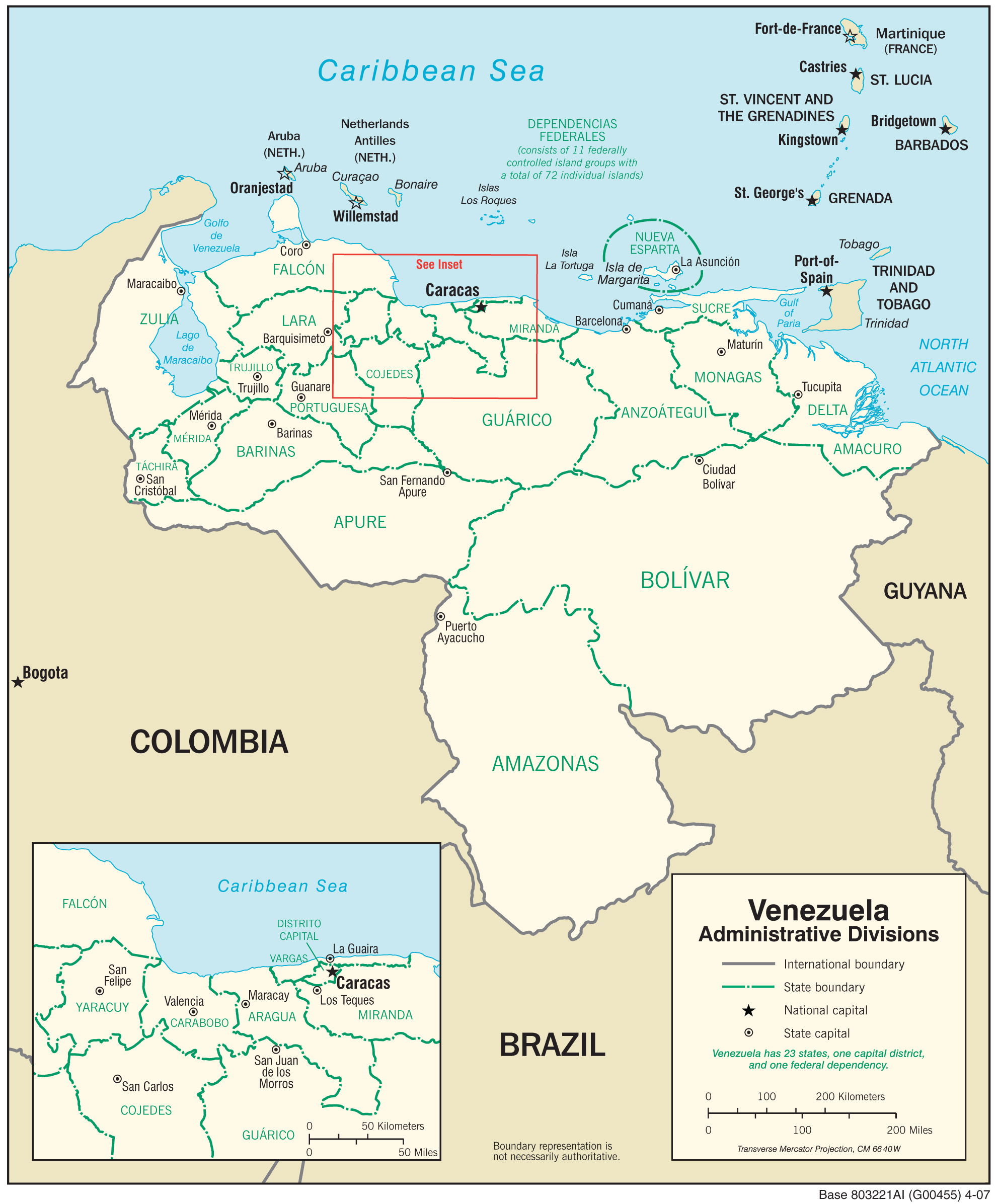
- Location of Venezuela Territory claimed but not controlled
- Capital and largest city: Caracas; 10°30′22″N 66°54′52″W
- Official languages: Spanish^{[b]}
- Recognized regional languages: 26 languages: Piapoco; Baniwa; Locono; Wayúu; Warao; Pemón; Panare; Yek'uana; Yukpa; Carib; Akawaio; Japrería; Mapoyo; Yawarana; Hodï; Puinave; Jivi; Barí; Uruak; Sapé; Pumé; Piaroa; Yanomamö; Sanemá; Yanam; Yeral
- Ethnic groups (2011): 51.6% Moreno; 43.6% White; 3.6% Black; 1.2% other
- Religion (2024): 80% Christianity; 72% Catholicism; 8% Protestantism; 14% no religion; 6% other
- Demonym: Venezuelan
- Government: Federal presidential republic under an authoritarian dictatorship
  - President: Delcy Rodríguez (interim) (Note: Following the 2026 United States strikes in Venezuela, in which president Nicolás Maduro was captured by and taken to the United States, Rodríguez was appointed acting president by order of the Supreme Tribunal of Justice, having already served in a de facto capacity in the immediate aftermath of Maduro's capture. Both Rodríguez and Maduro have asserted that the latter remains the legal officeholder. Some sources have alleged that the country has been under the effective indirect control of U.S. Secretary of State Marco Rubio since the operation.)
  - Vice President: Vacant
- Legislature: National Assembly

Independence from Spain
  - Declared: 5 July 1811
  - from Gran Colombia: 13 January 1830
  - Recognized: 29 March 1845
  - Current constitution: 20 December 1999

Area
  - Total: 916,445 km^{2} (353,841 sq mi) (32nd)
  - Water (%): 3.2%^{[d]}

Population
  - 2025 estimate: ▲31,800,000 (53rd)
  - Density: 32/km^{2} (82.9/sq mi) (184th)
- GDP (PPP): 2026 estimate
  - Total: ▲$282.366 billion (77th)
  - Per capita: ▲$9,902 (133rd)
- GDP (nominal): 2026 estimate
  - Total: ▲$124.184 billion (69th)
  - Per capita: ▲$4,355 (127th)
- Gini (2013): ▲44.8 medium inequality
- HDI (2023): ▲0.709 high (121st)
- Currency: Venezuelan bolívar (VED) (official)
- Time zone: UTC−04:00 (VET)
- Date format: dd/mm/yyyy (CE)
- Calling code: +58
- ISO 3166 code: VE
- Internet TLD: .ve
- 1. The "Bolivarian Republic of Venezuela" has been the full official title since the adoption of the Constitution of 1999, when the state was renamed in honor of Simón Bolívar.; 2. The Constitution also recognizes all Indigenous languages spoken in the country.; 3. Some important subgroups include those of Spanish, Portuguese, Italian, Amerindian, African, Arab and German descent.; 4. Area totals include only Venezuelan-administered territory.; 5. On 1 October 2021, a new bolivar was introduced, the Bolívar digital (ISO 4217 code VED) worth 1,000,000 VES.

Venezuela, (Note: English: /ˌvɛnəˈzweɪlə/ VEN-ə-ZWAY-lə; Latin American Spanish: [beneˈswela].) officially the Bolivarian Republic of Venezuela, (Note: Spanish: República Bolivariana de Venezuela.) is a country on the northern coast of South America, consisting of a continental landmass and various islands and islets in the Caribbean Sea. It comprises an area of 912,050 km^{2} (352,140 sq mi), with a population estimated at 31.8 million in 2025. The capital and largest urban agglomeration is Caracas. The continental territory is bordered on the north by the Caribbean Sea and the Atlantic Ocean, on the west by Colombia, on the south by Brazil, on the east by Guyana, and on the northeast by Trinidad and Tobago. Venezuela consists of 23 states, the Capital District, and the Federal Dependencies covering Venezuela's offshore islands. Venezuela is among the most urbanized countries in Latin America, with an estimated urbanization rate of 88.4% in 2022. The vast majority of Venezuelans live in urban areas in the north, including in the capital.

The territory of Venezuela was colonized by Spain in 1522, amid resistance from Indigenous peoples. In 1811, it became one of the first Spanish American territories to declare independence from the Spanish and to form part of the first federal Republic of Colombia (Gran Colombia). It separated as a fully sovereign country in 1830. During the 19th century, Venezuela suffered political turmoil and autocracy, remaining dominated by regional military dictators until the mid-20th century. From 1958, the country had a series of democratic governments, as an exception where most of the region was ruled by military dictatorships, and the period was characterized by economic prosperity. Economic shocks in the 1980s and 1990s led to major political crises and widespread social unrest, including the deadly Caracazo riots of 1989, two attempted coups in 1992, and the impeachment of a president for embezzlement of public funds charges in 1993. Confidence in the existing political parties collapsed during the 1998 Venezuelan presidential election, in which Hugo Chávez was elected and which became the catalyst for the Bolivarian Revolution. During the 1999 Constituent Assembly, a new Constitution of Venezuela was written and ratified.

The government's populist and social welfare policies were temporarily bolstered by soaring oil prices, temporarily increasing social spending and reducing economic inequality and poverty in the early years of the Chávez government. Poverty began to rapidly increase, however, in mid- to late 2014. The 2013, 2018 and 2024 presidential elections were all widely disputed, with opposition candidates being arrested or exiled. This led to widespread protest and international condemnation, which triggered another nationwide crisis. In 2026, U.S. forces captured Maduro and Vice President Delcy Rodríguez was sworn in as acting president. Since this intervention, the country has been described as a puppet state of the U.S. in terms of its finances and domestic policy.

Venezuela is officially a federal presidential republic, but has experienced democratic backsliding into an authoritarian state under the Chávez and Maduro administrations. It ranks poorly on international measurements of freedom of the press, civil liberties, and control of corruption. Venezuela is a developing country, has the world's largest known oil reserves, and has been one of the world's leading exporters of oil. Previously, the country was an underdeveloped exporter of agricultural commodities such as coffee and cocoa, but oil quickly came to dominate exports and government revenues. Venezuela struggles with hyperinflation, shortages of basic goods, unemployment, poverty, disease, high child mortality, malnutrition, environmental issues, severe crime, widespread corruption, and U.S. sanctions which have precipitated the Venezuelan refugee crisis where more than 7.9 million people had fled the country. The crisis in Venezuela has contributed to a rapidly deteriorating human rights situation.

== Etymology ==
According to the most popular and accepted explanation, in 1499, an expedition led by Alonso de Ojeda visited the Venezuelan coast. The stilt houses in the area of Lake Maracaibo reminded the Italian navigator, Amerigo Vespucci, of the city of Venice, Italy, so he named the region Veneziola, or "Little Venice". The Spanish version of Veneziola is Venezuela.

Martín Fernández de Enciso, a member of the Vespucci and Ojeda crew, gives a different account. In his work Summa de geografía, he states that the crew found Indigenous peoples who called themselves the Veneciuela. Thus, the name "Venezuela" may have evolved from the native word.

Previously, the official name was Estado de Venezuela (1830–1856), República de Venezuela (1856–1864), Estados Unidos de Venezuela (1864–1953), and again República de Venezuela (1953–1999).

== History ==
=== Pre-Columbian history ===
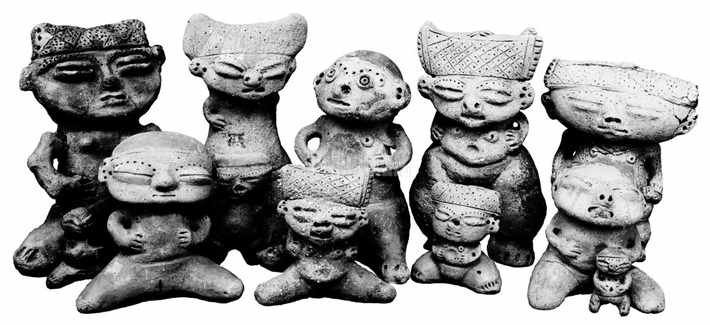
Cult image sculpted in ceramic, Los Roques Archipelago

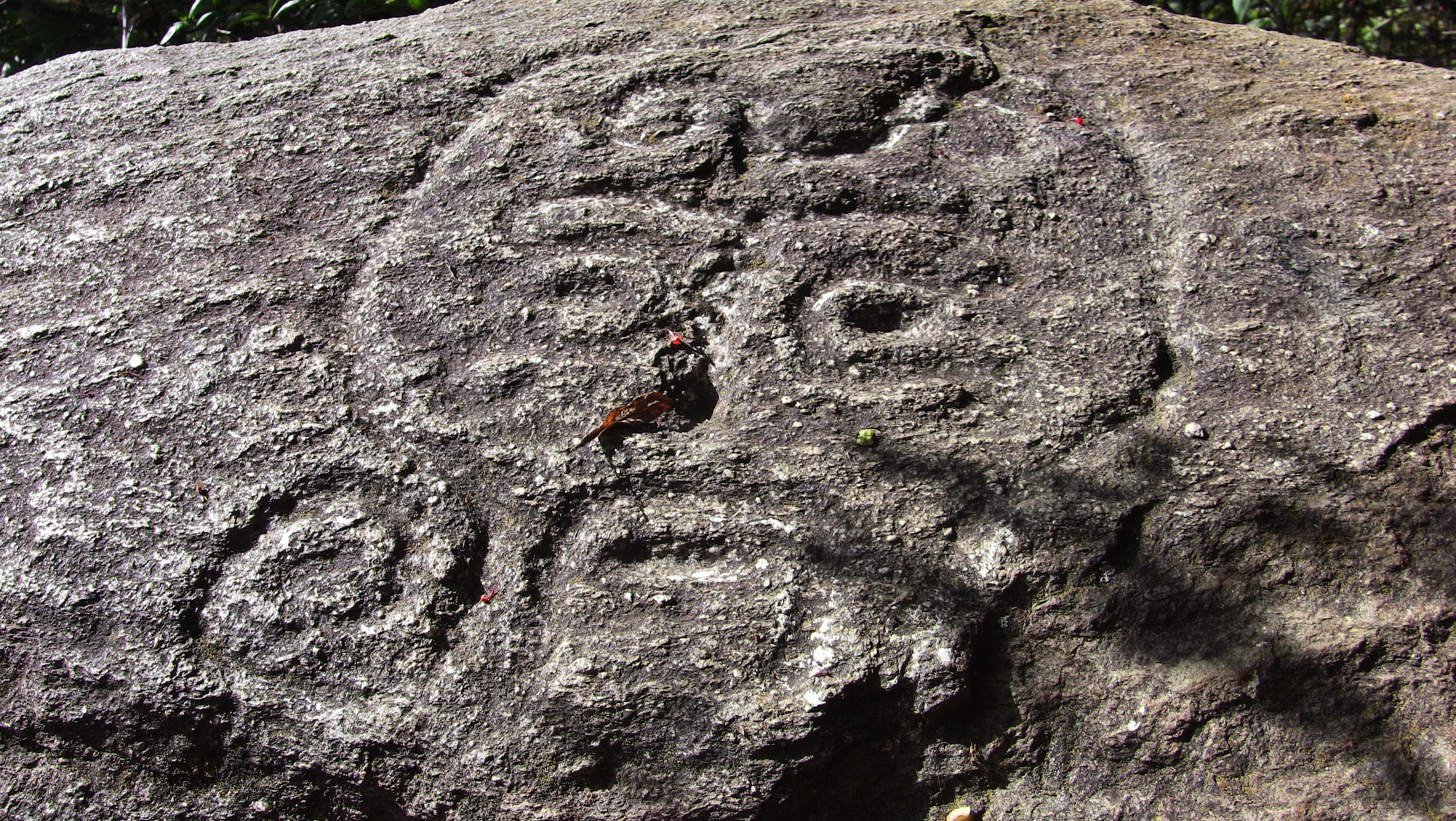
A petroglyph in the Waraira Repano National Park

Evidence exists of human habitation in the area now known as Venezuela from about 15,000 years ago. Tools have been found on the high riverine terraces of the Rio Pedregal in western Venezuela. Late Pleistocene hunting artifacts, including spear tips, have been found at a similar series of sites in northwestern Venezuela; according to radiocarbon dating, these date from 13,000 to 7,000 BC.

It is estimated that one million people lived in the region before Spanish conquest. In addition to Indigenous peoples known today, the population included groups such as the Kalina (Caribs), Auaké, Caquetio, Mariche, and Timoto–Cuicas. The Timoto–Cuica culture was the most complex society, with planned permanent villages surrounded by irrigated, terraced fields. Houses were made of stone and wood with thatched roofs. They were peaceful and depended on growing crops. Regional crops included potatoes and ullucos. They left behind art, particularly anthropomorphic ceramics, but no major monuments. They spun vegetable fibers to weave into textiles and mats for housing. They are credited with having invented the arepa, a staple in Venezuelan cuisine.

After the conquest, the population dropped markedly, mainly through the spread of infectious diseases from Europe. Two main north–south axes of pre-Columbian population were present, who cultivated maize in the west and manioc in the east. Large parts of the llanos were cultivated through a combination of slash and burn and permanent settled agriculture.

=== Colonization ===
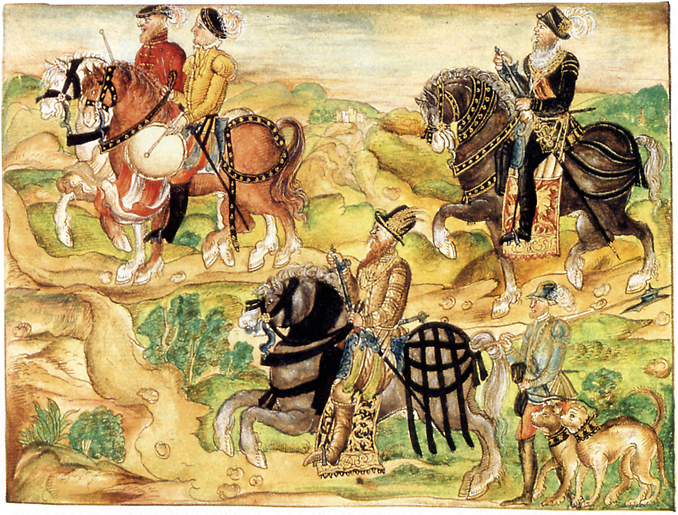
The German Welser Armada exploring Venezuela, German Welsers ruled Venezuela from 1528 to 1546, before it was retaken by the Spanish Empire. Painting of 1560 by Hieronymus Köler.

In 1498, during his third voyage to the Americas, Christopher Columbus sailed near the Orinoco Delta and landed in the Gulf of Paria. Amazed by the great offshore current of freshwater which deflected his course eastward, Columbus expressed in a letter to Isabella and Ferdinand that he must have reached Heaven on Earth (terrestrial paradise):

Great signs are these of the Terrestrial Paradise... for I have never read or heard of such a large quantity of fresh water being inside and in such close proximity to salt water; the very mild temperateness also corroborates this; and if the water of which I speak does not proceed from Paradise then it is an even greater marvel, because I do not believe such a large and deep river has ever been known to exist in this world.

Spain's colonization of mainland Venezuela started in 1522, establishing its first permanent South American settlement in the present-day city of Cumaná.

==== German colonization ====
In the 16th century, the king of Spain granted a concession to the German Welser family. Klein-Venedig (Note: "Little Venice"; additionally the etymology of the name "Venezuela") became the most extensive initiative in the German colonization of the Americas from 1528 to 1546. The Welsers were bankers to the Habsburgs and financiers of Charles V, Holy Roman Emperor, who was king of Spain and had borrowed heavily from them to pay bribes for his imperial election. In 1528, Charles V granted the Welsers the right to explore, rule and colonize the territory, as well as to seek the mythical golden town of El Dorado.

The first expedition was led by Ambrosius Ehinger, who established Maracaibo in 1529. After the deaths of first Ehinger in 1533 then Nikolaus Federmann, and Georg von Speyer in 1540, Philipp von Hutten persisted in exploring the interior. In absence of von Hutten from the capital of the province, the crown of Spain claimed the right to appoint a governor. On Hutten's return to the capital Santa Ana de Coro in 1546, the Spanish governor Juan de Carvajal had Hutten and Bartholomeus VI. Welser executed. Subsequently, Charles V revoked the Welser family concession. The Welsers transported German miners to the colony, in addition to 4,000 African slaves to plant sugar cane plantations. Many German colonists died through wars with the Indigenous inhabitants or from tropical diseases.

=== 16th to 18th century ===
16th century native caciques (leaders) Guaicaipuro and Tamanaco attempted to resist Spanish incursions, but the newcomers ultimately subdued them. In the 16th century Indigenous peoples such as the Mariche people converted to Roman Catholicism. Some resisting tribes or leaders are commemorated in place names, including Caracas, Chacao and Los Teques. The early colonial settlements focused on the northern coast, but in the mid-18th century, the Spanish pushed farther inland along the Orinoco River. Here, the Ye'kuana organized resistance in 1775–76.

Spain's eastern Venezuelan settlements were incorporated into New Andalusia Province. Administered by the Royal Audiencia of Santo Domingo from the early 16th century, most of Venezuela became part of the Viceroyalty of New Granada in the early 18th century and was then reorganized as an autonomous Captaincy General starting in 1777. Caracas, founded in the central coastal region in 1567, was well-placed to become a key location, being near the coastal port of La Guaira and in a valley, in a mountain range, providing defensive strength against pirates and a more fertile and healthy climate.

=== Independence and 19th century ===
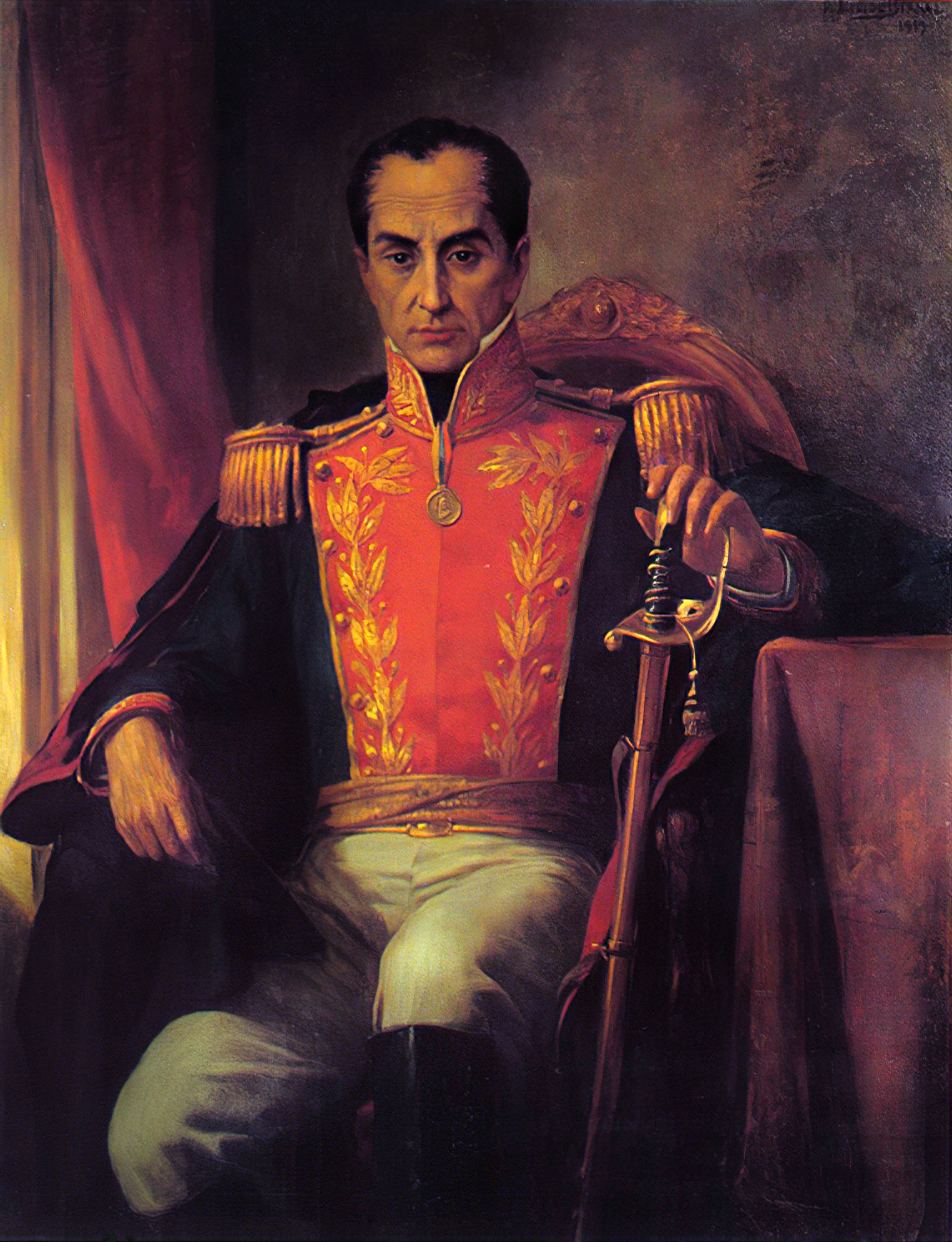
El Libertador, Simón Bolívar

After unsuccessful uprisings, Venezuela under the leadership of Francisco de Miranda, a Venezuelan marshal who had fought in the American and French Revolutions, declared independence as the First Republic of Venezuela on 1811-07-11. This began the Venezuelan War of Independence. A devastating 1812 Caracas earthquake, together with the rebellion of the Venezuelan llaneros, helped bring down the republic. Simón Bolívar, leader of the independentist forces, launched his Admirable Campaign in 1813 from New Granada, retaking most of the territory and being proclaimed as El Libertador ("The Liberator"). A Second Republic of Venezuela was proclaimed on 7 August 1813, but lasted only a few months before being crushed by royalist caudillo José Tomás Boves and his personal army of llaneros.

The end of the French invasion of homeland Spain in 1814 allowed a large expeditionary force to come under general Pablo Morillo, with the goal to regain the lost territory in Venezuela and New Granada. As the war reached a stalemate on 1817, Bolívar reestablished the Third Republic of Venezuela on the territory still controlled by the patriots, mainly in the Guayana and Llanos regions. This republic was short-lived as only two years later, during the Congress of Angostura of 1819, the union of Venezuela with New Granada was decreed to form the Republic of Colombia.

The war continued until full victory and sovereignty was attained after the Battle of Carabobo on 24 June 1821. On 24 July 1823, José Prudencio Padilla and Rafael Urdaneta helped seal Venezuelan independence with their victory in the Battle of Lake Maracaibo. New Granada's congress gave Bolívar control of the Granadian army; leading it, he liberated several countries and founded the Republic of Colombia (Gran Colombia).

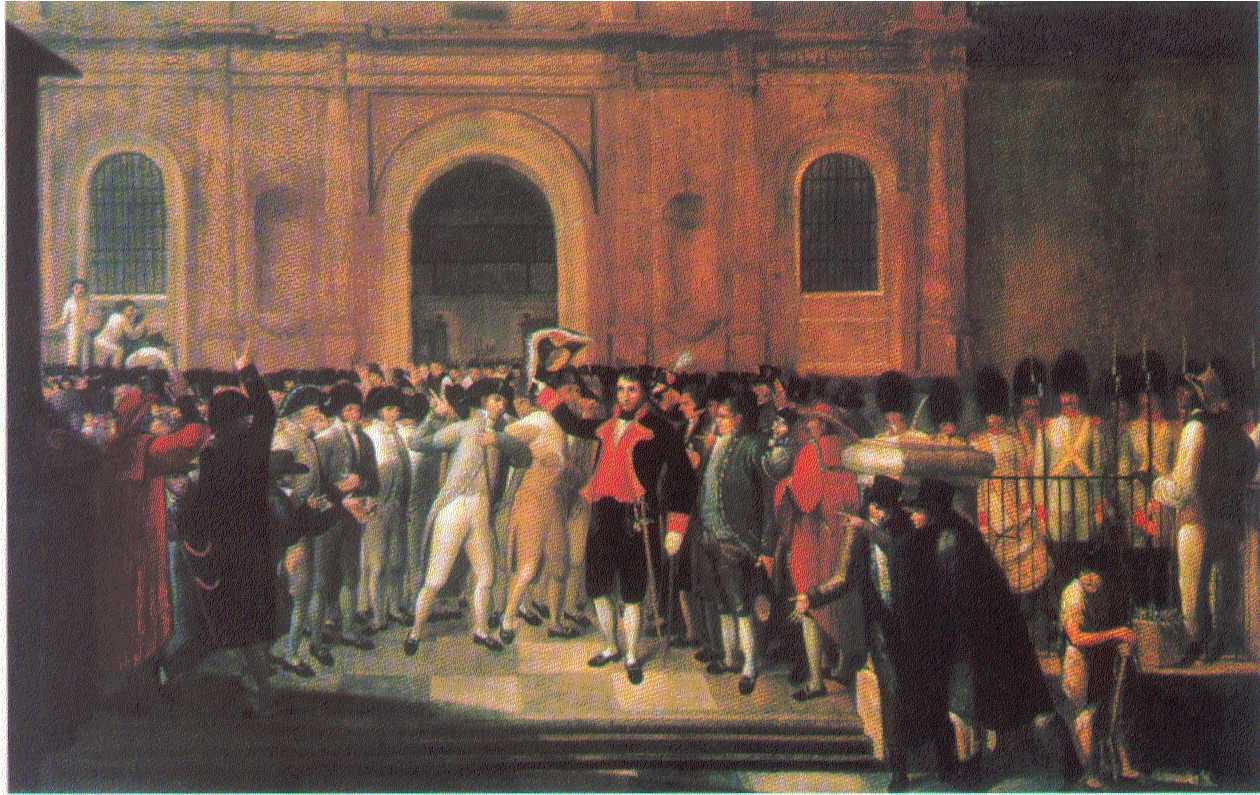
Revolution of 19 April 1810, the beginning of Venezuela's independence, by Martín Tovar y Tovar

Sucre went on to liberate Ecuador and become the second president of Bolivia. Venezuela remained part of Gran Colombia until 1830, when a rebellion led by José Antonio Páez allowed the proclamation of a newly independent Venezuela, on 22 September; Páez became the first president of the State of Venezuela. Between one-quarter and one-third of Venezuela's population was lost during these two decades of war (including about half the Venezuelans of European descent), which by 1830 was estimated at 800,000. In the Flag of Venezuela, the yellow stands for land wealth, the blue for the sea that separates Venezuela from Spain, and the red for the blood shed by the heroes of independence.

Slavery in Venezuela was abolished in 1854. Much of Venezuela's 19th-century history was characterized by political turmoil and dictatorial rule, including the independence leader José Antonio Páez, who gained the presidency three times and served 11 years between 1830 and 1863. This culminated in the Federal War (1859–63). In the latter half of the century, Antonio Guzmán Blanco, another caudillo, served 13 nonconsecutive years, between 1870 and 1887, with three other presidents interspersed.

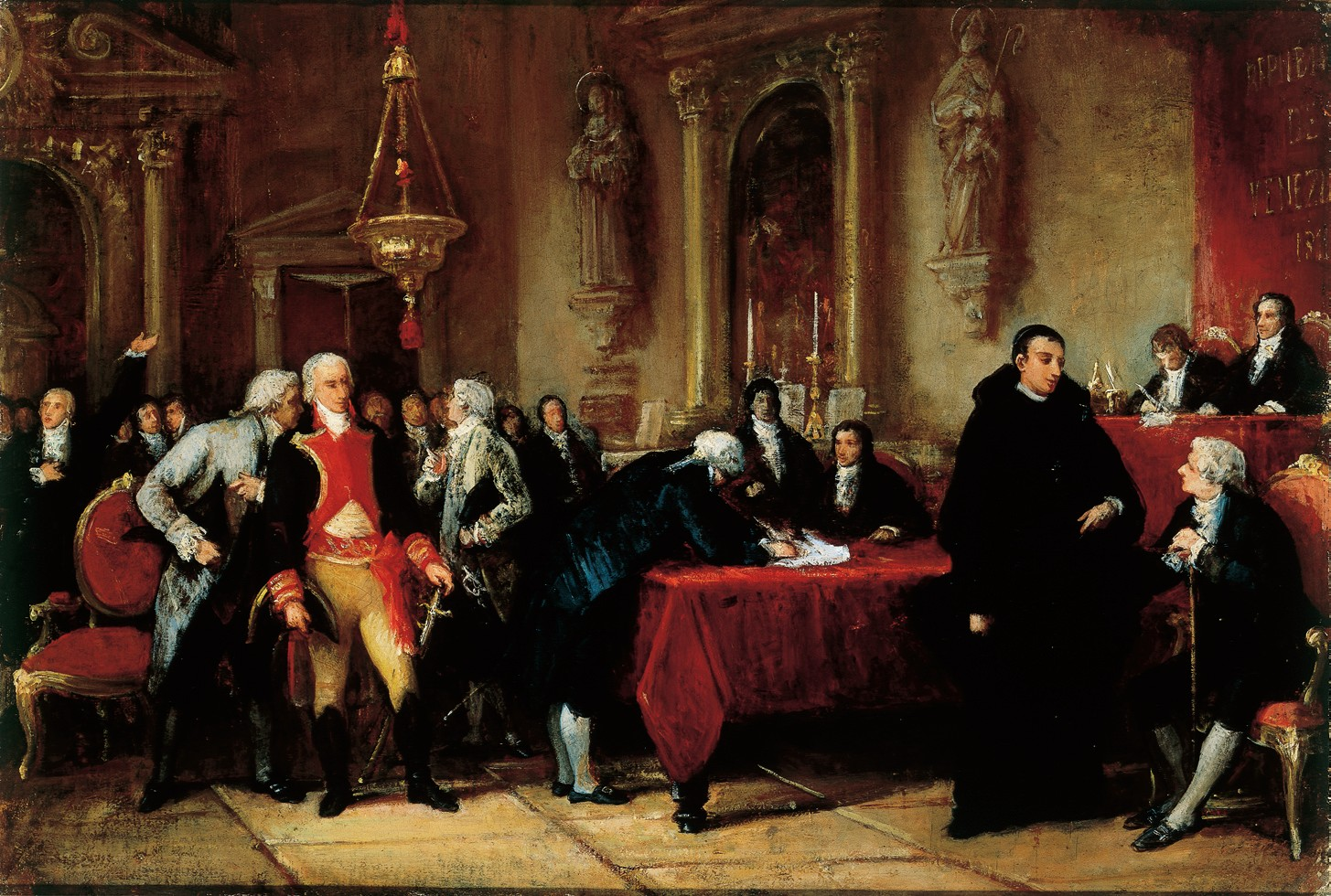
The signing of Venezuela's independence, by Martín Tovar y Tovar

In 1895, a longstanding dispute with Great Britain about the Essequibo territory, which Britain claimed as part of British Guiana and Venezuela saw as Venezuelan territory, erupted into the Venezuela crisis of 1895. The dispute became a diplomatic crisis when Venezuela's lobbyist, William L. Scruggs, sought to argue that British behavior over the issue violated the United States' Monroe Doctrine of 1823, and used his influence in Washington, D.C., to pursue the matter. Then, U.S. president Grover Cleveland adopted a broad interpretation of the doctrine that declared an American interest in any matter within the hemisphere. Britain ultimately accepted arbitration, but in negotiations over its terms was able to persuade the U.S. on many details. A tribunal convened in Paris in 1898 to decide the issue and in 1899 awarded the bulk of the disputed territory to British Guiana.

In 1899, Cipriano Castro, assisted by his friend Juan Vicente Gómez, seized power in Caracas. Castro defaulted on Venezuela's considerable foreign debts and declined to pay compensation to foreigners caught up in Venezuela's civil wars. This led to the Venezuela crisis of 1902–1903, in which Britain, Germany and Italy imposed a naval blockade before international arbitration at the Permanent Court of Arbitration was agreed. In 1908, another dispute broke out with the Netherlands, which was resolved when Castro left for medical treatment in Germany and was promptly overthrown by Juan Vicente Gómez, who ruled until 1935.

=== 20th century ===
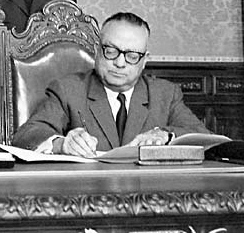
Rómulo Betancourt (president; 1945–1948, 1959–1964), one of the major democratic leaders of Venezuela

The discovery of massive oil deposits in Lake Maracaibo during World War I proved pivotal for Venezuela and transformed its economy from a heavy dependence on agricultural exports. It prompted a boom that lasted into the 1980s; by 1935, Venezuela's per capita gross domestic product was Latin America's highest. Gómez benefited handsomely from this as corruption thrived, but at the same time the new source of income helped him centralize the state and develop its authority.

Gómez remained the most powerful man in Venezuela until his death in 1935. The gomecista dictatorship (1935–45) system largely continued under Eleazar López Contreras but was relaxed from 1941 under Isaías Medina Angarita. Angarita granted a range of reforms, including the legalization of all political parties. After World War II, immigration from southern Europe and poorer Latin American countries markedly diversified Venezuelan society.

In 1945, a civilian-military coup overthrew Angarita and ushered in a period of democratic rule (1945–48) under the mass membership party Democratic Action, initially under Rómulo Betancourt, until Rómulo Gallegos won the 1947 Venezuelan presidential election (the first free and fair elections in Venezuela). Gallegos governed until overthrown by a military junta led by Luis Felipe Llovera Páez, Marcos Pérez Jiménez, and Gallegos' Defense Minister, Carlos Delgado Chalbaud, in the 1948 Venezuelan coup d'état.

The most powerful man in the military junta (1948–58) was Pérez Jiménez; he was suspected of being behind the death of Chalbaud, who died in a bungled kidnapping in 1950. When the junta unexpectedly lost the 1952 presidential election, it ignored the results and Jiménez was installed as president. Jiménez was forced out on 23 January 1958. In an effort to consolidate a young democracy, the three major political parties (Acción Democrática (AD), COPEI and Unión Republicana Democrática (URD), with the notable exception of the Communist Party of Venezuela), signed the Puntofijo Pact power-sharing agreement. AD and COPEI dominated the political landscape for four decades.

During the presidencies of Rómulo Betancourt (1959–64) (Note: His second term.) and Raúl Leoni (1964–69), substantial guerrilla movements occurred. Most laid down their arms under Rafael Caldera's first presidency (1969–74). Caldera had won the 1968 election for COPEI, the first time a party other than AD took the presidency through a democratic election. The new democratic order had its antagonists. Betancourt suffered an attack planned by the Dominican dictator Rafael Trujillo in 1960, and the leftists excluded from the pact initiated an insurgency by organizing themselves into the Armed Forces of National Liberation, sponsored by the Communist Party and Fidel Castro. In 1962 they tried to destabilize the military corps, with failed revolts. Betancourt promoted a foreign policy, the Betancourt Doctrine, in which he only recognized elected governments by popular vote.

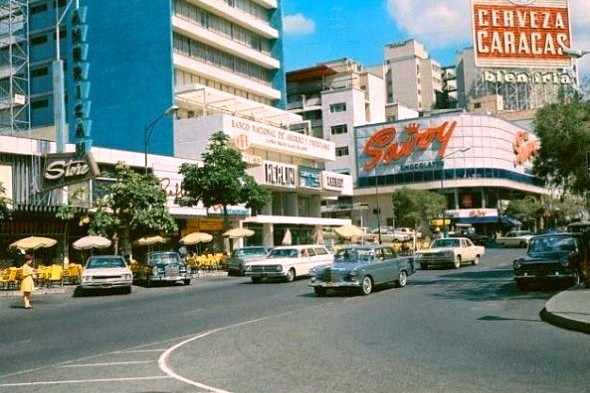
The Sabana Grande district, Caracas, 1973

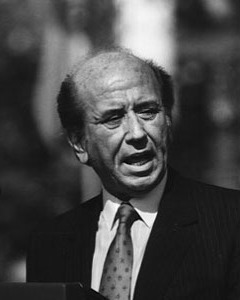
President Carlos Andrés Pérez was impeached on corruption charges in 1993.

The 1973 Venezuelan presidential election of Carlos Andrés Pérez coincided with an oil crisis, in which Venezuela's income exploded as oil prices soared; oil industries were nationalized in 1976. This led to massive increases in public spending but also increases in external debts, until the collapse of oil prices during the 1980s crippled the economy. As the government started to devalue the currency in 1983 to face its financial obligations, standards of living fell dramatically. Failed economic policies and increased corruption in the government led to rising poverty, crime, and political instability, worsening social indicators.

In the 1980s, the Presidential Commission for State Reform (COPRE) emerged as a mechanism of political innovation. Venezuela decentralized its political system and diversified its economy, reducing the size of the state. COPRE operated as an innovation mechanism, also by incorporating issues into the political agenda, that were excluded from public deliberation by the main actors of the democratic system. The most discussed topics were incorporated into the public agenda: decentralization, political participation, municipalization, judicial order reforms and the role of the state in a new economic strategy. The social reality made the changes difficult to apply.

Economic crises in the 1980s and 1990s led to a political crisis. Hundreds of people were killed by security forces and the military in the Caracazo riots of 1989, during the second presidential term of Carlos Andrés Pérez (1989–93) and after the implementation of economic austerity measures. Hugo Chávez, who in 1982 had promised to depose the bipartisanship governments, used the growing anger at economic austerity measures to justify a coup attempt in February 1992; a second coup d'état attempt occurred in November.

Pérez was impeached under embezzlement charges in 1993, leading to the interim presidency of Ramón José Velásquez (1993–94). Coup leader Hugo Chávez was pardoned in March 1994 by President Rafael Caldera (1994–99, during his second term), with a clean slate and his political rights reinstated, allowing Chávez to win and maintain the presidency continuously from 1999 until his death in 2013. Chávez won the elections of 1998, 2000, 2006, and 2012, as well as the presidential referendum of 2004.

=== Bolivarian Venezuela ===
==== Chávez presidency: 1999–2013 ====
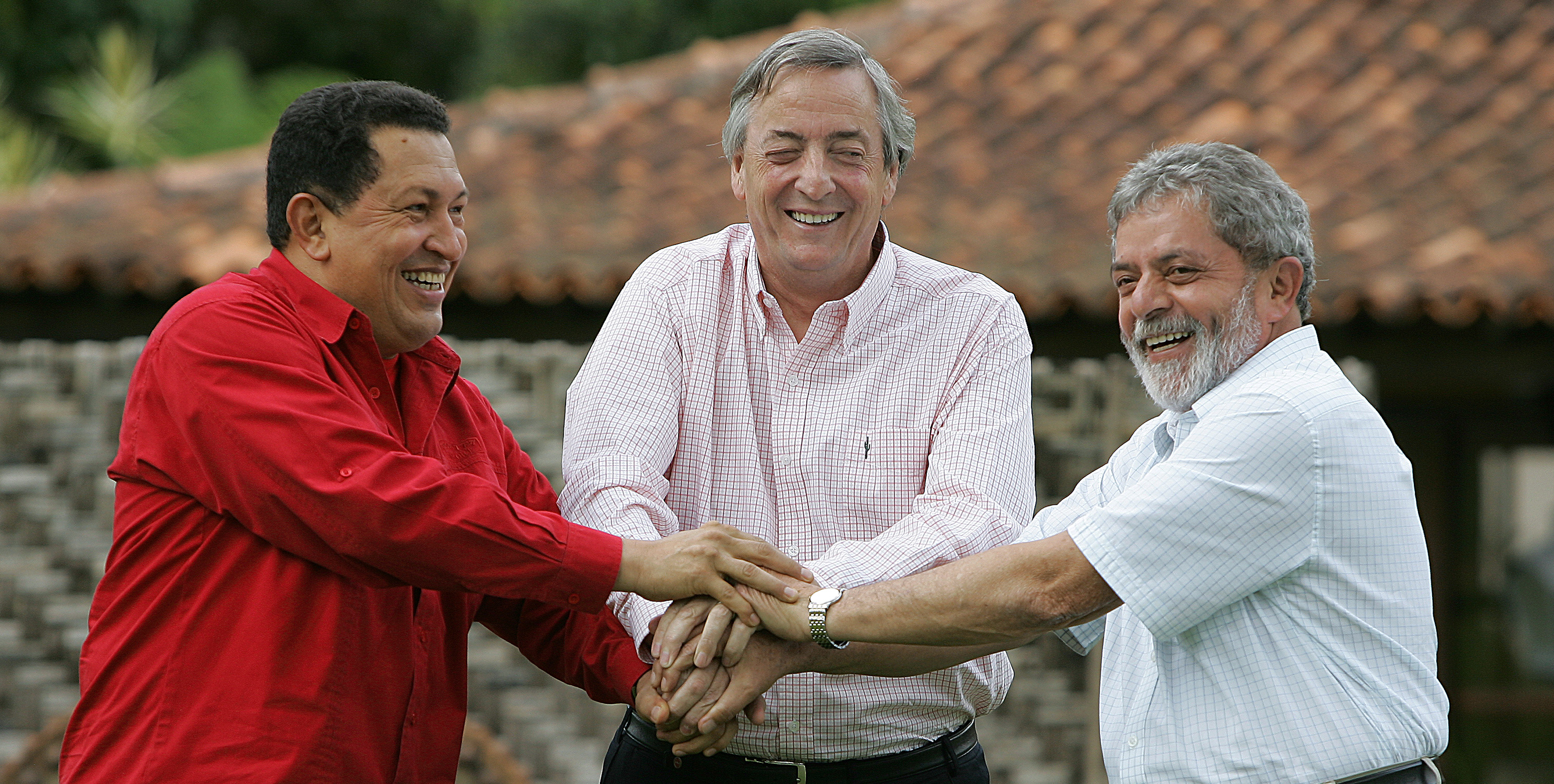
Hugo Chávez with fellow leftist South American presidents Néstor Kirchner of Argentina and Lula da Silva of Brazil

Chávez was elected president in 1998 under a collapse in confidence in the existing parties, which also launched the Bolivarian Revolution, beginning with a 1999 constituent assembly to write a new constitution. The revolution refers to a left-wing populist social movement and political process led by Chávez, who founded the Fifth Republic Movement in 1997 and the United Socialist Party of Venezuela in 2007. The Bolivarian Revolution is named after Simón Bolívar.

Following Chávez's election, Venezuela developed into a dominant-party system, dominated by the United Socialist Party of Venezuela. Chávez was briefly ousted from power in a 2002 Venezuelan coup attempt following demonstrations by his opponents. Efforts by interim president Pedro Carmona to nullify the 1999 constitution and undo Chávez's reforms provoked popular outcry and caused support by the military for the coup to wane. Chávez returned after two days as a result of demonstrations by Chávez supporters and actions by the military. Chávez remained in power after a national strike lasted from December 2002 to February 2003, including a strike/lockout in the state oil company PDVSA. Following the failed coup attempt, Chávez sought to limit the influence of his political opponents by promoting state television and restricting the influence of privately owned media. Chávez survived further political tests, including a 2004 recall referendum. He was elected for another term in December 2006. The first US sanctions against Venezuelan officials were imposed in 2008.

Income inequality declined and Venezuelans' quality of life improved at the third fastest rate worldwide during Chávez's administration. From 2006 to 2011, Venezuela moved up seven spots on the Human Development Index, to 73 out of 187. The poverty rate declined from 48.6% to 29.5% from 2002 to 2011. The economy grew by 95% from 2003 to 2010. Social spending per person tripled, and access to healthcare and education improved. Chávez initiated Bolivarian missions, programs aimed at helping the poor. The missions increased health coverage, improved education and virtually eliminated illiteracy, but failed to meet their housing goals. During Mission Robinson, nearly 1.5 million adults learned to read.

From 2006 to 2013, PDVSA's external debt increased from $3 billion to $35 billion. The economy had become dependent on the exportation of oil, with crude accounting for 86% of exports, and a high price per barrel to support social programs. The reliance of Chávez's socioeconomic policies on oil sales and importing goods resulted in large amounts of debt, no change to corruption in Venezuela and culminated into an economic crisis.

In the subsequent decade, the government was forced into currency devaluations. These devaluations did not improve the situation of the people who rely on imported products or locally produced products that depend on imported inputs, while dollar-denominated oil sales account for the majority of exports. Profits of the oil industry were lost to "social engineering" and corruption, instead of investments needed to maintain oil production.

Chavez was elected to a third term in October 2012, but was not sworn in due to medical complications and his death was officially announced as 5 March 2013.

Nicolás Maduro was picked by Chavez as his successor, appointing him vice president in 2013.

==== Maduro presidency: 2013–2026 ====
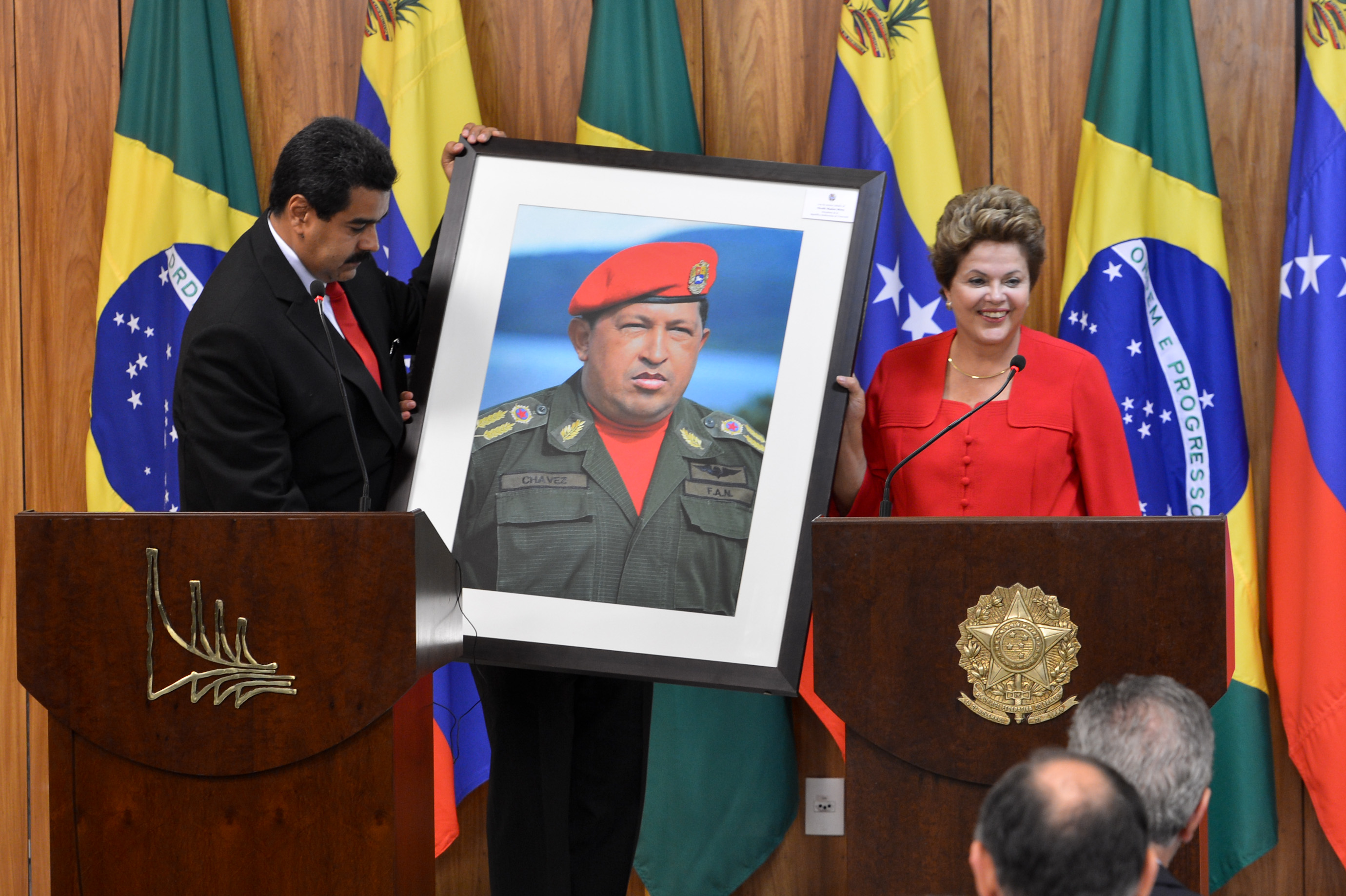
Nicolás Maduro with Brazilian President Dilma Rousseff, 9 May 2013

Maduro became president of Venezuela on 14 April 2013, when he won the presidential election after Chavez' death with 51% of the vote, against Henrique Capriles at 49%. The Democratic Unity Roundtable contested Maduro's election as fraudulent, but an audit of 56% of the vote showed no discrepancies and the Supreme Court of Venezuela ruled Maduro was the legitimate president.

Venezuela's history of devaluation of the hard and sovereign bolívar currency continued and food shortages became widespread.

Since February 2014, hundreds of thousands of Venezuelans have protested over high levels of crime, corruption, hyperinflation, and chronic scarcity of basic goods due to government policies. Demonstrations and riots have resulted in over 40 fatalities in the unrest between Chavistas and opposition protesters and opposition leaders, including the arrests of Leopoldo López and Antonio Ledezma. Human rights groups condemned the arrest of López. In late 2014, US President Barack Obama's administration imposed additional unilateral sanctions on the Venezuelan officials involved in the crackdown on the protests. In the summer of 2015, the Venezuelan military initiated an operation in response to opposition paramilitary attacks on police and civil society establishments. In the 2015 Venezuelan parliamentary election, the opposition gained a two-thirds majority. The opposition sought to reverse many Chavez era laws, such as the nationalization of telecommunications and news broadcasting, and secure amnesty for imprisoned opposition leaders charged with corruption or leading violent protests. It also considered a recall campaign against Maduro, but this was infeasible since 7.5 million new voters had been registered since the last recall effort, increasing the number of signatures needed for a recall election. The first law passed by the opposition granted amnesty from prosecution for offenses committed since January 1999, including participation in the 2002 coup attempt.

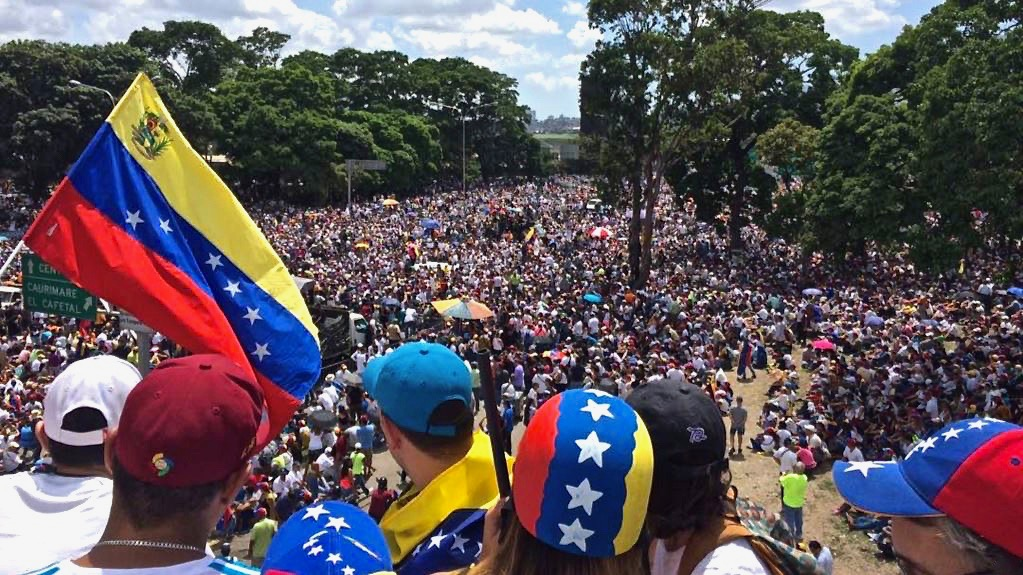
2017 Venezuelan protests

In January 2016, Maduro declared an "economic emergency", revealing the extent of the crisis and expanding his powers. The government established committees to oversee local food distribution, called CLAPs. Government officials blamed economic sabotage by business interests for the economic crisis, citing examples of eggs and milk being destroyed on the orders of business owners. Corruption also played a role, with shortages incentivizing selfish behavior and the exploitation of social programs. Venezuelans, including some Chavistas criticized the government for being too soft on corruption. In July 2016, Colombian border crossings were temporarily opened to allow Venezuelans to purchase food and basic health items. In September 2016, a study indicated 15% of Venezuelans were eating "food waste discarded by commercial establishments". 200 prison riots had occurred by October 2016.

The Maduro-aligned Supreme Tribunal, which had been overturning National Assembly decisions since the opposition took control in 2015, took over the functions of the assembly, creating the 2017 Venezuelan constitutional crisis. In August 2017, the 2017 Constituent National Assembly was elected and stripped the National Assembly of its powers. The election raised concerns of an emerging dictatorship. In December 2017, Maduro declared opposition parties barred from the following year's presidential vote after they boycotted mayoral polls.

In August 2017, US President Donald Trump's administration imposed more economic sanctions against the PDVSA and Venezuelan officials. US sanctions against Venezuela would escalate over the next two years as part of the Trump administration's "maximum pressure" strategy against the Maduro government. Sanctions in 2017 disallowed US citizens from buying Venezuelan debt and blocked dividend payments to US nationals, crippling PDVSA finances. Another round of sanctions in 2018 and 2019 amounted to an embargo on gold, oil, finance, defense and other public and private entities. $22 billion worth of Venezuelan assets held overseas were frozen. The Trump administration pressured non-US entities to reduce their purchases of Venezuelan oil and intimidated European financial institutions into dropping Venezuelan clients. Francisco Rodríguez (Venezuelan economist) said that sanctions were responsible for 59% of the decline in Venezuelan oil production after August 2017. Sanctions have resulted in international banks blocking payments for medicines, fearing retribution from the US Office of Foreign Assets Control.

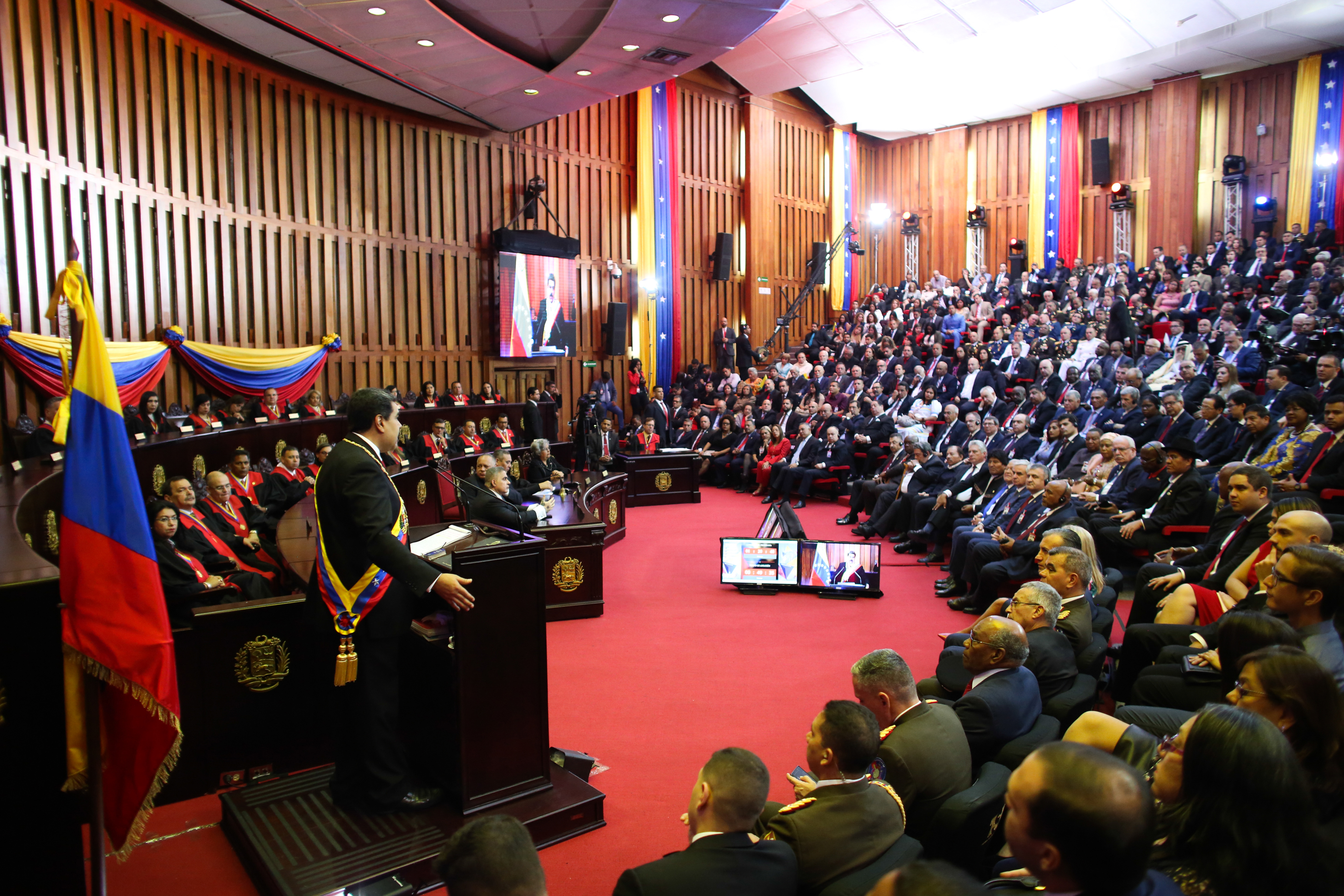
Maduro was inaugurated for a contested and controversial second term in January 2019.

Maduro won the 2018 election with 68% of the vote. The result was challenged by Argentina, Chile, Colombia, Brazil, Canada, Germany, France and the US, which deemed it fraudulent and recognized Juan Guaidó as president. Other countries continued to recognize Maduro, although China, facing financial pressure over its position, began hedging by decreasing loans, cancelling joint ventures, and signaling willingness to work with all parties. In August 2019, Trump imposed an economic embargo against Venezuela. The EU and Canada also sanctioned Venezuela. The sanctions froze more than $7 billion in additional Venezuelan assets and embargoed Venezuelan petroleum. Between 2014 and 2020, Venezuela lost 99% of its foreign currency income. Due to the impact of the sanctions, Maduro's government had to implement anti-blockade policies that increased the confidentiality of business transactions with the government, and allowed it to make deals in contravention of constitutional prohibitions on private majority shareholders.

In March 2020, the US Department of Justice indicted Maduro and Venezuelan officials on charges of drug trafficking, narcoterrorism, and corruption. In May 2020, Venezuelan dissidents backed by Silvercorp USA attempted to infiltrate Venezuela by sea and overthrow Maduro in Operation Gideon. The owner of Silvercorp, an ex-US special operations sergeant, said he met with Trump administration officials about the plan. In 2021, American and European financial institutions blocked Venezuela's payments to Covax, preventing it from acquiring COVID-19 vaccines. Sanctions also prevented Venezuela from obtaining oil dilutants, which are needed to turn the heavy crude it produces into an exportable petroleum product. A 2021 deal with Iran gave Venezuela access to dilutants that allowed it to marginally increase its oil production.

In June 2020, a report documented enforced disappearances that occurred in 2018–19. Some 724 enforced disappearances of political detainees were reported. According to Human Rights Watch (HRW), between 2016 and 2019, Venezuela's security forces killed over 19,000 people for alleged "resistance to authority". HRW stated that evidence showed that many of the killings were extrajudicial executions. The report states that Venezuelan security forces had subjected victims to torture and that the government used enforced disappearances to silence opponents and other critical voices.

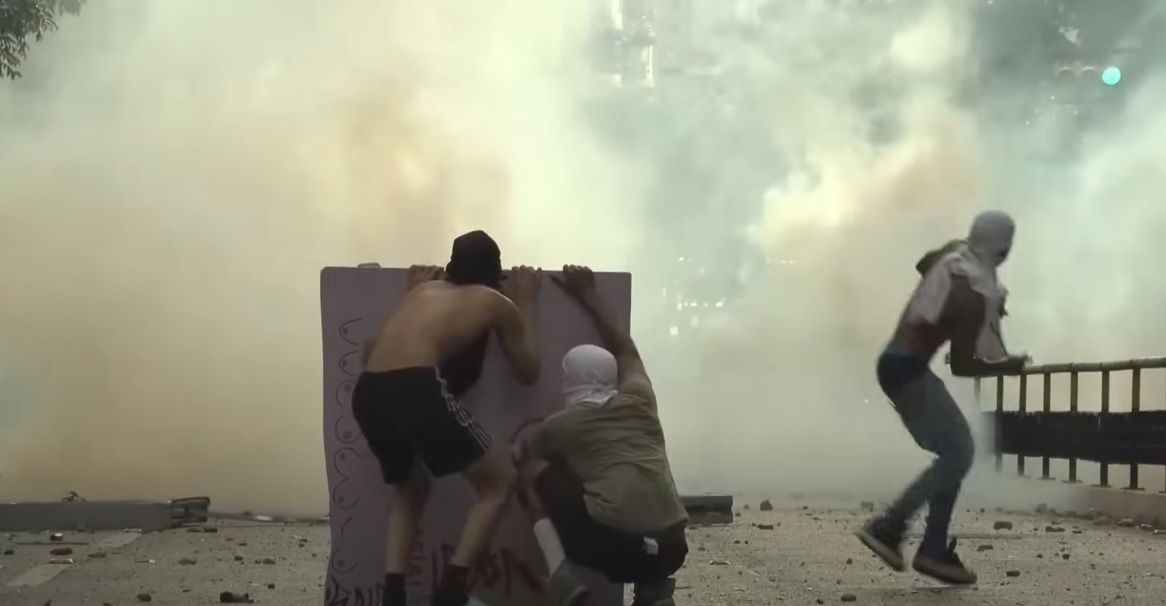
Protesters in Caracas fighting against the public forces during the 2024 Venezuelan protests

Maduro ran for a third consecutive term in the 2024 presidential election, while former diplomat Edmundo González Urrutia represented the Unitary Platform (Spanish: Plataforma Unitaria Democrática; PUD), the main opposition political alliance. Polls conducted before the election indicated that González would win by a wide margin. After the government-controlled National Electoral Council (CNE) announced partial results showing a narrow Maduro victory on 29 July, world leaders predominantly expressed skepticism of the claimed results and did not recognize the CNE claims with only some exceptions. Both González and Maduro proclaimed themselves winners of the election. The results of the election were not recognized by the Carter Center and Organization of American States due to the lack of granular results and were disputed by the opposition, which claimed a landslide victory and released access to vote tallies collected by poll watchers from a majority of polling centers as proof. In the aftermath of the announcement of results by the election authorities, protests broke out across the country.

==== Capture of Maduro and post-intervention Venezuela ====
Following growing tensions in 2024 and 2025, the United States' Trump administration began preparing an intervention against Nicolás Maduro's government, falsely accusing it of having links with narco-terrorist networks such as the Tren de Aragua and conspiring to flood the United States with narcotics. In January 2026, the US launched airstrikes across the coastline of Venezuela as part of Operation Southern Spear. US president Donald Trump announced in a post on social media that Maduro had been captured and flown out of the country. Legal experts believe the military intrusion by the United States is likely a violation of the UN Charter's article 2(4). Article 2(4) requires respect for other countries' sovereignty. Article 2(4) also prohibits the use of military force without UN authorization with the exception of self-defense. In a later post, Trump said that the United States will "run" Venezuela until a safe transition of the country's leadership can take place. However, as of 4 January 2026, the government formerly led by Maduro remains in control, with Vice President Delcy Rodríguez having been appointed acting president. Rodríguez subsequently launched a minor purge of Maduro-era loyalists.

On 23 January 2026, Venezuelan lawmakers gave their initial backing to open the oil sector to private investors, paving the way for the return of US energy companies.

In May 2026, U.S. President Donald Trump twice expressed interest in making Venezuela the 51st state of the United States, citing the country's oil reserves as motivation. He reiterated the proposal in a Truth Social post that included a map of Venezuela filled with the U.S. flag. Venezuelan acting president Delcy Rodríguez responded that Venezuela had no plans to become a U.S. state, saying the country is "not a colony, but a free country," though her remarks were notably more restrained than previous Chavismo-era responses to similar U.S. statements. Commentators noted that under the U.S. Constitution, statehood cannot be unilaterally declared by the president and would require congressional approval as well as the consent of Venezuela.

Since the intervention, Venezuela has been described as a puppet state of the U.S., with several aspects of its domestic finances, foreign policy, government appointments, revenues, and oil reserves overseen by the U.S. Department of State under Secretary of State Marco Rubio. The Venezuelan government now conditionally receives its export revenue through the Department of the Treasury, with the Department of State determining which businesses operate in Venezuela through sanctions and business licences they issue, vetting personnel, foreign policy statements, with Rodriguez's public appearances even being dictated at times by the Executive Office of the President.

== Geography ==
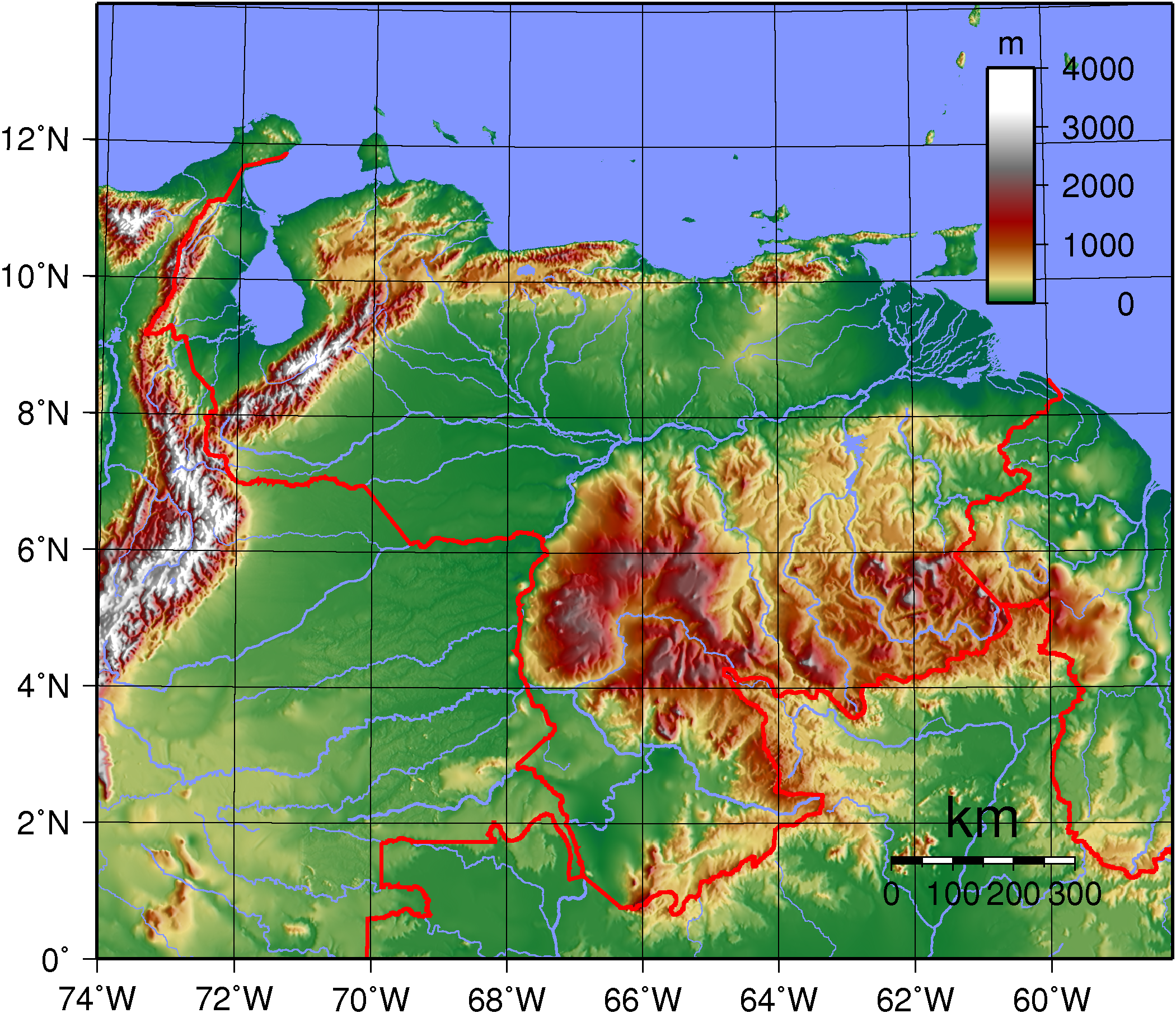
A topographic map of Venezuela

Venezuela states and capitals

Venezuela is located in the north of South America. Geologically, its mainland rests on the South American Plate. It has a total area of 916,445 km^{2} (353,841 sq mi) and a land area of 882,050 km^{2} (340,560 sq mi), making Venezuela the 32nd largest country in the world. The territory it controls lies between latitudes 0° and 16°N and longitudes 59° and 74°W.

Shaped roughly like a triangle, Venezuela has a 2,800 km (1,700 mi) coastline in the north, which includes numerous islands in the Caribbean and Atlantic Ocean. Most observers describe Venezuela in terms of four fairly well defined topographical regions: the Maracaibo lowlands in the northwest, the northern mountains extending in a broad east–west arc from the Colombian border along the northern Caribbean coast, the wide plains in central Venezuela, and the Guiana Highlands in the southeast.

The northern mountains are the extreme northeastern extensions of South America's Andes mountain range. Pico Bolívar, the nation's highest point at 4,979 m (16,335 ft), lies in this region. To the south, the dissected Guiana Highlands contain the northern fringes of the Amazon Basin and Angel Falls, the world's highest waterfall, as well as tepuis, large table-like mountains. Venezuela's center is characterized by the Llanos, which are extensive plains that stretch from the Colombian border in the far west to the Orinoco Delta in the east. The Orinoco with its rich alluvial soils binds the largest and most important river system. The Orinoco Basin is one of the largest watersheds in Latin America. The Caroní and the Apure are other major rivers.

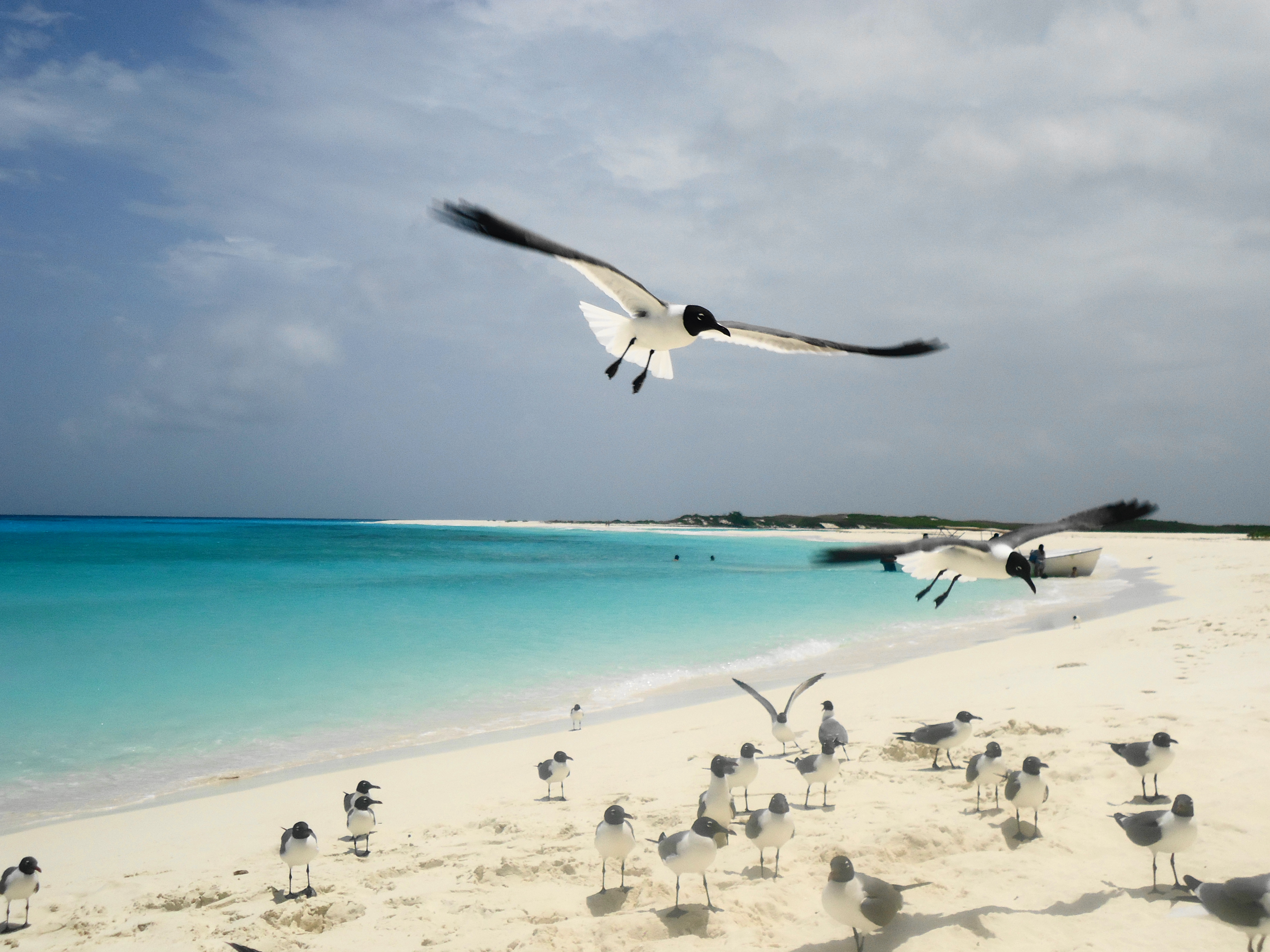
Cayo de Agua, Los Roques Archipiélago, Caribbean Sea

Venezuela borders Colombia to the west, Guyana to the east, and Brazil to the south. Caribbean islands such as Trinidad and Tobago, Grenada, Curaçao, Aruba, and the Leeward Antilles lie near the coast. Venezuela has territorial disputes with Guyana, formerly United Kingdom, largely concerning the Essequibo area, and with Colombia concerning the Gulf of Venezuela.

=== Climate ===
Venezuela is entirely located in the tropics over the Equator to around 12° N. Its climate varies from humid low-elevation plains, where average annual temperatures range as high as 35 °C (95.0 °F), to glaciers and highlands (the páramos) with an average yearly temperature of 8 °C (46.4 °F). Annual rainfall varies from 430 mm (16.9 in) in the semiarid portions of the northwest to over 1,000 mm (39.4 in) in the Orinoco Delta of the far east and the Amazon rainforest in the south.

The precipitation level is lower from August to April. These periods are referred to as hot-humid and cold-dry seasons. Another characteristic of the climate is this variation throughout Venezuela by the existence of a mountain range called "Cordillera de la Costa" which crosses Venezuela from east to west. The majority of the population lives in these mountains. Meanwhile, the unique geography of and around Lake Maracaibo causes mountain-valley and land-sea breezes that causes the most frequent lightning anywhere in the world, also known as Cataumbo lightning.

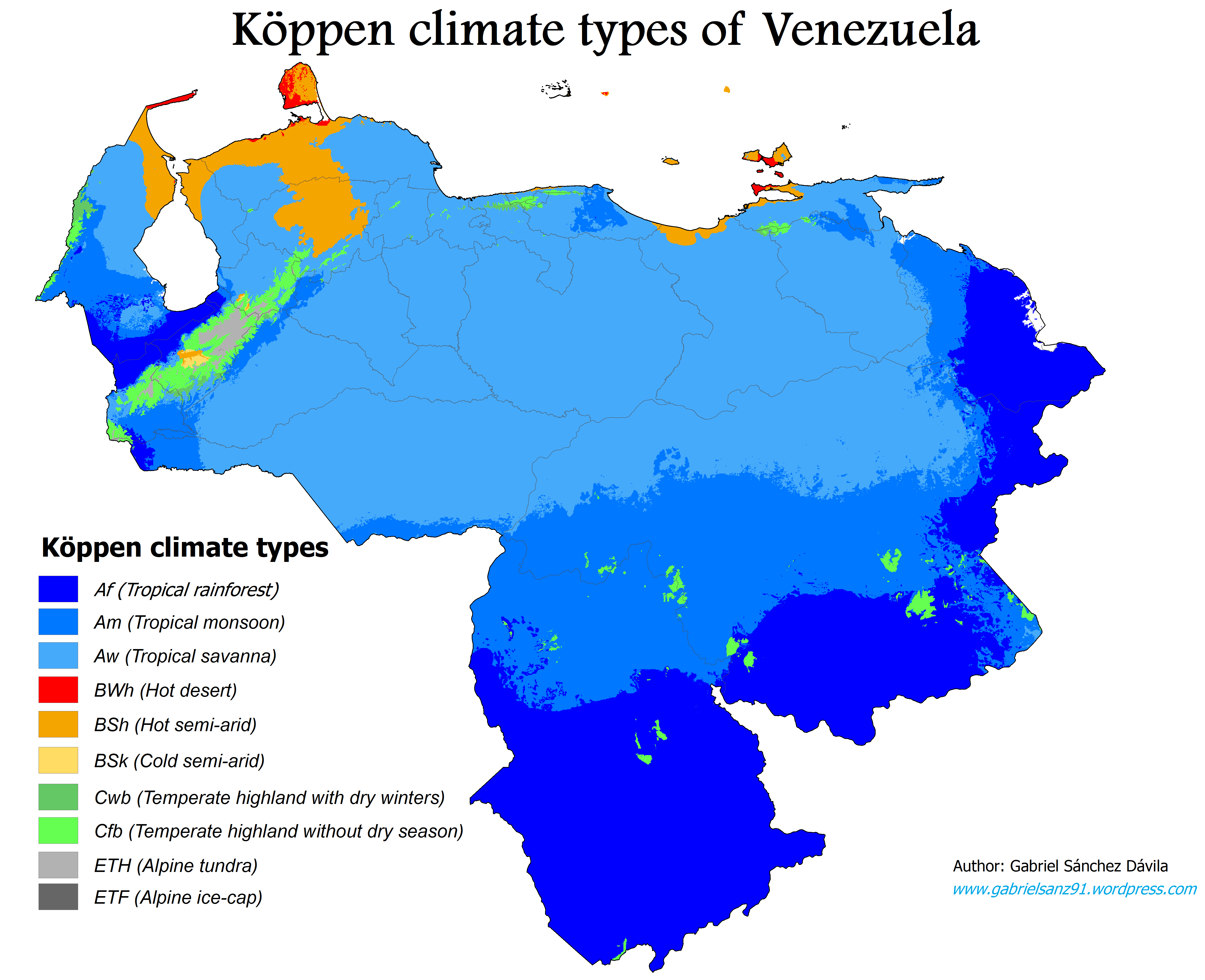
A Köppen climate classification map of Venezuela

Venezuela falls into four horizontal temperature zones based primarily on elevation, having tropical, dry, temperate with dry winters, and polar (alpine tundra) climates, amongst others. In the tropical zone—below 800 m (2,625 ft)—temperatures are hot, with yearly averages ranging between 26 and 28 °C (78.8 and 82.4 °F). The temperate zone ranges between 800 and 2,000 m (2,625 and 6,562 ft) with averages from 12 to 25 °C (53.6 to 77.0 °F); many of Venezuela's cities, including the capital, lie in this region. Colder conditions with temperatures from 9 to 11 °C (48.2 to 51.8 °F) are found in the cool zone between 2,000 and 3,000 m (6,562 and 9,843 ft), especially in the Venezuelan Andes, where pastureland and permanent snowfield with yearly averages below 8 °C (46 °F) cover land above 3,000 meters (9,843 ft) in the páramos. The highest temperature recorded was 42 °C (108 °F) in Machiques. The lowest temperature recorded was −11 °C (12 °F), reported from an uninhabited high altitude at Páramo de Piedras Blancas (Mérida state).

=== Biodiversity and conservation ===
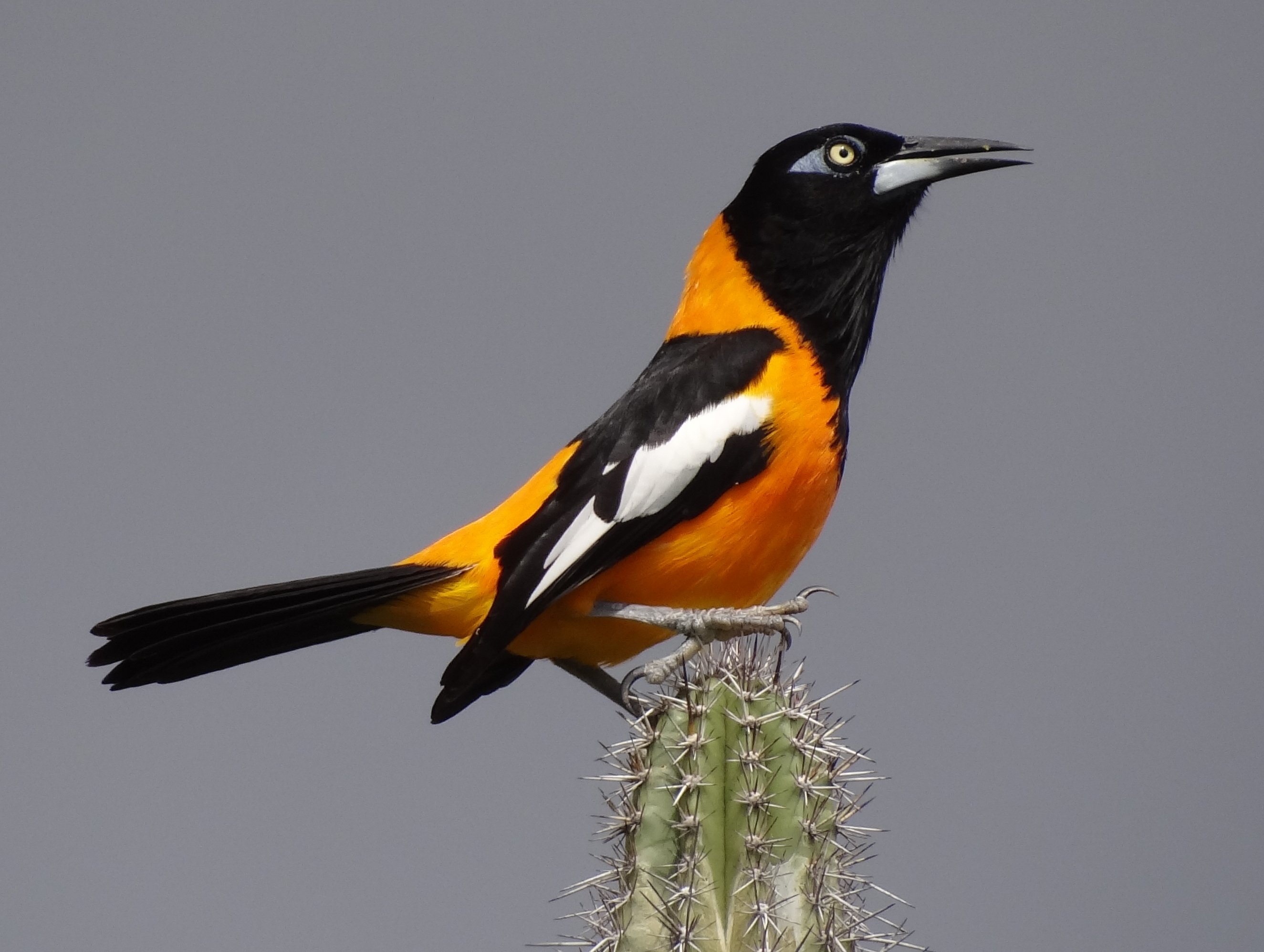
The national animal of Venezuela is the Venezuelan troupial.

Venezuela lies within the Neotropical realm. Large portions of the region were originally covered by moist broadleaf forests. One of 17 megadiverse countries, Venezuela's habitats range from the Andes Mountains in the west to the Amazon Basin rainforest in the south, via extensive llanos plains and Caribbean coast in the center and the Orinoco Delta in the east. They include xeric scrublands in the extreme northwest and coastal mangrove forests in the northeast. Its cloud forests and lowland rainforests are particularly rich.

Animals are diverse and include manatees, three-toed sloth, two-toed sloth, Amazon river dolphins, and Orinoco crocodiles. Of the 1,417 bird species, 48 are endemic. Important birds include ibises, ospreys, kingfishers, and the yellow-orange Venezuelan troupial, the national bird. Notable mammals include the giant anteater, jaguar, and the capybara, the world's largest rodent. More than half of the avian and mammalian species are found in the Amazonian forests south of the Orinoco.

For the fungi, an account was provided by R.W.G. Dennis which has been digitized and the records made available on-line as part of the Cybertruffle Robigalia database. That database includes nearly 3,900 species of fungi, but is far from complete, and the true total number of fungal species already known is likely higher, given the generally accepted estimate that only about 7% of all fungi worldwide have so far been recorded.

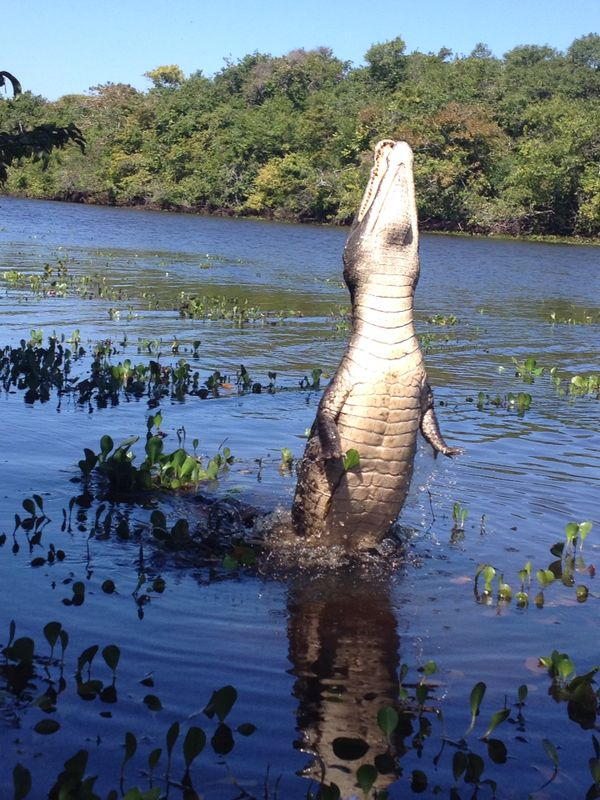
A crocodile in Hato El Cedral in Apure State

Among plants, over 25,000 species of orchids are found in the cloud forest and lowland rainforest ecosystems. These include the flor de mayo orchid (Cattleya mossiae), the national flower. The national tree is the araguaney. The tops of the tepuis are home to several carnivorous plants including the marsh pitcher plant, Heliamphora, and the insectivorous bromeliad, Brocchinia reducta.

Venezuela is among the top 20 countries in terms of endemism. Among its animals, 23% of reptilian and 50% of amphibian species, including the Trinidad poison frog, are endemic. 1,334 species of fungi have been tentatively identified as endemic. Some 38% of the plant species are unique to the country.

Venezuela is one of the 10 most biodiverse countries on the planet, yet it is one of the leaders of deforestation due to economic and political factors. Each year, roughly 287,600 hectares of forest are permanently destroyed, and other areas are degraded by mining, oil extraction, and logging. Between 1990 and 2005, Venezuela officially lost 8.3% of its forest cover, which is about 4.3 million ha. In response, federal protections for critical habitat were implemented. For example, 20% to 33% of forested land is protected. Venezuela's biosphere reserve is part of the World Network of Biosphere Reserves. Five wetlands are registered under the Ramsar Convention.

In 2003, 70% of Venezuela's land was under conservation management in over 200 protected areas, including 43 national parks such as Canaima National Park, Morrocoy National Park, and Mochima National Park. In the far south is a reserve for the Yanomami tribes. Covering 32,000 square miles (82,880 square kilometres), the area is off-limits to farmers, miners, and all non-Yanomami settlers.

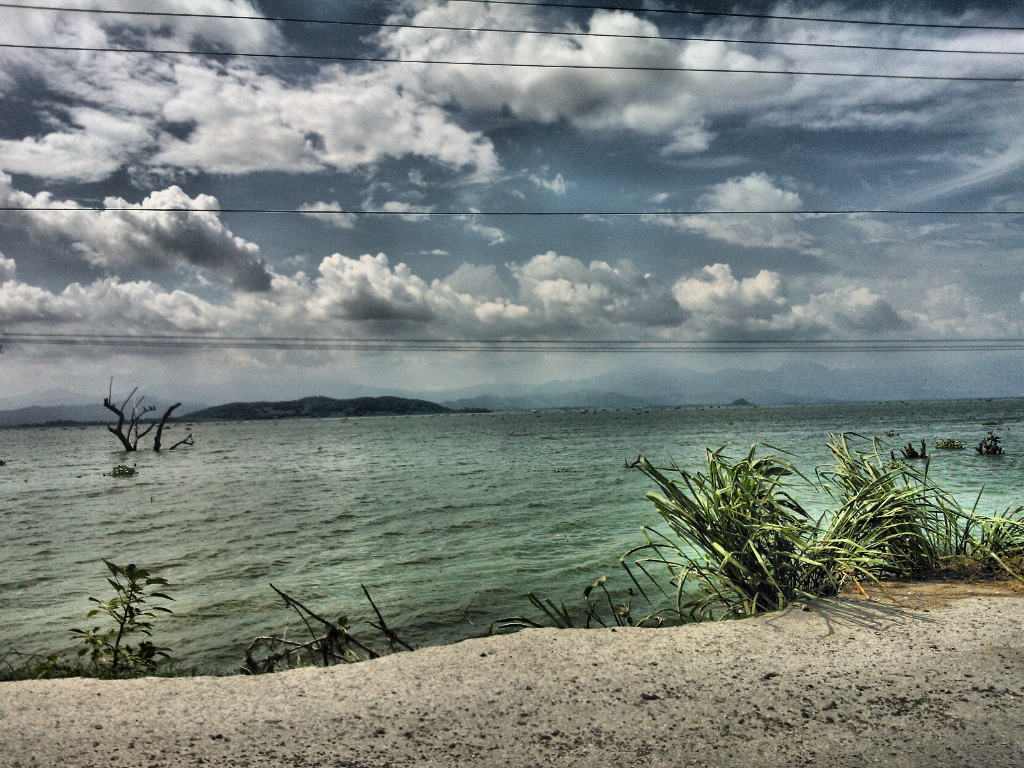
Valencia Lake, formerly praised by Alexander von Humboldt for its beauty, is massively polluted due to the countless sewage systems pouring residuals.

Venezuela was one of the few countries that did not enter a nationally determined contribution at the 2015 United Nations Climate Change Conference. Many terrestrial ecosystems are considered endangered, specially the dry forest in the northern regions of the country and the coral reefs in the Caribbean coast.

=== Hydrography ===
Venezuela is made up of three river basins: the Caribbean Sea, the Atlantic Ocean and Lake Valencia, which forms an endorheic basin and drains a small area. Most of Venezuela's river waters drain to the Atlantic. The largest basin in this area is the extensive Orinoco Basin whose surface area, close to one million km^{2}, is greater than that of the whole of Venezuela, although it has a presence of 65% in the country. The Orinoco gives rise to a flow of some 33,000 m^{3}/s, making it the third largest in the world and one of the most valuable from the point of view of renewable natural resources. The Brazo Casiquiare is unique in the world, as it is a natural bifurcation of the Orinoco that, after some 500 km in length, connects it to the Negro River, which in turn is a tributary of the Amazon.

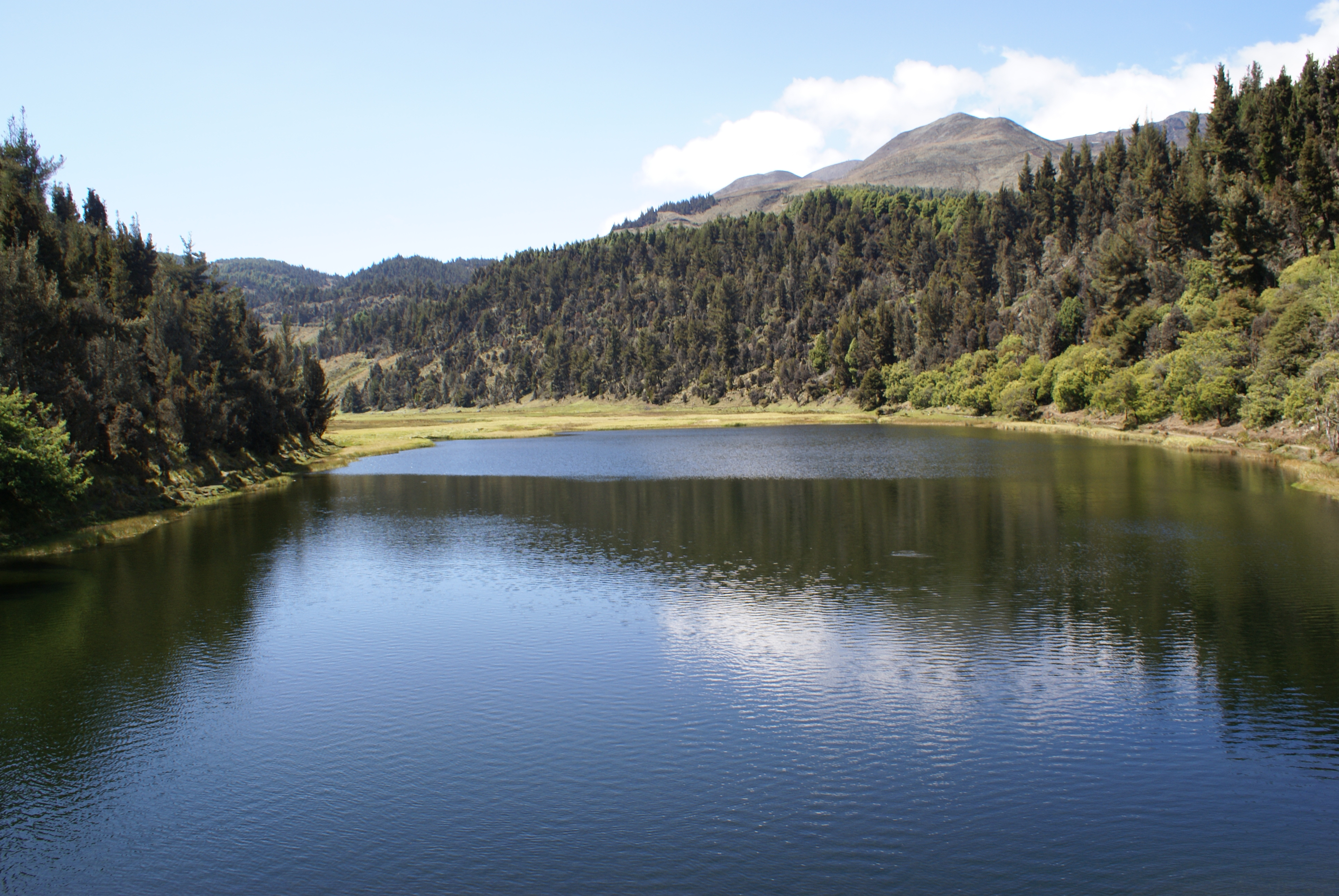
Victoria Lagoon, Mérida State

The Orinoco receives directly or indirectly rivers such as the Ventuari, the Caura, the Caroní, the Meta, the Arauca, the Apure and many others. Other Venezuelan rivers that empty into the Atlantic are the waters of the San Juan and Cuyuní basins. The Amazon River receives the Guainía, the Negro and others. Other basins are the Gulf of Paria and the Esequibo River.

The rivers which empty into the Caribbean Sea are usually short and of scarce and irregular flow, with some exceptions such as the Catatumbo, which originates in Colombia and drains into the Maracaibo Lake basin. Among the rivers that reach the Maracaibo Lake basin are the Chama, the Escalante, the Catatumbo, and the contributions of the smaller basins of the Tocuyo, Yaracuy, Neverí and Manzanares rivers.

Of the rivers, a total of 5400 km are navigable. Other rivers include the Apure, Arauca, Caura, Meta, Barima, Portuguesa, Ventuari and Zulia. Lakes include Lake Maracaibo—the largest in South America, open to the sea through the natural channel but with fresh water—and Lake Valencia. Other noteworthy bodies of water are the Guri reservoir, the Altagracia lagoon, the Camatagua reservoir and the Mucubají lagoon in the Andes.

=== Relief ===
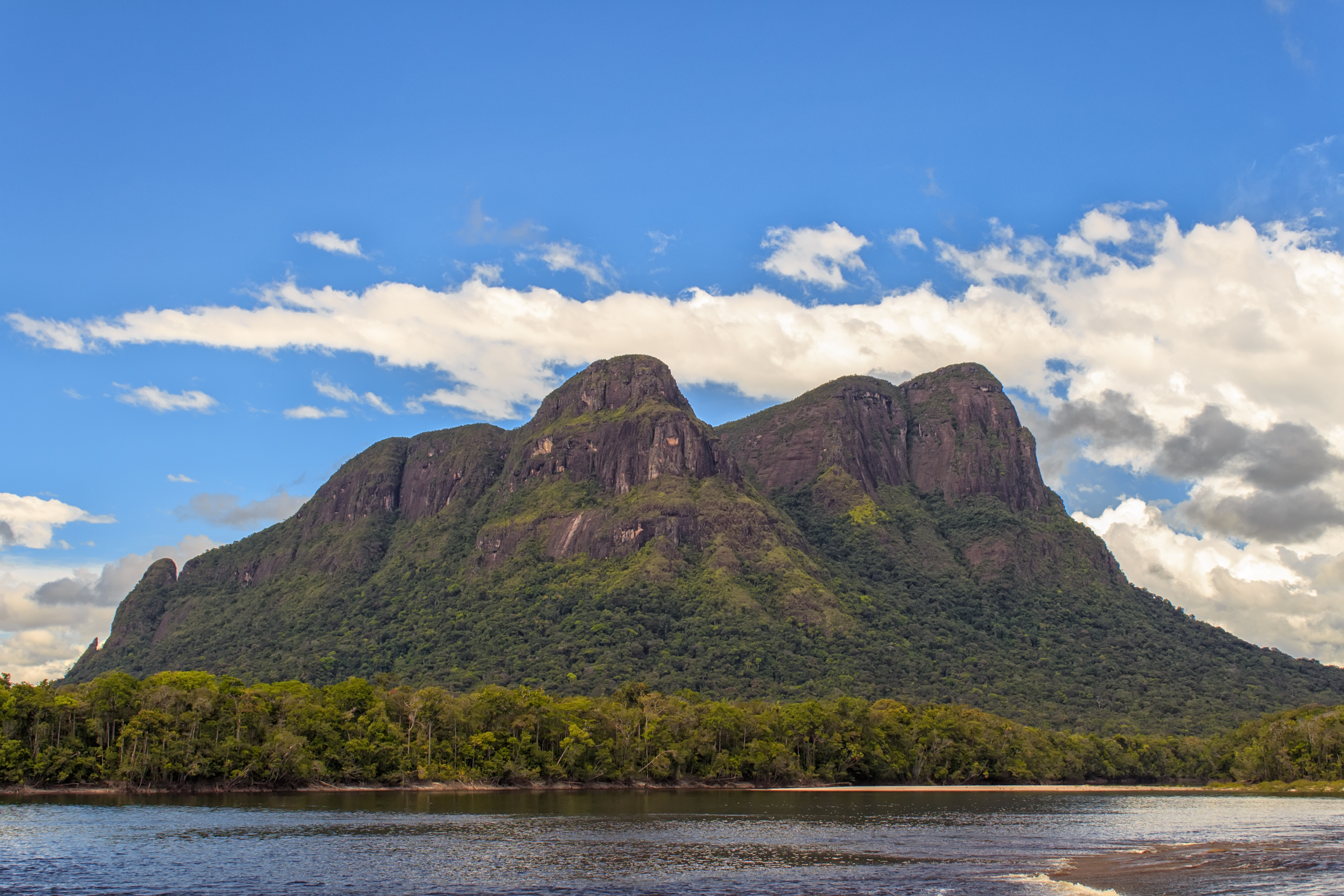
Amazon rainforest and Autana River, Amazonas state

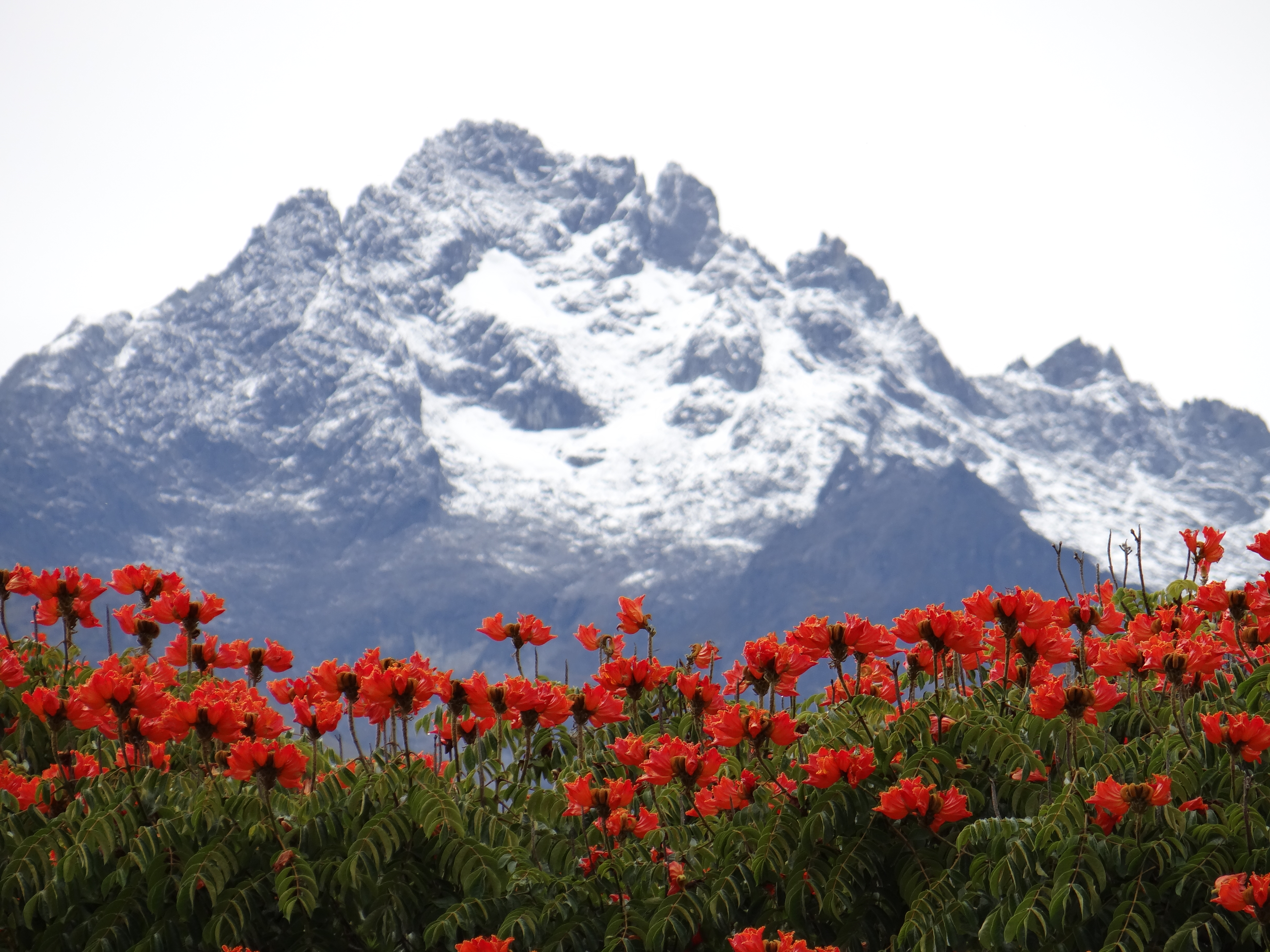
Bolívar Peak, the highest mountain in Venezuela, in Sierra Nevada de Mérida

The landscape is the product of the interaction of tectonic plates that since the Paleozoic have contributed to its current appearance. On the formed structures, seven physical-natural units have been modeled, differentiated in their relief and in their natural resources. The relief has the following characteristics: coastline with several peninsulas and islands, adenas of the Andes mountain range (north and northwest), Lake Maracaibo (between the chains, on the coast); Orinoco Delta, region of peneplains and plateaus (tepui, east of the Orinoco) that together form the Guyanas massif (plateaus, southeast of the country).

The oldest rock formations in South America are found in the complex basement of the Guyanas highlands and in the crystalline line of the Maritime and Cordillera massifs in Venezuela. The Venezuelan part of the Guyanas Altiplano consists of a large granite block of gneiss and other crystalline Archean rocks, with underlying layers of sandstone and shale clay. The core of granite and cordillera is, to a large extent, flanked by sedimentary layers from the Cretaceous, folded in an anticline structure. Between these orographic systems there are plains covered with tertiary and quaternary layers of gravel, sands and clayey marls. The depression contains lagoons and lakes, among which is that of Maracaibo, and presents, on the surface, alluvial deposits from the Quaternary.

- Coastal Mountain Range

Also known as the Cordillera de la Costa, stretches along Venezuela's northern coast. This region is known for its lush tropical rainforests, stunning coastal views, and a rich variety of flora and fauna. The intermountain depressions, or valleys, between the mountain ranges are often home to fertile agricultural land and vibrant communities. These valleys offer a stark contrast to the rugged mountains that rise dramatically from the coast.

- Lara-Falcón Highlands

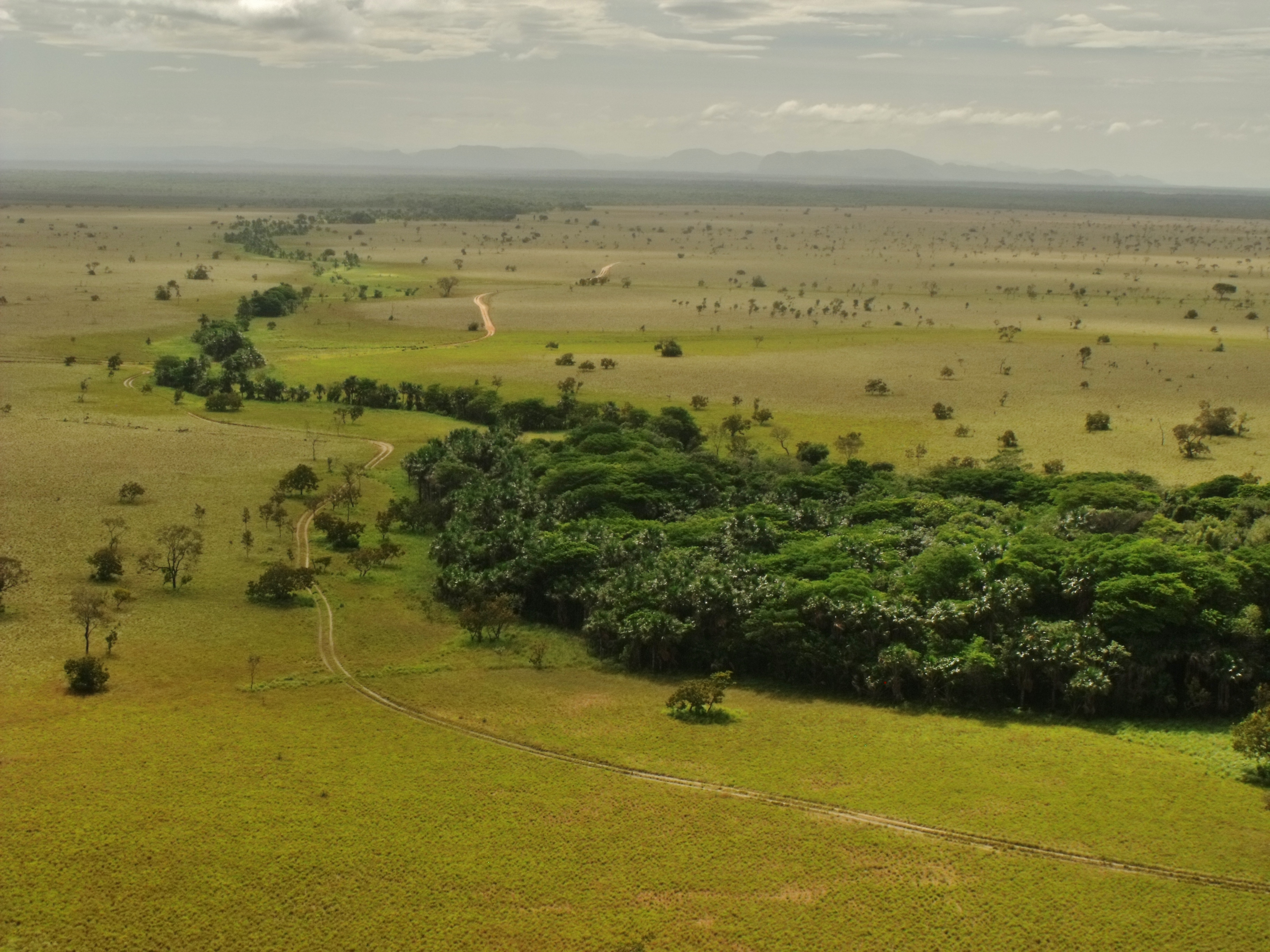
Los Llanos, Apure state

Situated in northwestern Venezuela, the Lara-Falcón Highlands exhibit a terrain defined by plateaus and rolling hills. These highlands provide a significant contrast to the surrounding lowlands and coastal areas. The relief is characterized by gently sloping plateaus that support agriculture, including coffee and cacao cultivation. This region's semi-arid climate and picturesque landscapes make it an important agricultural and tourism center.

- Lake Maracaibo Lowlands

Encompass the basin of Lake Maracaibo and the plains surrounding the Gulf of Venezuela. This region offers two distinct plains—the northern one is relatively dry, while the southern one is humid and dotted with swamps. The relief is primarily characterized by flat terrain, with the exception of some elevated areas near the lake. Lake Maracaibo sits in a depression, surrounded by oil-rich lands and productive agricultural areas.

- The Andes

The Venezuelan Andes, part of the broader Andes mountain range, offer a striking relief with towering peaks, deep valleys, and fertile intermontane basins. Dominated by these corpulent mountain ranges, including Venezuela's highest peak, Bolívar Peak, the region's rugged and picturesque landscapes are defined by its high-altitude terrain.

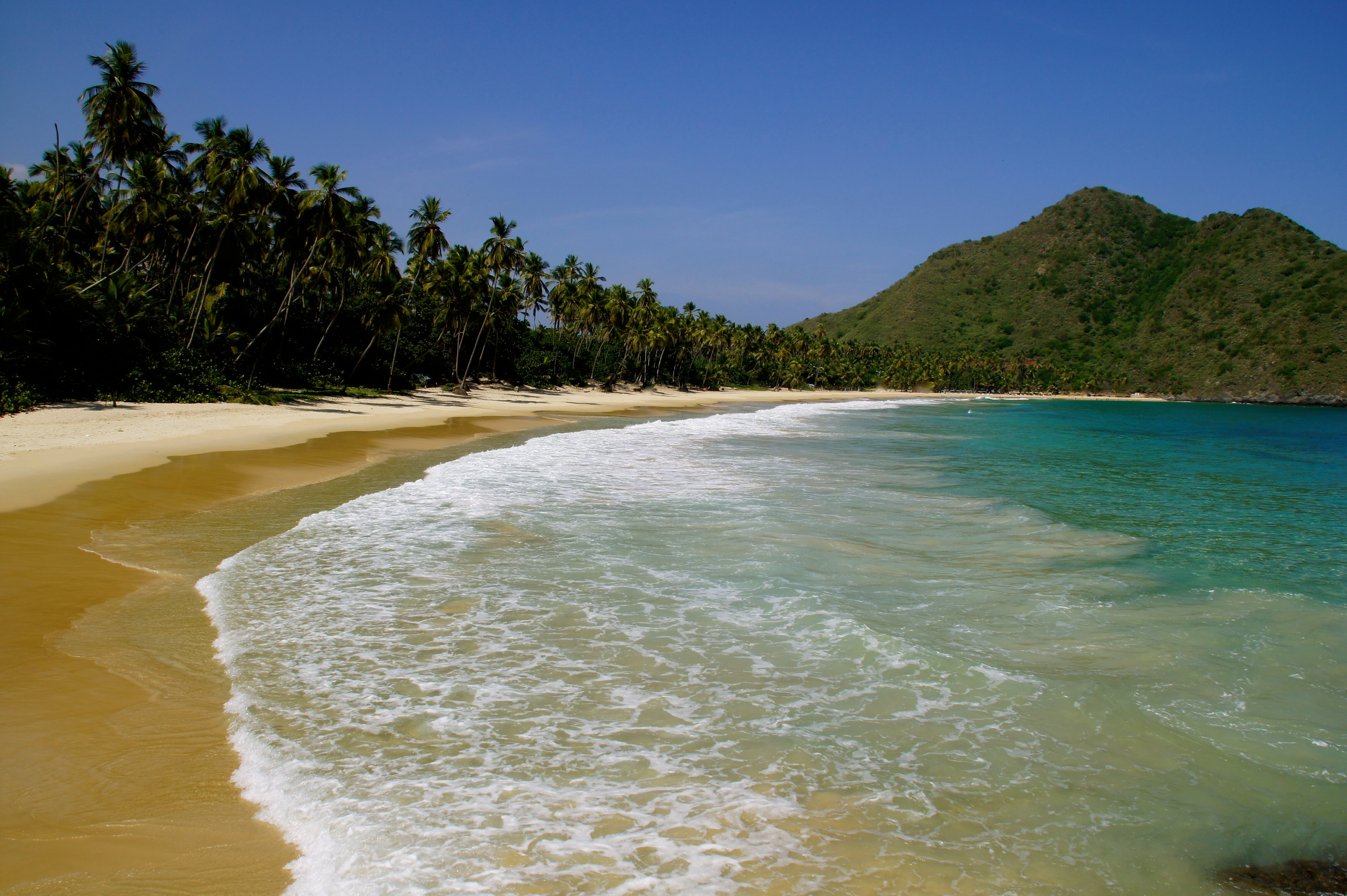
Coastal Mountain Range (Cordillera de la Costa) in Venezuela

The unique relief of this area finds its origins in the Last Glacial Period, where the interplay of repeated glacier advances and retreats sculpted the landscape, shaped by the cold, high-altitude climate. This glacial heritage has left a lasting imprint, with glaciers carving deep valleys and polishing rugged peaks, while sheltered intramontane valleys offer fertile soils and temperate microclimates, creating ideal conditions for agriculture and human settlement.

- Los Llanos

Los Llanos, or "the plains", are expansive sedimentary basins characterized by predominantly flat relief. The eastern Llanos feature low-plateaus and the Unare depression, created through mesa erosion, adding diversity to the terrain. This region is subject to seasonal flooding, transforming the flat plains into a vast wetland during the rainy season. The relief influences the region's unique ecosystems, including extensive grasslands and abundant wildlife.

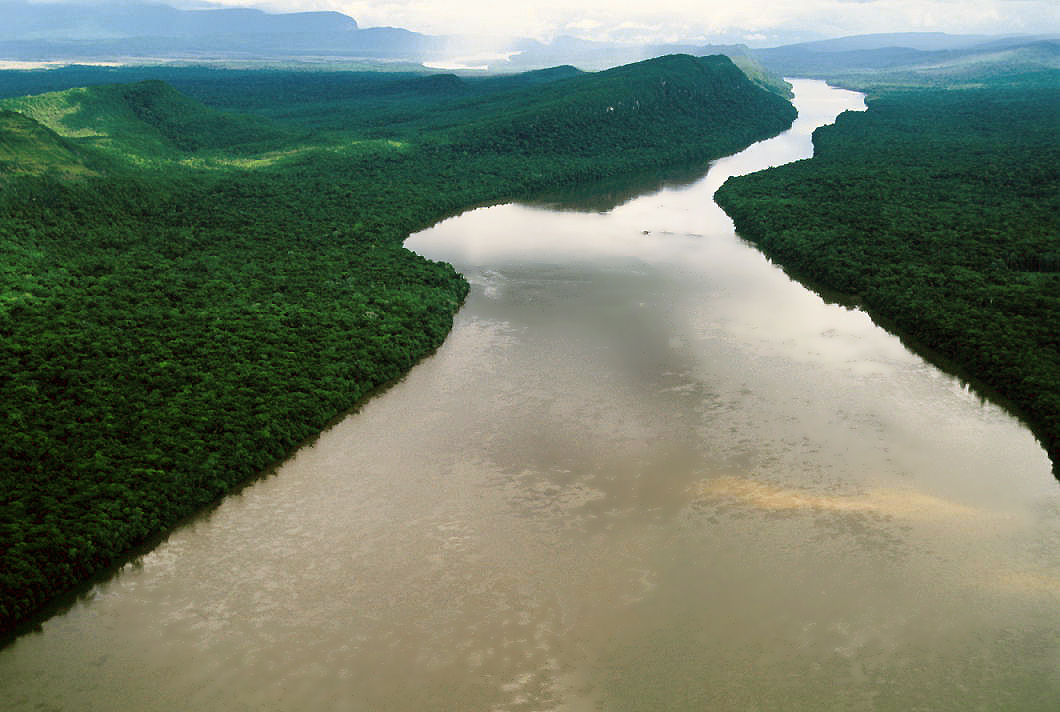
- Guayana natural region in Venezuela
  Guiana Shield

This region encompasses peneplains, rugged mountain ranges, foothills, and the iconic tepuis, or table-top mountains. The tepuis stand as isolated, flat-topped plateaus that rise dramatically from the surrounding terrain. This unique relief contributes to the region's remarkable biodiversity and scientific significance.

- Orinoco Delta

The Orinoco Delta's relief is characterized by a complex system of lands and waters. It consists of numerous channels, islands, and shifting sedimentary deposits. While the relief may appear relatively uniform, it conceals a dynamic environment influenced by seasonal flooding and sediment deposition. This complex deltaic relief supports diverse aquatic life and the livelihoods of indigenous communities adapted to its ever-changing landscapes.

=== Valleys ===
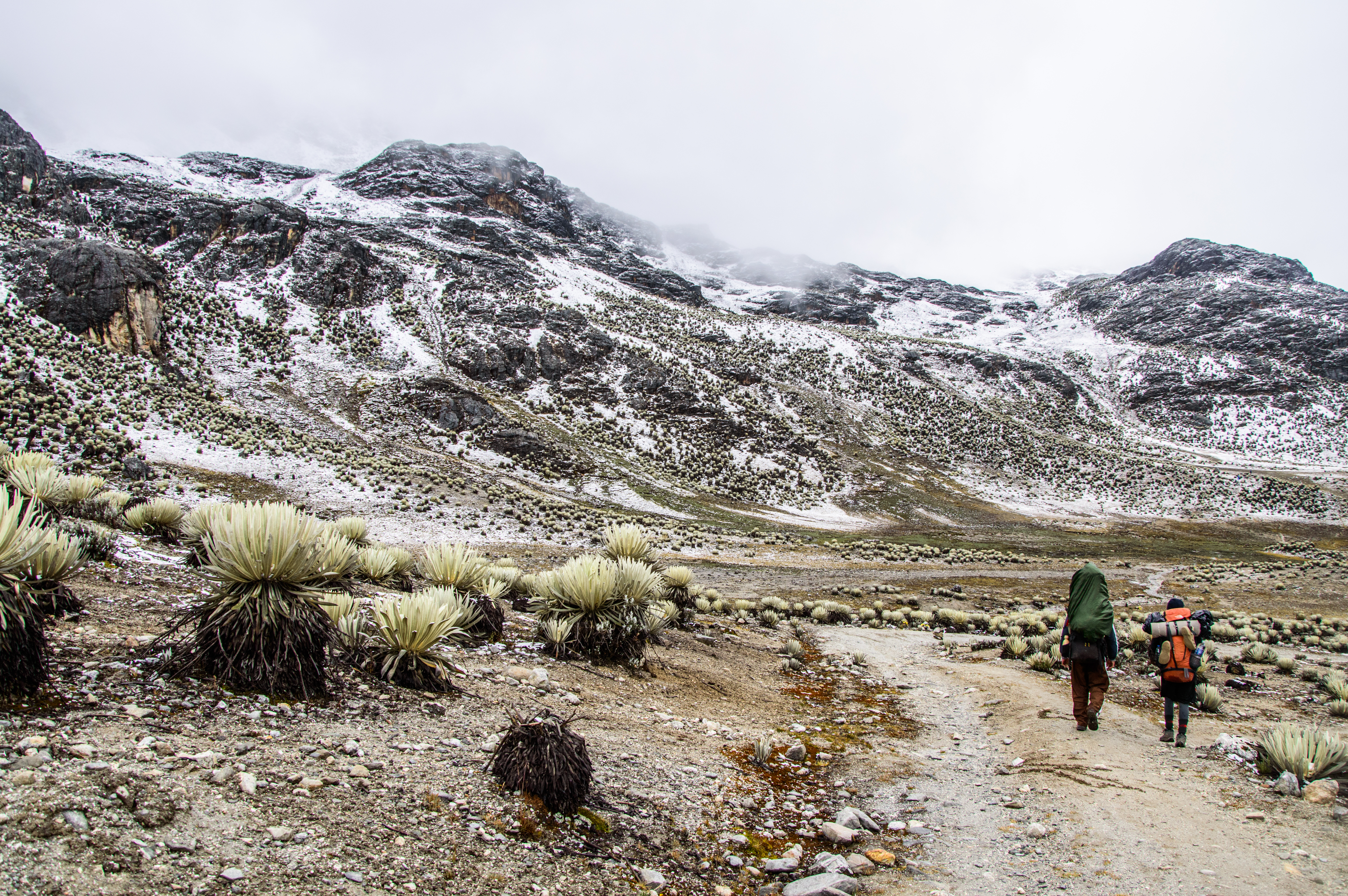
Valle de Mifafí, Mérida State

The valleys are an important type of landscape in the Venezuelan territory, not because of their spatial extension but because they are the environment where most of the country's population and economic activities are concentrated. Fluvial valleys are the most common, with glacial valleys restricted to the highest parts of the Andes. Moreover, most glacial valleys are relics of a past geologic epoch, which culminated some 10,000 to 12,000 years ago.

The deep and narrow Andean valleys are very different from the wide depressions of Aragua and Carabobo, in the Cordillera de la Costa, or from the valleys nestled in the Mesas de Monagas. These examples indicate that the configuration of the local relief is decisive in identifying regional types of valleys. Likewise, due to their warm climate, the Guayana valleys are distinguished from the temperate or cold Andean valleys by their humid environment. Both are, in turn, different from the semi-arid depressions of the states of Lara and Falcón.

The Andean valleys, essentially agricultural, precociously populated but nowadays in loss of speed, do not confront the same problems of space occupation as the strongly urbanized and industrialized valleys of the central section of the Cordillera de la Costa. On the other hand, the unpopulated and practically untouched Guiana valleys are another category this area is called the Lost World (Mundo Perdido).

The Andean valleys are undoubtedly the most impressive of the Venezuelan territory because of the energy of the encasing reliefs, whose summits often dominate the valley bottoms by 3,000 to 3,500 meters of relative altitude. They are also the most picturesque in terms of their style of habitat, forms of land use, handicraft production and all the traditions linked to these activities.

=== Deserts ===
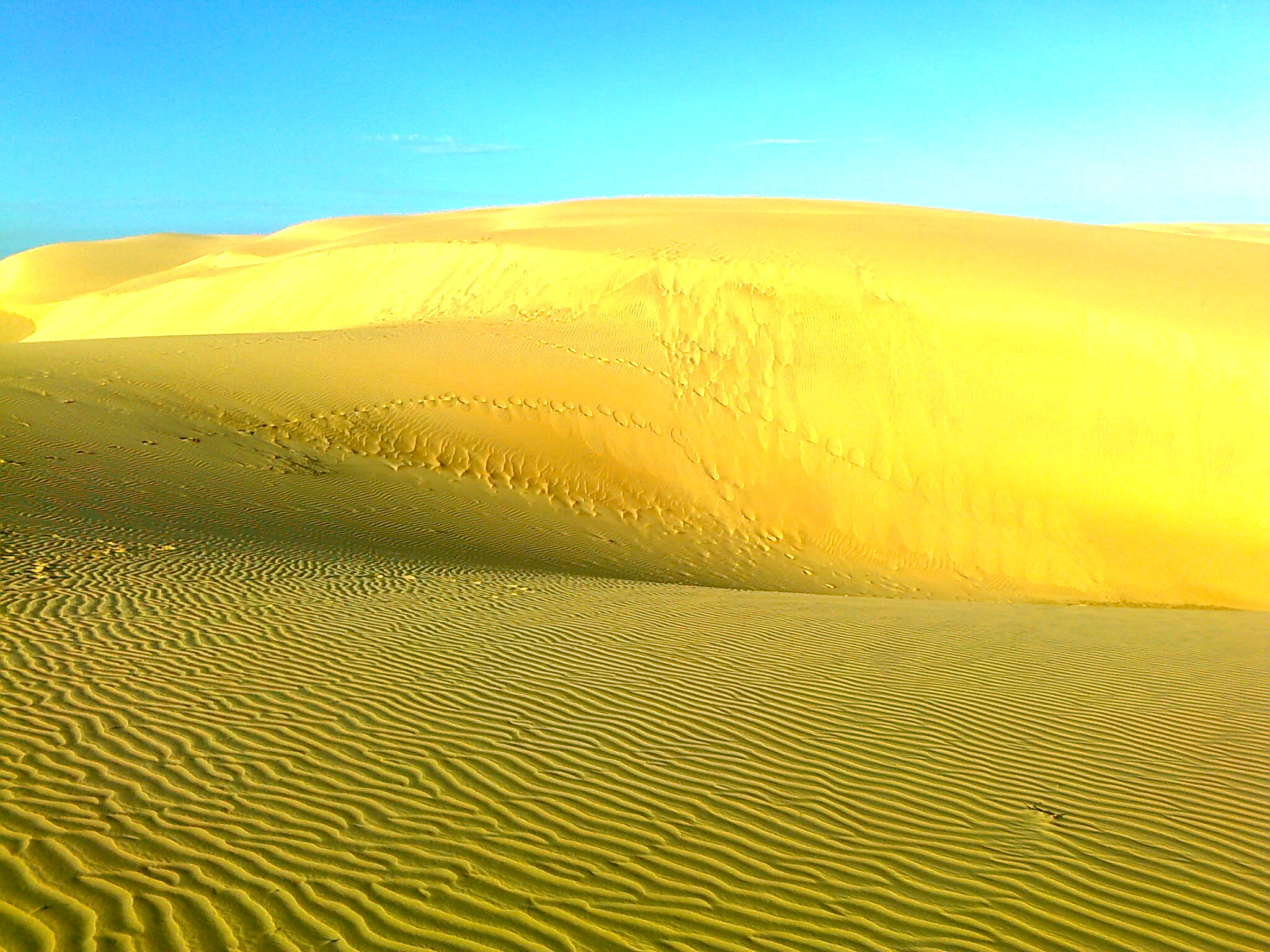
Médanos de Coro National Park, Paraguaná Peninsula, Falcón State, Venezuela

Venezuela has a great diversity of landscapes and climates, including arid and dry areas. The main desert in the country is in the state of Falcon near the city of Coro. It is protected as the Médanos de Coro National Park. The park is the largest of its kind in Venezuela, covering 91 square kilometres. The landscape is dotted with cacti and other xerophytic plants that can survive in humidity-free conditions near the desert. Other desert areas in the country include part of the Guajira Desert in the Guajira Municipality in the north of Zulia State and facing the Gulf of Venezuela, the Médanos de Capanaparo in the Santos Luzardo National Park in Apure State, the Medanos de la Isla de Zapara in Zulia State, the so-called Hundición de Yay in the Andrés Eloy Blanco Municipality of Lara State, and the Urumaco Formation also in Falcón State.

Desert wildlife includes mostly lizards, iguanas and other reptiles. Although less frequent, the desert is home to some foxes, giant anteaters and rabbits. There are also some native bird populations, such as the sparrowhawk, tropical mockingbird, scaly dove and crested quail.

=== Earthquakes ===
Map of earthquakes in Venezuela since 1900, with magnitudes. Click for dates and details. (map data)

Venezuela is located in a seismically active region, making it susceptible to earthquakes. Historically, Venezuela has experienced numerous earthquakes, some of which have caused massive damage. The most notable are the 1812 Caracas earthquake, a magnitude of 7.4 caused extensive damage in Caracas, La Guaira, Barquisimeto, San Felipe, and Mérida. The 1967 Caracas earthquake, with its epicenter being 20 km (12 mi) from the Venezuelan capital Caracas that registered a magnitude of 6.3. The 1997 Cariaco earthquake, a magnitude 6.9 thats epicenter was in the Cariaco Basin. The 2018 earthquake, at a magnitude 7.3 that occurred near Sucre, and the 2026 Venezuela earthquakes, a strike-slip earthquakes affected northwestern and central Venezuela.

== Government and politics ==
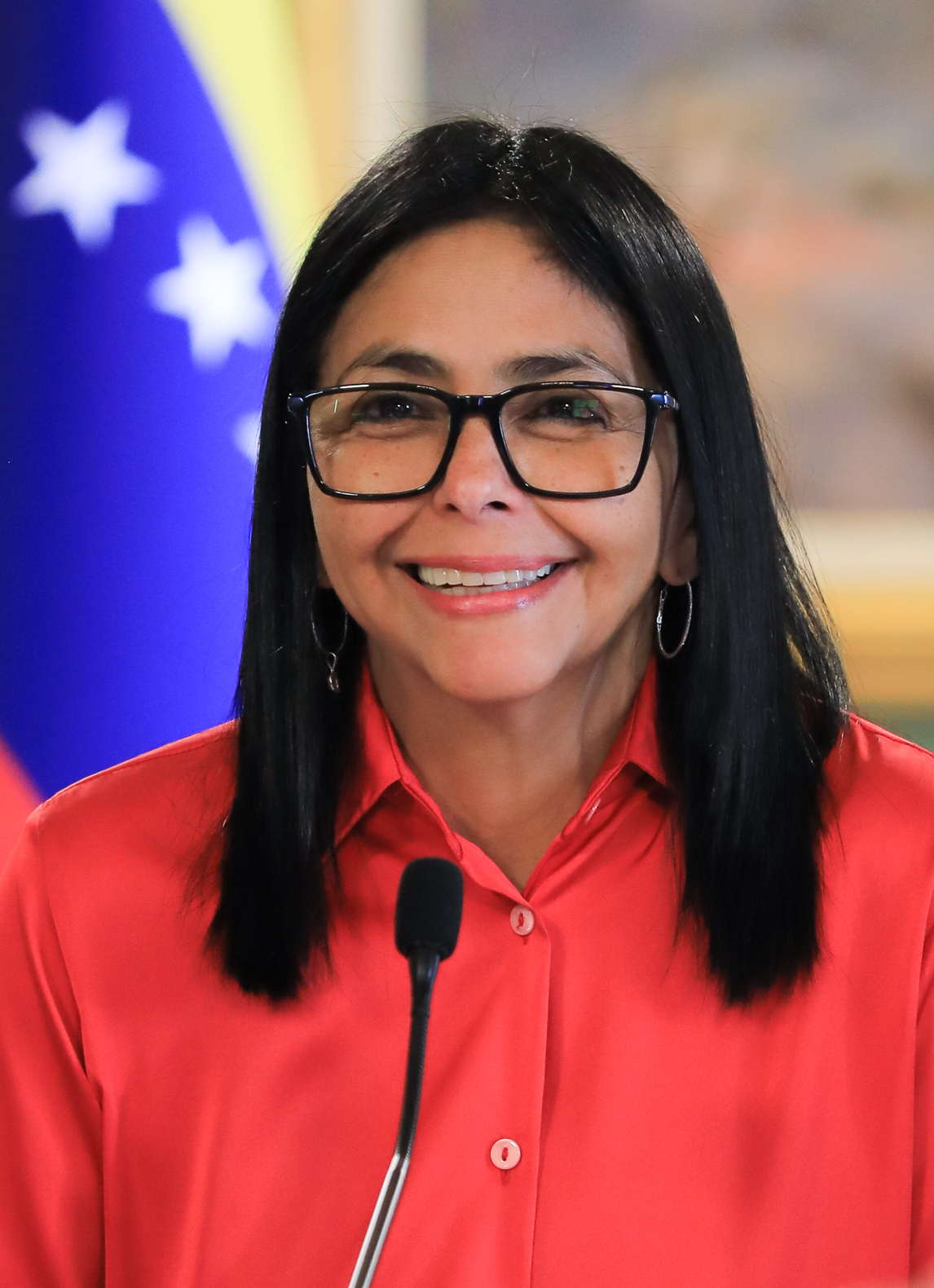
Delcy Rodríguez
Acting President

Vacant
Vice President

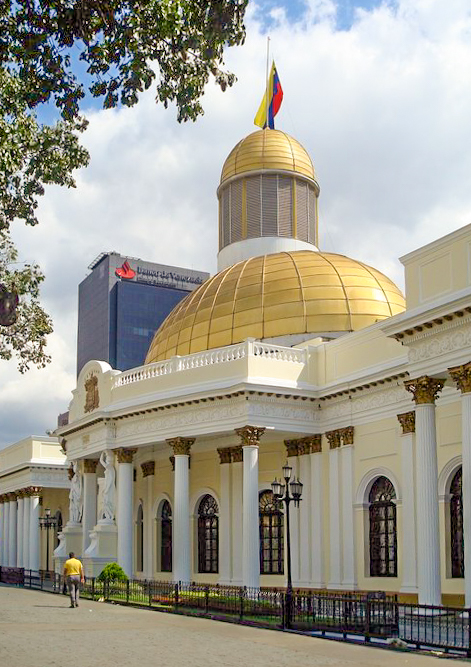
The National Assembly of Venezuela building

Two major blocs of political parties are in Venezuela; the incumbent leftist bloc United Socialist Party of Venezuela (PSUV), its major allies Fatherland for All (PPT) and the Communist Party of Venezuela (PCV), and the opposition bloc grouped into the electoral coalition Mesa de la Unidad Democrática. This includes A New Era (UNT) together with allied parties Project Venezuela, Justice First, Movement for Socialism (MAS) and others.

The Venezuelan president is elected by a vote, with direct and universal suffrage, and is both head of state and head of government. The term of office is six years. As of February 2009, a president may be re-elected an unlimited number of times. The president appoints the vice president, decides the size and composition of the cabinet, and makes appointments to it with the involvement of the legislature. The president can ask the legislature to reconsider portions of laws they find objectionable, but a simple parliamentary majority can override these objections. The president may ask the National Assembly to pass an enabling act granting the ability to rule by decree in specified policy areas. This requires a two-thirds majority in the Assembly. Since 1959, six Venezuelan presidents have been granted such powers.

The unicameral Venezuelan parliament is the Asamblea Nacional ("National Assembly"). The number of members is variable – each state and the Capital district elect three representatives, plus the result of dividing the state's population by 1.1% of the country's population. Three seats are reserved for representatives of Venezuela's Indigenous peoples. For the 2011–2016 period, the number of seats is 165. All deputies serve five-year terms.

The legal system of Venezuela belongs to the continental law tradition. The highest judicial body is the Supreme Tribunal of Justice or Tribunal Supremo de Justicia, whose magistrates are elected by parliament for a single twelve-year term. The National Electoral Council (Consejo Nacional Electoral, or CNE) is in charge of electoral processes. It is formed by five main directors elected by the National Assembly. Supreme Court president Luisa Estela Morales said in December 2009 that Venezuela had moved away from "a rigid division of powers" toward a system characterized by "intense coordination" between the branches of government. Morales clarified that each power must be independent.

In 2006, the Economist Intelligence Unit rated Venezuela an hybrid regime and the third least democratic government in Latin America on the Democracy Index. The Democracy Index downgraded Venezuela to an authoritarian regime in 2017, citing continued increasingly dictatorial behaviors by the Maduro government. The Regimes of the World index rated Venezuela as an electoral autocracy in 2024.

Since the 2026 United States intervention in Venezuela, it has been alleged that the United States effectively controls Venezuela's government as a puppet state through the US Secretary of State (SecState), who has been called the "viceroy" by some sources. Venezuela's revenues are routed through the US Treasury, where they are then given back to Venezuela with conditions on how they can be spent. Government appointments, such as the minister of defense, are run through approval from the US Secretary of State. The Executive Office of the President of the United States has controlled the public appearances and statements by the country's leader, including alleged de facto control over its foreign policy. Through control over oil sanctions, American oil companies have been provided access to Venezuela's oil reserves and pressured Venezuelan state-owned oil company PDVSA to take over assets owned by rival nations and competitors.

=== Suspension of constitutional rights ===
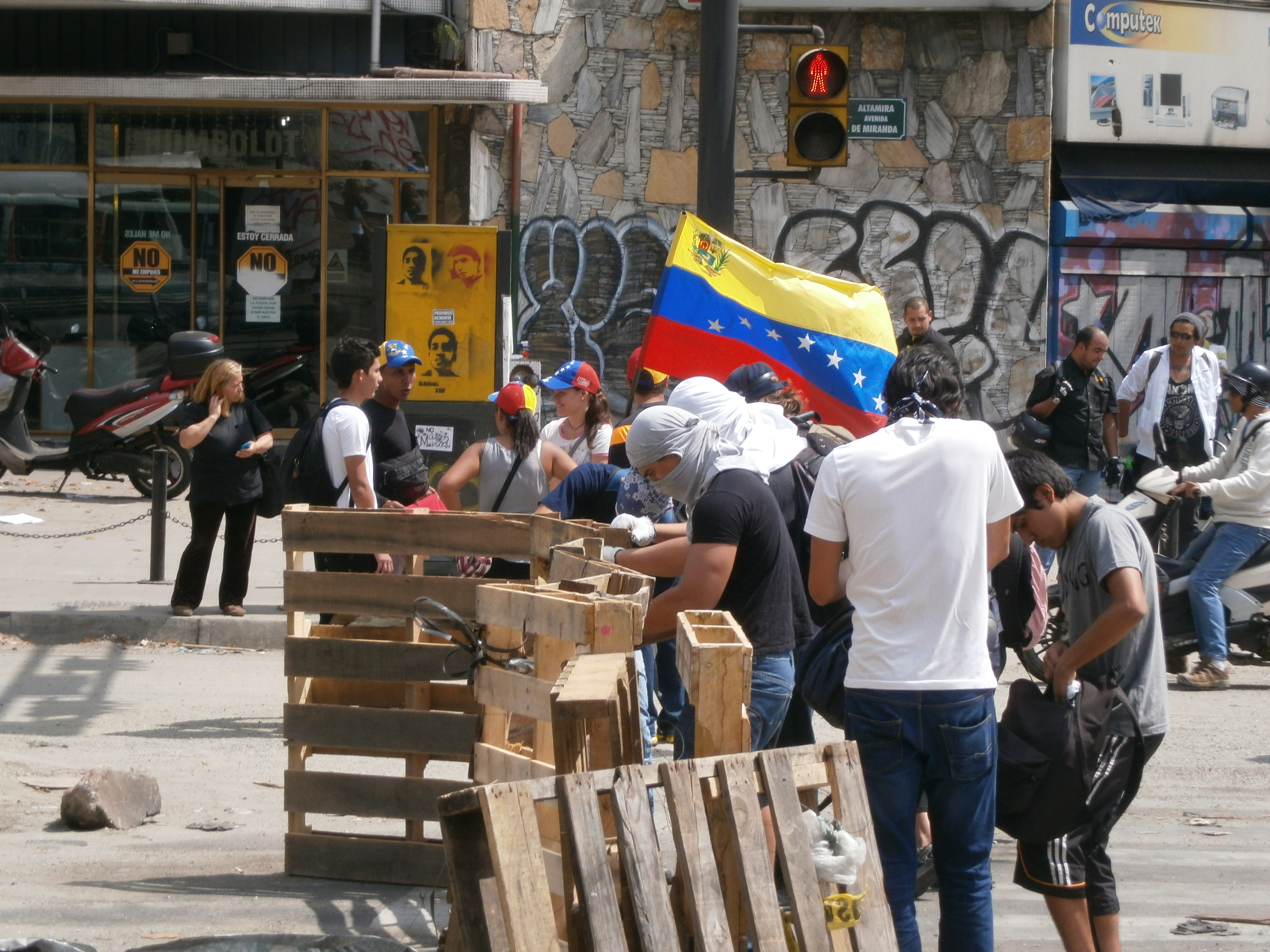
Protests in Altamira, Caracas, 2014

The 2015 parliamentary elections elected the 164 deputies and three Indigenous representatives of the National Assembly. In 2014, protests began amid hyperinflation, civil unrest, and shortages. The protests were largely peaceful. The government accused the protest of being motivated by fascists, opposition leaders, capitalism and foreign influence, President Maduro acknowledged PSUV defeat but attributed the opposition's victory to an intensification of an economic war. Despite this, Maduro said, "I will stop by hook or by crook the opposition coming to power, whatever the costs, in any way".

In the following months, Maduro fulfilled his promise of preventing the elected National Assembly from legislating. The first steps taken by PSUV and the government were the substitution of the entire Supreme Court a day after the parliamentary elections, contrary to the Constitution of Venezuela, acclaimed as fraudulent by the majority of the Venezuelan and international press. The Financial Times described the function of the Supreme Court in Venezuela as "rubber stamping executive whims and vetoing legislation". The PSUV government used this violation to suspend several elected opponents. Maduro said that "the Amnesty law (approved by the Parliament) will not be executed" and asked the Supreme Court to declare it unconstitutional.

In January 2016, Maduro approved an unconstitutional economic emergency decree, relegating to his own figure the legislative and executive powers, while also holding judiciary power through the fraudulent designation of judges the day after the election on 6 December 2015. From these events, Maduro effectively controls all three branches of government. In May 2016, constitutional guarantees were suspended when Maduro decreed the extension of the economic emergency decree for another 60 days and declared a state of emergency, which was a violation of the constitution As a result, the Organization of American States considered the application of the Inter-American Democratic Charter sanctions for non-compliance to its own constitution. In March 2017, the Venezuelan Supreme Court took over law-making powers from the National Assembly but reversed its decision the following day.

=== Administrative divisions ===
A map of the Venezuelan federation

Venezuela is divided into 23 states (estados), a capital district (distrito capital) for Caracas, and the Federal Dependencies (Dependencias Federales, a special territory). States are subdivided into 335 municipalities (municipios). These are subdivided into parishes (parroquias). The states are grouped into nine administrative regions (regiones administrativas), which were established in 1969 by presidential decree.

Venezuela maintains a claim on the territory it calls "Guayana Esequiba", the territory administered by Guyana west of the Esequibo River. In 1966, the British and Venezuelan governments signed the Geneva Agreement to resolve the conflict peacefully. The Port of Spain Protocol of 1970 set a deadline to try to resolve the issue, without success to date.

State	Capital	State	Capital
Amazonas	Puerto Ayacucho	Mérida	Mérida
Anzoátegui	Barcelona	Miranda	Los Teques
Apure	San Fernando de Apure	Monagas	Maturín
Aragua	Maracay	Nueva Esparta	La Asunción
Barinas	Barinas	Portuguesa	Guanare
Bolívar	Ciudad Bolívar	Sucre	Cumaná
Carabobo	Valencia	Táchira	San Cristóbal
Cojedes	San Carlos	Trujillo	Trujillo
Delta Amacuro	Tucupita	Yaracuy	San Felipe
Caracas	Caracas	Zulia	Maracaibo
Falcón	Coro	Vargas	La Guaira
Guárico	San Juan de los Morros	Federal Dependencies^{1}	El Gran Roque
Lara	Barquisimeto
^{1} The Federal Dependencies are not states. They are just special divisions of the territory.

=== Foreign relations ===
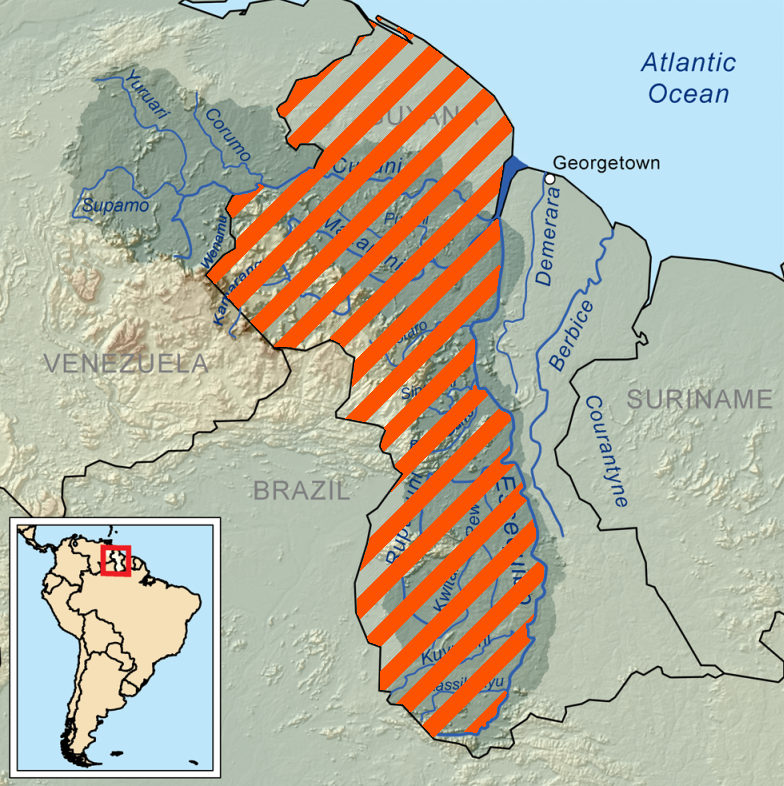
The disputed "Guayana Esequiba" claim area is a territory administered by Guyana and historically claimed by Venezuela.

Throughout most of the 20th century, Venezuela maintained friendly relations with most Latin American and Western nations. Relations with the United States government worsened in 2002 after the coup attempt during which the U.S. government recognized the short-lived interim presidency of Pedro Carmona. In 2015, Venezuela was declared a national security threat by U.S. President Barack Obama. As a result, Venezuela strengthened ties with the anti-west governments of Turkey, Russia, Iran, China, DPRK, Myanmar and Cuba.

Venezuela seeks an alternative hemispheric integration through initiatives such as the Bolivarian Alternative for the Americas trade proposal and the state-sponsored Latin American television network teleSUR. Venezuela is one of five nations in the world—along with Russia, Nicaragua, Nauru, and Syria—to have recognized the independence of Abkhazia and South Ossetia. Venezuela was a proponent of OAS's decision to adopt its Anti-Corruption Convention and is actively working in the Mercosur trade bloc to push increased trade and energy integration. Globally, it seeks a "multi-polar" world based on strengthened ties among undeveloped countries.

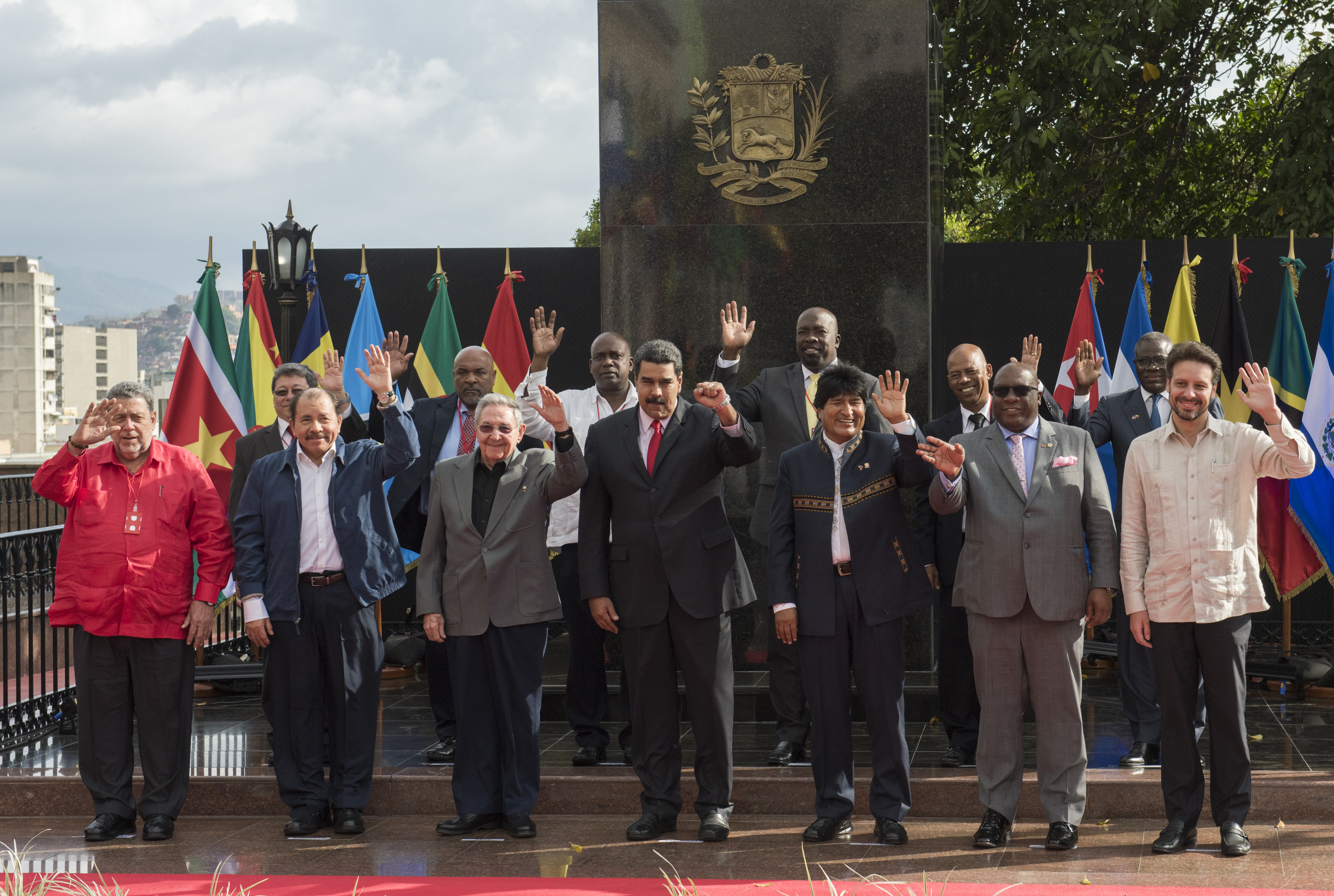
President Maduro among other Latin American leaders participating in a 2017 ALBA gathering

Venezuela is a charter member of the United Nations (UN), Organization of American States (OAS), Union of South American Nations (UNASUR), Bolivarian Alliance for the Peoples of Our America (ALBA), Mercosur, Latin American Integration Association (LAIA) and Organization of Ibero-American States (OEI).

In 2017 Venezuela announced its intention to withdraw from the OAS. It would take two years for the country to leave formally. During this period, the country was not to plan on participating in the OAS. Venezuela may suffer a deterioration of its power in international affairs if the global transition to renewable energy is completed. It is ranked 151 out of 156 countries in the index of Geopolitical Gains and Losses after energy transition.

=== Law and crime ===
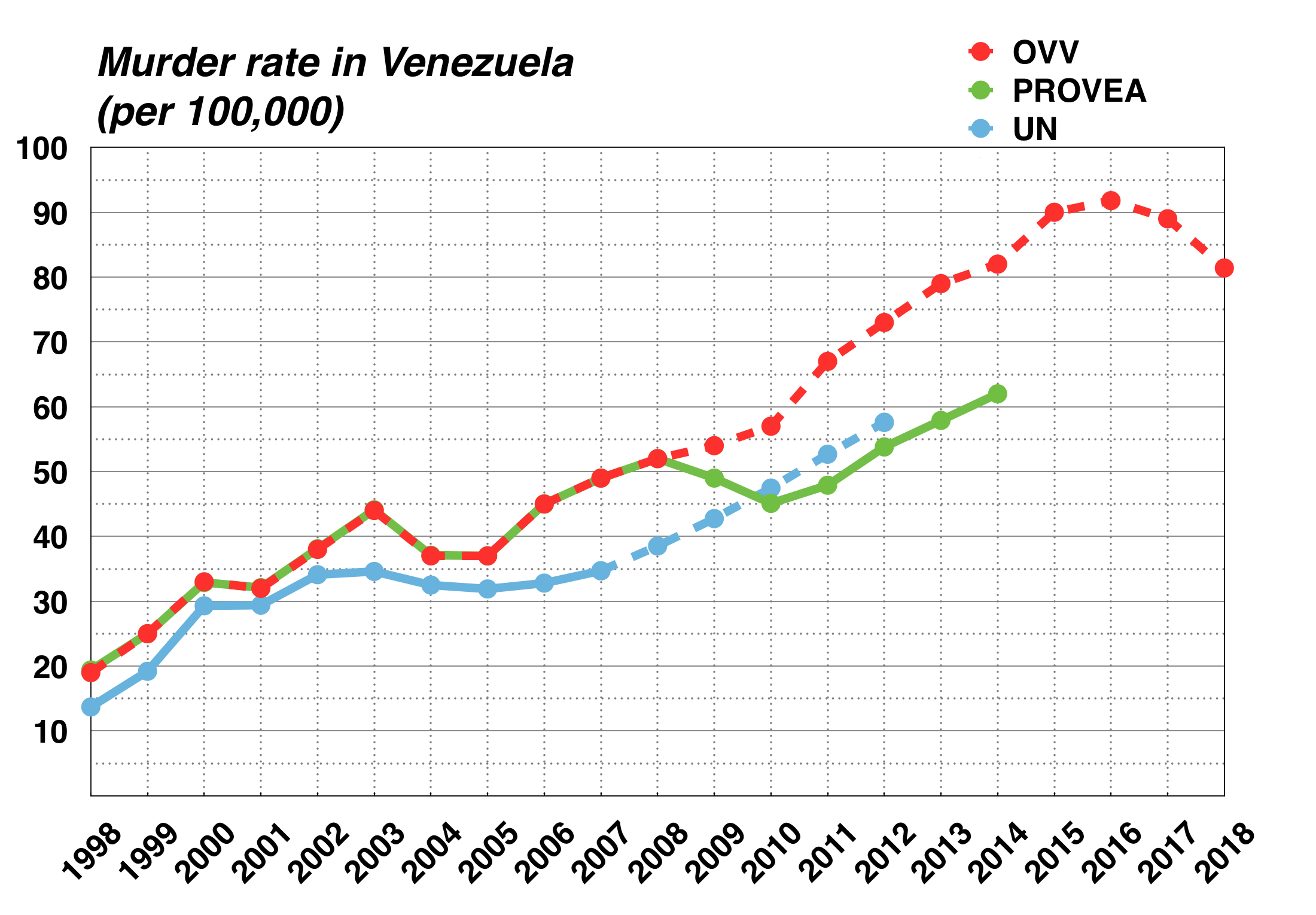
The murder rate per 100,000 citizens, 1998 to 2018.
Sources: OVV, PROVEA, UN
* UN line between 2007 and 2012 is simulated missing data.

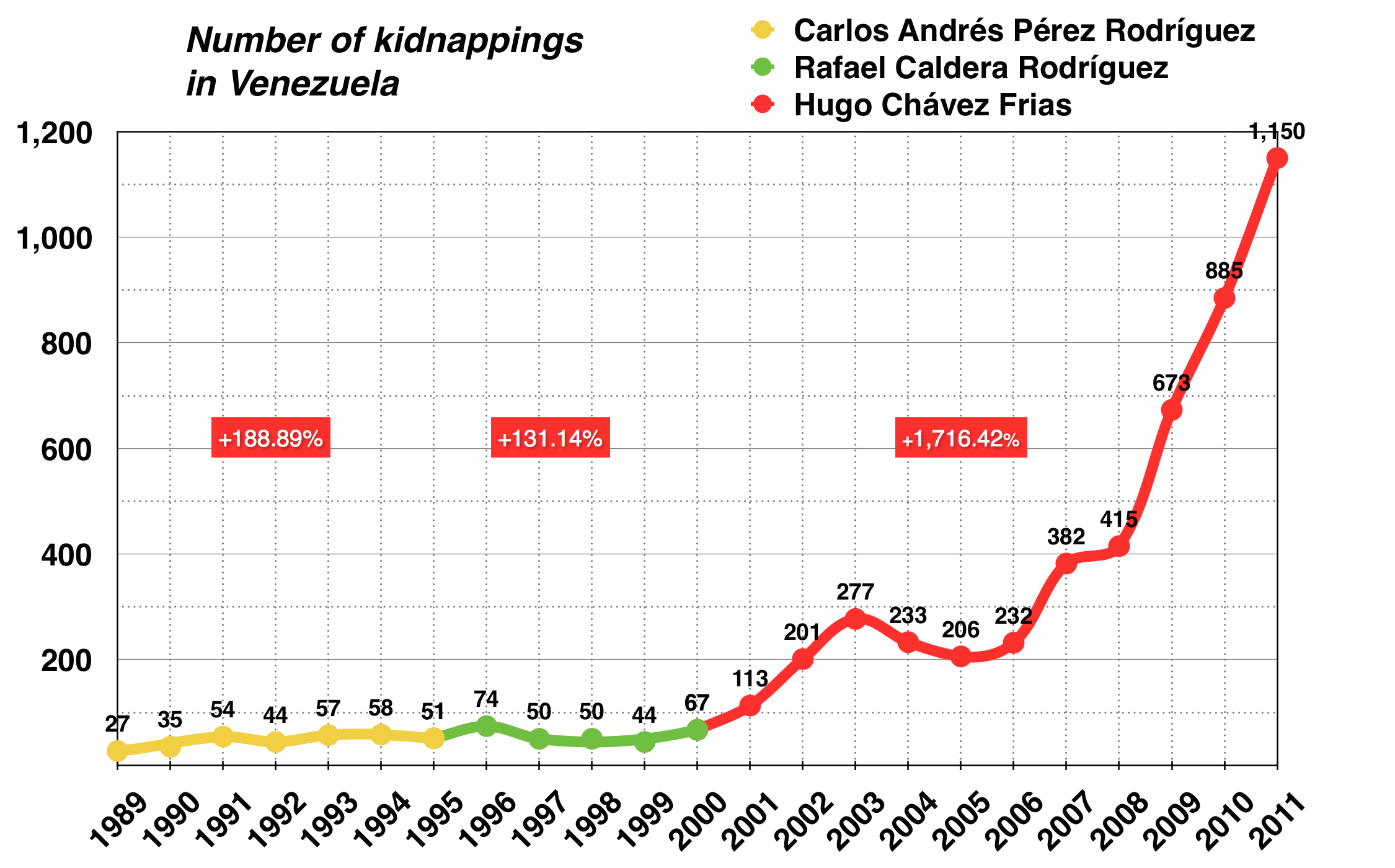
The number of kidnappings in Venezuela 1989–2011.
Source: CICPC
* Express kidnappings may not be included in data.

In Venezuela, a person is murdered every 21 minutes. Violent crimes have been so prevalent that the government no longer produces the crime data. In 2013, the homicide rate was approximately 79 per 100,000, one of the world's highest, having quadrupled in the past 15 years with over 200,000 people murdered. By 2015, it had risen to 90 per 100,000. Caracas has one of the greatest homicide rates of any large city in the world, with 122 homicides per 100,000 residents.

In 2008, polls indicated that crime was the number one concern of voters. Attempts at fighting crime such as Operation Liberation of the People were implemented to crack down on gang-controlled areas, but of reported criminal acts less than 2% are prosecuted. In 2017, the Financial Times noted that some of the arms procured by the government over the previous two decades had been diverted to paramilitary civilian groups and criminal syndicates.

Venezuela is especially dangerous for foreign travelers and investors who are visiting. The United States Department of State and the government of Canada have warned foreign visitors that they may be subjected to robbery, kidnapping and murder, and that their own diplomatic travelers are required to travel in armored vehicles. The United Kingdom's Foreign and Commonwealth Office has advised against all travel to Venezuela. Visitors have been murdered during robberies.

There are approximately 33 prisons holding about 50,000 inmates. The prison system is heavily overcrowded; its facilities have capacity for only 14,000 prisoners.

=== Human rights ===
Human rights organizations such as Human Rights Watch and Amnesty International have increasingly criticized Venezuela's human rights record, with the former organization noting in 2017 that the Chavez and subsequently the Maduro government have increasingly concentrated power in the executive branch, eroded constitutional human rights protections and allowed the government to persecute and repress its critics and opposition. Other persistent concerns as noted by the report included poor prison conditions, the continuous harassment of independent media and human rights defenders by the government.

=== Corruption ===
The United States Department of Justice's 2020 graphic titled Corrupt Venezuelan Regime

Corruption in Venezuela is high by global standards and was so for much of the 20th century. The discovery of oil worsened political corruption. By the late 1970s, Juan Pablo Pérez Alfonso's description of oil as "the Devil's excrement" had become a common expression in Venezuela. The Corruption Perceptions Index has ranked Venezuela as one of the most corrupt countries since the survey started in 1995. The 2010 ranking placed Venezuela at 164 out of 178 ranked countries in government transparency. By 2016, the rank had increased to 166 out of 178. The World Justice Project ranked Venezuela 99th out of 99 countries surveyed in its 2014 Rule of Law Index.

This corruption is shown with Venezuela's significant involvement in drug trafficking, with Colombian cocaine and other drugs transiting Venezuela towards the United States and Europe. In the period 2003–2008, authorities seized the fifth-largest total quantity of cocaine in the world. In 2006, the Oficina Nacional Antidrogas was incorporated into the office of the vice-president. However, many major government and military officials have been known for their involvement with drug trafficking.

== Economy ==
Annual variation of real GDP according to the Central Bank of Venezuela (2016 preliminary) View source data.

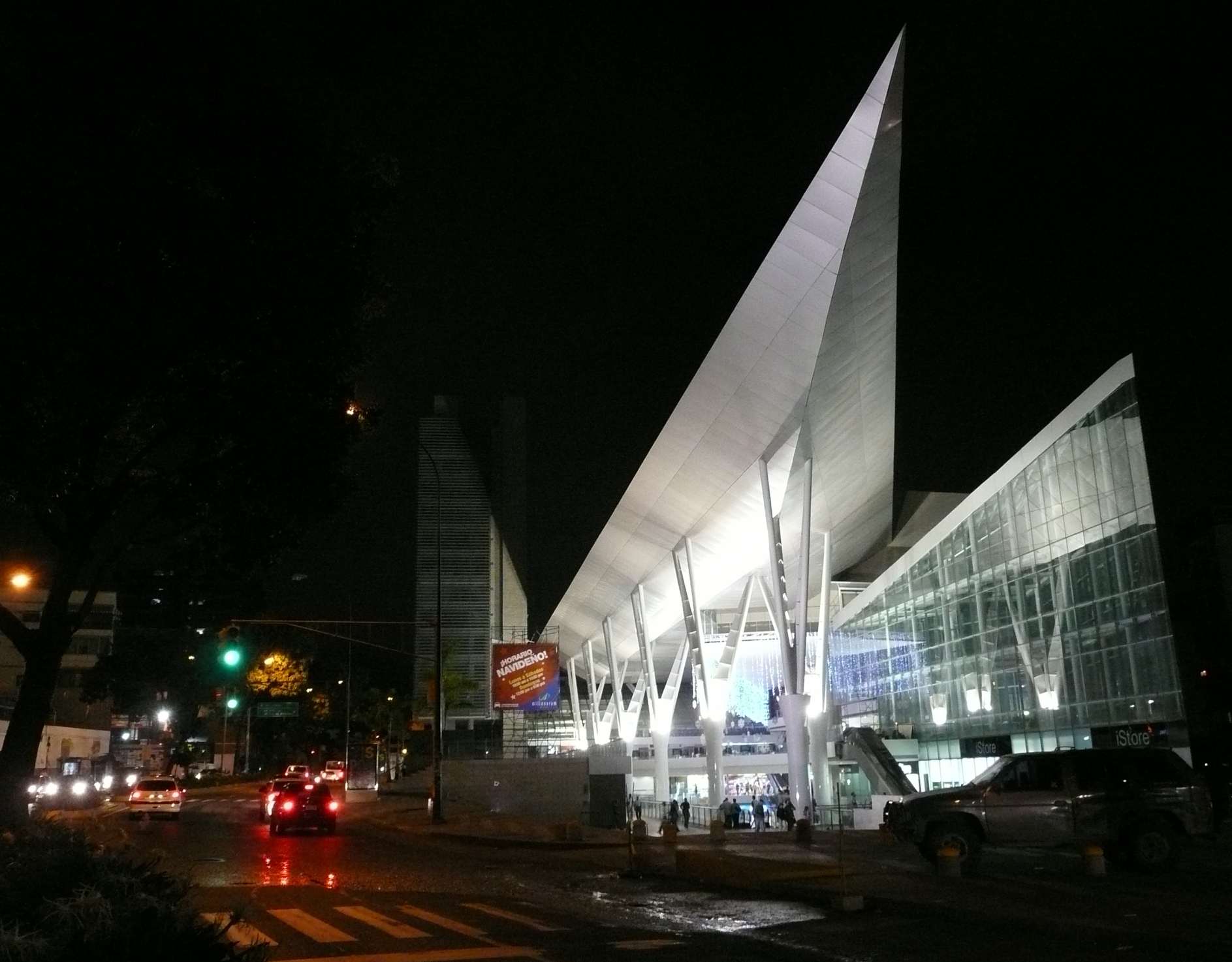
Millennium Mall, one of the main shopping centers in Caracas

Almost 82 per cent of Venezuelans live in poverty, with 53 per cent in extreme poverty, unable to buy even basic foodstuffs.

– A UN special rapporteur said in February 2024 after visiting the country.

Venezuela has a market-based mixed economy dominated by the petroleum sector, which accounts for roughly a third of GDP, around 80% of exports, and more than half of government revenues. Per capita GDP for 2016 was estimated at US$15,100, ranking 109th in the world. Historically, Venezuela had the least expensive petrol in the world because the consumer price of petrol was heavily subsidized. The private sector controls two-thirds of Venezuela's economy. Venezuela was ranked 136th out of 139 ranks in the Global Innovation Index in 2025. At least 5% of Venezuela's economy, as of 2022, relied on remittances.

The Central Bank of Venezuela is responsible for developing monetary policy for the Venezuelan bolívar which is used as currency. The president of the Central Bank of Venezuela serves as the country's representative in the International Monetary Fund. The U.S.-based conservative think tank the Heritage Foundation claims Venezuela has the weakest property rights in the world, scoring only 5.0 on a scale of 100. Expropriation without compensation is not uncommon.

As of 2011, more than 60% of Venezuela's international reserves was in gold, eight times more than the average for the region. Most of its gold held abroad was located in London. In November 2011, the first of US$11 billion of repatriated gold bullion arrived in Caracas. Chávez called the repatriation of gold a "sovereign" step that would help protect the country's foreign reserves from the turmoil in the U.S. and Europe. Government policies quickly spent down this returned gold, and in 2013 the government was forced to add the dollar reserves of state-owned companies to those of the national bank to reassure the international bond market.

Manufacturing contributed 17% of GDP in 2006. Venezuela manufactures and exports heavy industry products such as steel, aluminium and cement, with production concentrated around Ciudad Guayana, near the Guri Dam, one of the largest in the world and the provider of about three-quarters of Venezuela's electricity. Other notable manufacturing includes electronics and automobiles, as well as beverages, and foodstuffs. Agriculture in Venezuela accounts for approximately 3% of GDP, 10% of the labor force, and at least a quarter of land area.

Since the discovery of oil in the early 20th century, Venezuela has been one of the world's leading exporters of oil, and it is a founding member of the OPEC cartel. Previously an underdeveloped exporter of agricultural commodities, oil quickly came to dominate exports and government revenues. The 1980s oil glut led to an external debt crisis and a long-running economic crisis, which saw inflation peak at 100% in 1996. The 1990s also saw Venezuela experience a major banking crisis in 1994.

The recovery of oil prices after 2001 boosted the economy and facilitated social spending. With social programs such as the Bolivarian Missions, Venezuela initially made progress in social development in the 2000s, particularly in areas such as health, education, and poverty. Many of the social policies pursued by the Chávez administration were jump-started by the Millennium Development Goals, eight goals that Venezuela and 188 other nations agreed to in September 2000. The sustainability of the Bolivarian Missions has been questioned due to the Bolivarian state's overspending on public works and because the Chávez government did not save funds for future economic hardships, with economic issues and poverty rising as a result of their policies in the 2010s.

In 2003, the government implemented currency controls after capital flight led to a devaluation of the currency. This led to the development of a parallel market of dollars in the subsequent years. The Great Recession led to a renewed economic downturn. Despite controversial data shared by the Venezuelan government showing that the country had halved malnutrition following one of the UN's Millennium Development Goals, shortages of staple goods began to occur in Venezuela and malnutrition began to increase. In early 2013, Venezuela devalued its currency due to shortages, including necessities such as toilet paper, milk, and flour. Fears rose so high due to the toilet paper shortage that the government occupied a toilet paper factory and continued plans to nationalize other industrial aspects like food distribution. Bond ratings have also decreased multiple times in 2013 due to decisions by the president Nicolás Maduro. In 2016, consumer prices increased 800%, and the economy declined by 18.6%, entering an economic depression. The outlook was deemed negative by most bond-rating services in 2017. For 2018 an inflation rate of 1,000,000 percent was projected, putting Venezuela in a similar situation to that in Germany in 1923 or Zimbabwe in the late 2000s.

"The formerly rich petro-state has seen GDP fall by 80 percent in less than a decade, driving some seven million of its citizens to flee. Most Venezuelans live on just a few dollars a month, with the health care and education systems in total disrepair and biting shortages of electricity and fuel" as of 2024, according to VOA (report from AFP).

=== Tourism ===
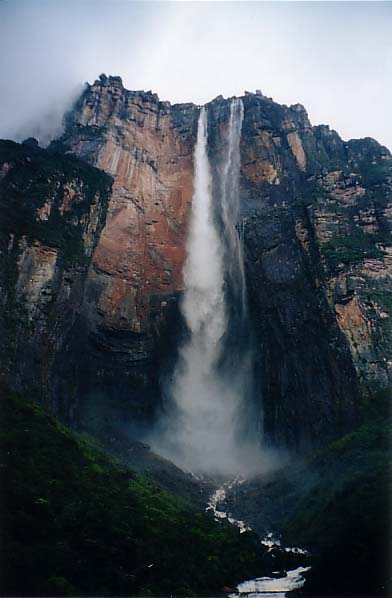
Ángel Falls in Canaima National Park is the world's highest waterfall.

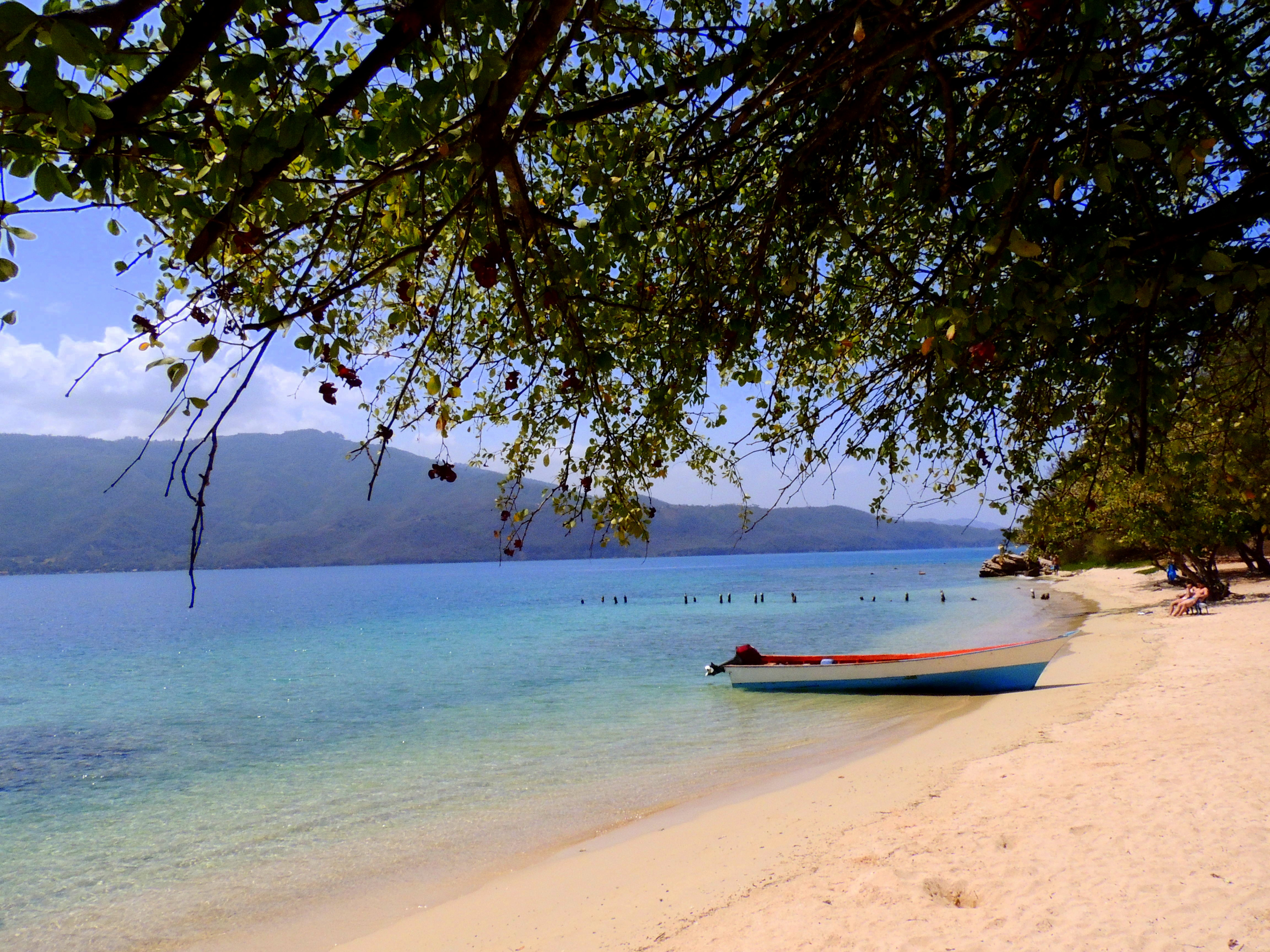
Mochima National Park, eastern Venezuela

Tourism has been developed considerably in recent decades, particularly because of its favorable geographical position, the variety of landscapes, the richness of plant and wildlife, the culture and the tropical climate. Margarita Island is one of the top tourist destinations. It is an island with a modern infrastructure, bordered by beaches suitable for extreme sports, and features castles, fortresses and churches of great cultural value. Los Roques Archipelago is made up of a set of islands and keys that constitute one of the main tourist attractions in the country. With exotic crystalline beaches, Morrocoy is a national park, formed by small keys very close to the mainland, which have grown rapidly as one of the greatest tourist attractions in the Venezuelan Caribbean.

Canaima National Park extends over 30,000 km^{2} (12,000 sq mi) to the border with Guyana and Brazil; it is considered the sixth largest national park in the world. Its steep cliffs and waterfalls (including Angel Falls, which is the highest waterfall in the world, at 1,002 m) form spectacular landscapes. The state of Mérida is one of the main tourist centers of Venezuela. Starting from Mérida is the longest and highest cable car in the world, which reaches the Pico Espejo of 4,765 m.

=== Shortages ===
Shortages in Venezuela have been prevalent following the enactment of price controls and other policies during the economic policy of the Hugo Chávez government. Under the economic policy of the Nicolás Maduro government, greater shortages occurred due to the policy of withholding United States dollars from importers with price controls.

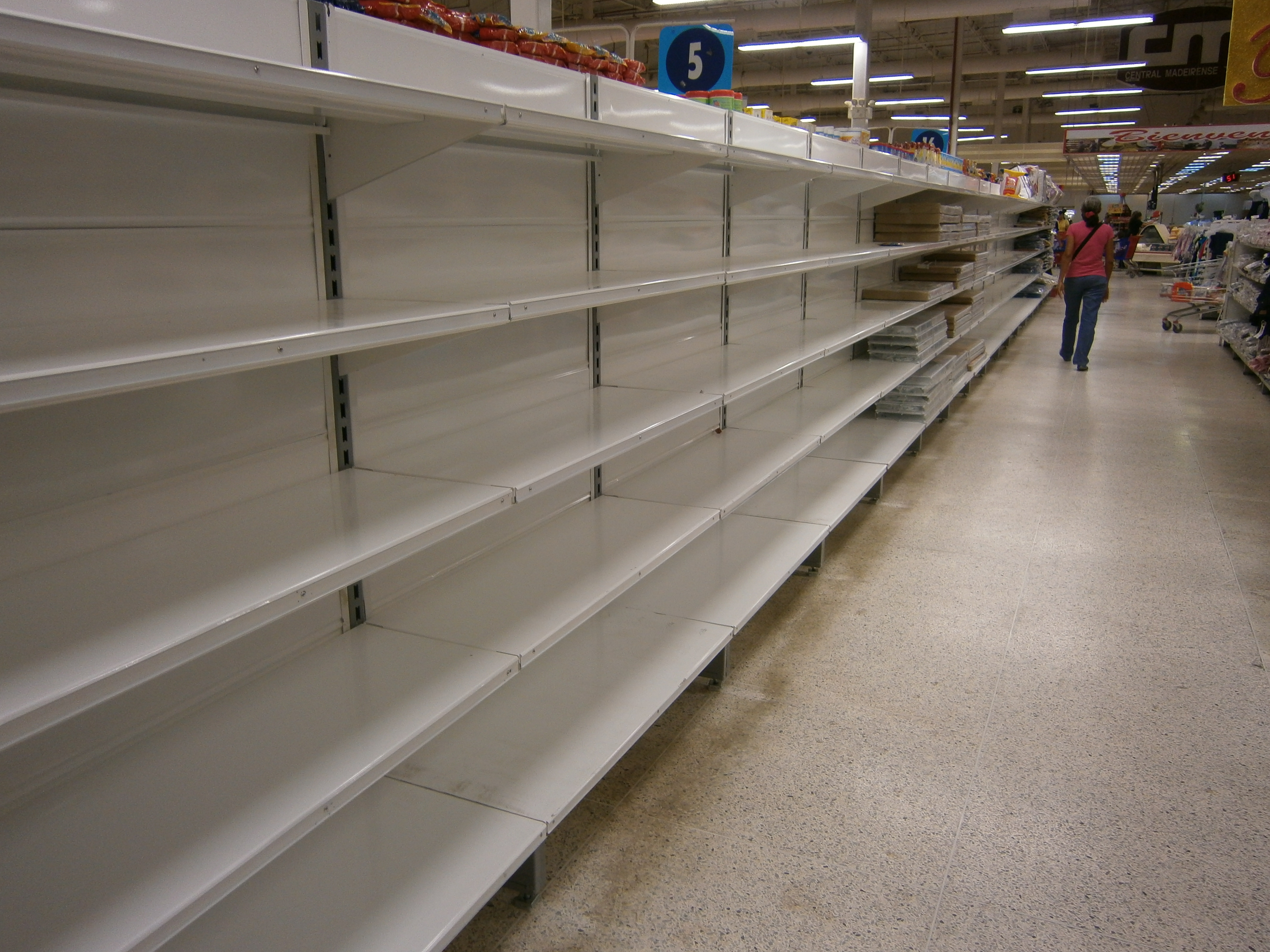
Empty shelves in a store in Venezuela due to shortages in 2014

Shortages occur in regulated products, such as milk, various types of meat, coffee, rice, oil, flour, butter, and other goods including basic necessities like toilet paper, personal hygiene products, and even medicine. As a result of the shortages, Venezuelans must search for food, wait in lines for hours and sometimes do without certain products.

A drought, combined with a lack of planning and maintenance, caused a hydroelectricity shortage. To deal with lack of power supply, in April 2016 the Maduro government announced rolling blackouts and reduced the government workweek to only Monday and Tuesday. A multi-university study found that in 2016 alone, about 75% of Venezuelans lost weight due to hunger, with the average losing about 8.6 kg (19 lbs) due to the lack of food. In March 2017, there were shortages of gasoline in some regions.

=== Petroleum and other resources ===
Venezuela is estimated to have more proven crude oil reserves than any other country.

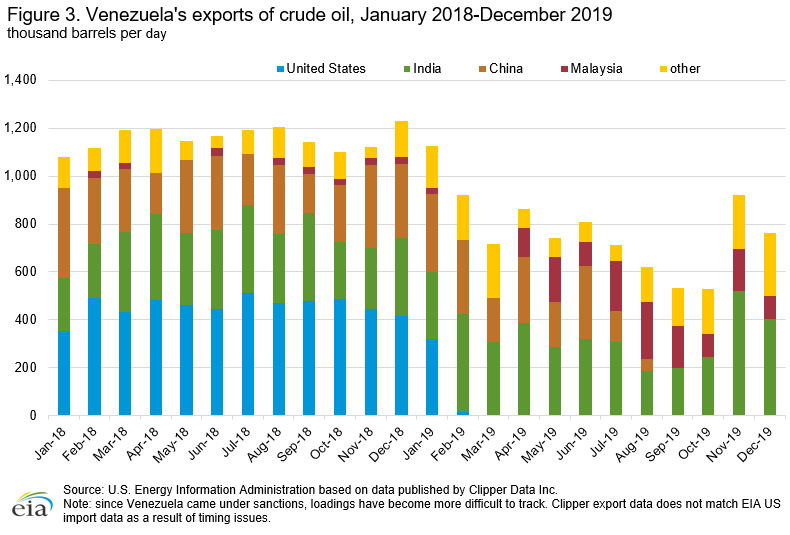
Venezuela's exports of crude oil from January 2018 to December 2019

Venezuela's main petroleum deposits are located around and beneath Lake Maracaibo, the Gulf of Venezuela (both in Zulia), and in the Orinoco Basin, where the largest reserve is located. Compared to 2009, another 40.4% in crude oil reserves were proven in 2010, allowing Venezuela to surpass Saudi Arabia as the country with the largest reserves of this type. Besides having the largest conventional oil reserves and the second-largest natural gas reserves in the Western Hemisphere, Venezuela has non-conventional oil deposits, in the form of extra-heavy crude oil, bitumen and tar sands, approximately equal to the world's reserves of conventional oil. The electricity sector in Venezuela is one of the few to rely primarily on hydropower, and includes the Guri Dam, one of the largest in the world.

In the first half of the 20th century, U.S. oil companies were heavily involved in Venezuela, initially interested only in purchasing concessions. In 1943, a new government introduced a 50/50 split in profits between the government and the oil industry. In 1960, with a newly installed democratic government, Hydrocarbons Minister Juan Pablo Pérez Alfonso led the creation of OPEC, the consortium of oil-producing countries aiming to support the price of oil.

In 1973, Venezuela voted to nationalize its oil industry outright, effective 1 January 1976, with Petróleos de Venezuela (PDVSA) taking over and presiding over a number of holding companies; in subsequent years, Venezuela built a vast refining and marketing system in the U.S. and Europe. In the 1990s, PDVSA became more independent from the government and presided over an apertura (opening) in which it invited in foreign investment. Under Hugo Chávez a 2001 law placed limits on foreign investment. PDVSA played a key role in the December 2002 – February 2003 national strike. As a result of the strike, around 40% of the company's workforce, around 18,000 workers, were dismissed.

=== Transport ===
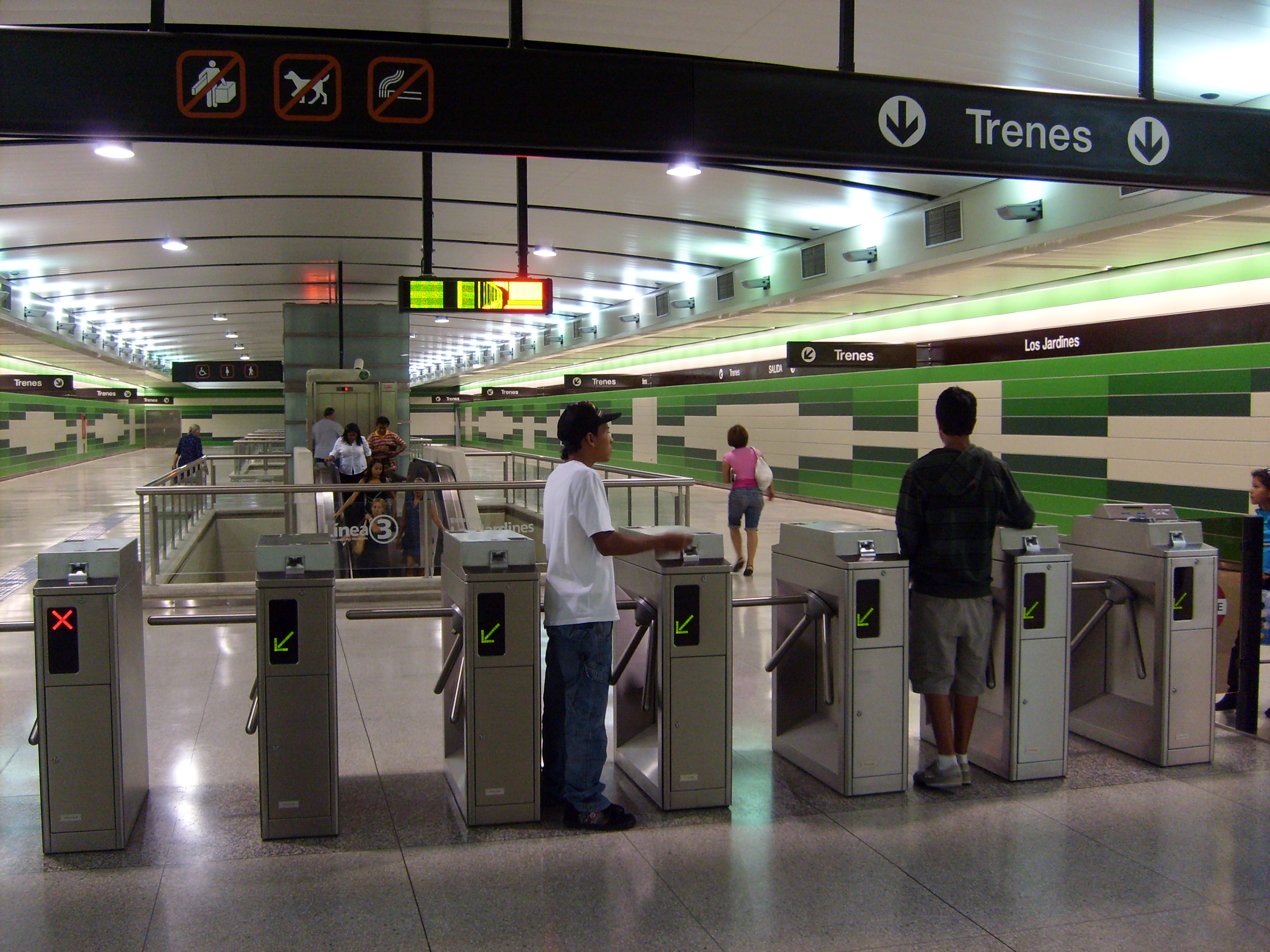
Caracas Metro in Los Jardines Station

Venezuela's airports include the Simón Bolívar International Airport in Maiquetía and La Chinita International Airport near Maracaibo. Major seaports are at La Guaira, Maracaibo and Puerto Cabello. In the south and east, the Amazon rainforest region has limited cross-border transport. In the west, there is a mountainous border of over 2,213 kilometres (1,375 mi) shared with Colombia. The Orinoco River is navigable by oceangoing vessels up to 400 kilometres (250 mi) inland and connects the major industrial city of Ciudad Guayana to the Atlantic Ocean.

Venezuela has a limited national railway system, which has no active rail connections to other countries. The Chávez administration tried to invest in expanding it, but the rail project was put on hold due to debt. Several major cities have metro systems. The Caracas Metro has been operating since 1983. The Maracaibo Metro and Valencia Metro were opened more recently. Venezuela has a road network of nearly 100,000 kilometres (62,000 mi), placing it around 45th in the world. Around a third of roads are paved.

=== Utilities ===
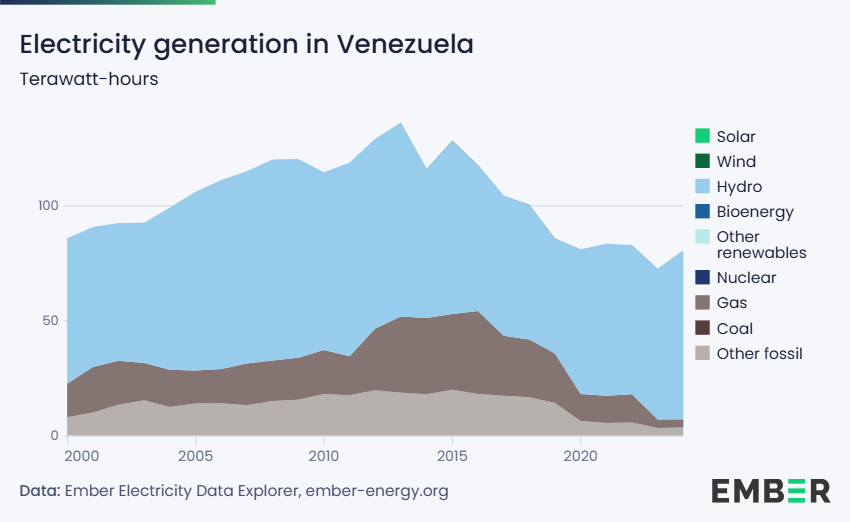
Electricity generation in Venezuela in terawatt-hours

The electricity sector in Venezuela is heavily dependent on hydroelectricity, with this energy source accounting for 64% of the country's electricity generation in 2021. The country relies on six hydroelectric plants, with Central Hidroeléctrica Guri providing the majority of this capacity. In 2021, natural gas and petroleum contributed 25% and 11% to electricity generation, respectively. Managed by CORPOELEC, the sector has declined due to outdated infrastructure and insufficient investment, reducing generation from 120 billion kWh in 2013 to 95 billion kWh in 2021. Despite a 99% electrification rate in 2019, frequent power outages have worsened, peaking with a nationwide blackout in 2019 and increasing by 22% from 2021 to 2022. Fuel shortages have also hampered power plant operations.

== Demographics ==
Venezuela is among the most urbanized countries in Latin America. About 93% of the population lives in urban areas in northern Venezuela, especially in Caracas, which is the largest city. 73% of people live less than 100 kilometres (62 mi) from the coastline. Though almost half the land area lies south of the Orinoco, only 5% of Venezuelans live there. The largest and most important city south of the Orinoco is Ciudad Guayana, which is the sixth most populous conurbation. Other major cities include Barquisimeto, Valencia, Maracay, Maracaibo, Barcelona-Puerto La Cruz, Mérida and San Cristóbal.

According to the 2022 revision of the World Population Prospects the total population was 28,199,867 in 2021, representing a significant increase from 5,482,000 in 1950. A 2014 study by sociologists of the Central University of Venezuela found over 1.5 million Venezuelans, or about 4% to 6% of the country's population, had left Venezuela since 1999. By late 2025, the UNHCR reported approximately 7.9 million Venezuelan refugees and migrants living worldwide, with the vast majority in Latin America.

=== Largest cities ===
Largest cities or towns in Venezuela
Rank	Name	State	Pop.	Rank	Name	State	Pop.
1	Caracas	Capital District	2,904,376	11	Ciudad Bolívar	Bolívar	342,280
2	Maracaibo	Zulia	1,906,205	12	San Cristóbal	Táchira	263,765
3	Valencia	Carabobo	1,396,322	13	Cabimas	Zulia	263,056
4	Barquisimeto	Lara	996,230	14	Los Teques	Miranda	252,242
5	Ciudad Guayana	Bolívar	706,736	15	Puerto la Cruz	Anzoátegui	244,728
6	Maturín	Monagas	542,259	16	Punto Fijo	Falcón	239,444
7	Barcelona	Anzoátegui	421,424	17	Mérida	Mérida	217,547
8	Maracay	Aragua	407,109	18	Guarenas	Miranda	209,987
9	Cumaná	Sucre	358,919	19	Ciudad Ojeda	Zulia	203,435
10	Barinas	Barinas	353.851	20	Guanare	Portuguesa	192,644

=== Ethnicity ===
Racial groups in Venezuela (2011 census):
1. Moreno (51.6%)
2. White (43.6%)
3. Black (3.60%)
4. Others (1.20%)

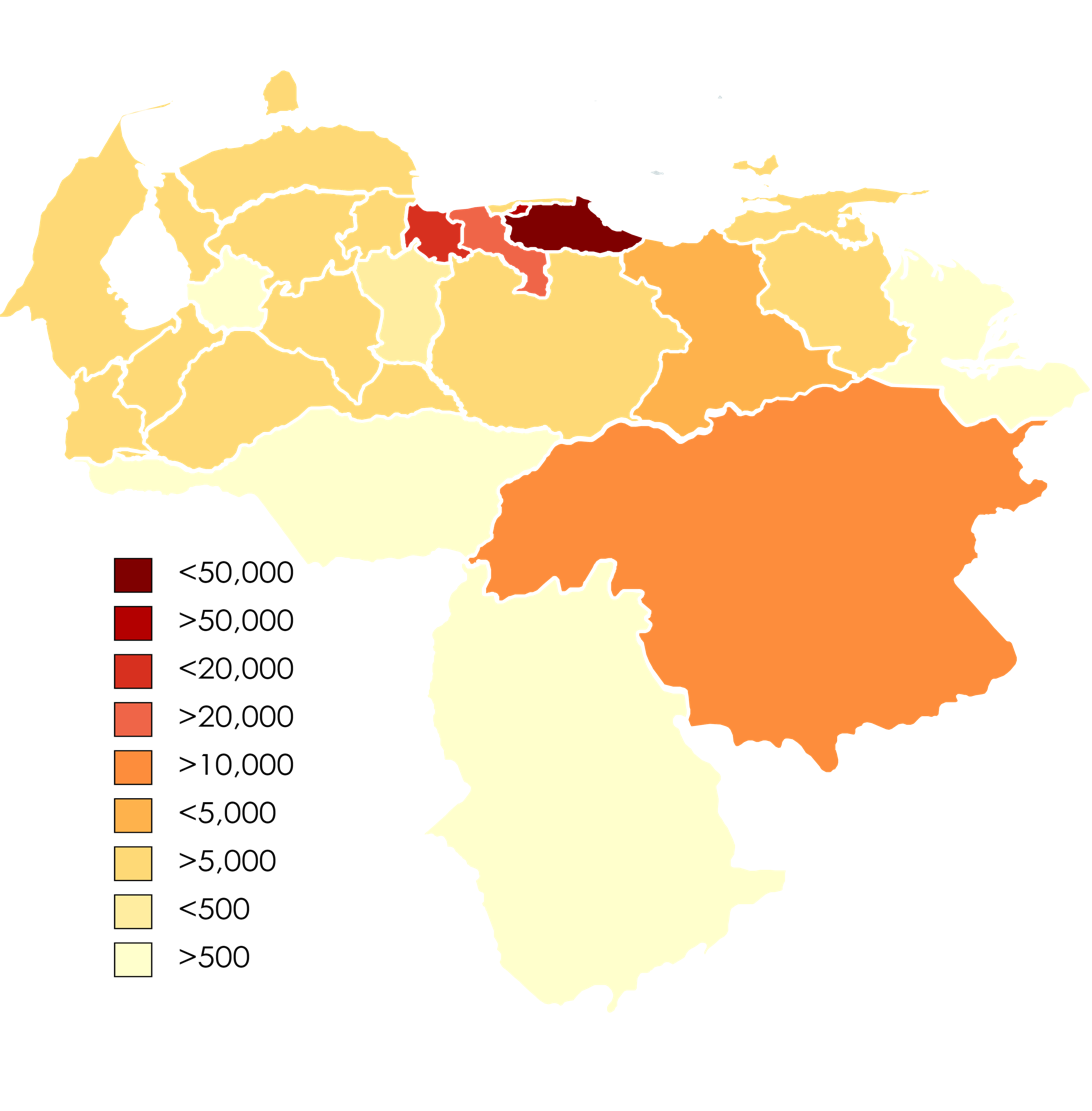
A map showing the proportion of the Venezuelan population with Spanish nationality or people who are residing in Venezuela which are declared as Spanish or people with declared Iberian Spanish ancestry

The people of Venezuela come from a variety of ancestries. It is estimated that the majority of the population is of pardo, or mixed, ethnic ancestry. In the 2011 census, which Venezuelans were asked to identify themselves according to their customs and ancestry, the term pardo was excluded from the answers. The majority claimed to be moreno or white—51.6% and 43.6%, respectively. Slightly more than half of the population claimed to be moreno, a term used throughout Ibero-America that in this case means "dark-skinned" or "brown-skinned", as opposed to having a lighter skin. Ethnic minorities in Venezuela consist of groups that descend mainly from African or Indigenous peoples. 2.8% identified themselves as "black" and 0.7% as afrodescendiente (Afro-descendant), 2.6% claimed to belong to Indigenous peoples, and 1.2% answered "other races". Among Indigenous people, 58% were Wayúu, 7% Warao, 5% Kariña, 4% Pemón, 3% Piaroa, 3% Jivi, 3% Añú, 3% Cumanágoto, 2% Yukpa, 2% Chaima and 1% Yanomami; the remaining 9% consisted of other Indigenous nations. According to an autosomal DNA study conducted in 2008 by the University of Brasília, the composition of Venezuela's population is 60.60% European, 23% Indigenous, and 16.30% African.

During the colonial period and until after the Second World War, many of the European immigrants to Venezuela came from the Canary Islands and Spain with a relevant amount of Galicians and Asturians. These immigrants from Spain had a significant cultural impact on the cuisine and customs of Venezuela. These influences on Venezuela have led to the nation being called the 8th island of the Canaries. With the start of oil exploitation in the early 20th century, companies from the United States began establishing operations in Venezuela, bringing with them U.S. citizens. Later, during and after the war, new waves of immigrants from other parts of Europe, the Middle East, and China began; many were encouraged by government-established immigration programs and lenient immigration policies. During the 20th century, Venezuela, along with the rest of Latin America, received millions of immigrants from Europe. This was especially true post-World War II, as a consequence of war-ridden Europe. During the 1970s, while experiencing an oil-export boom, Venezuela received millions of immigrants from Ecuador, Colombia, and the Dominican Republic. Due to the belief that this immigration influx depressed wages, some Venezuelans opposed European immigration. The Venezuelan government, however, were actively recruiting immigrants from Eastern Europe to fill a need for engineers. Millions of Colombians, as well as Middle Eastern and Haitian populations would continue immigrating to Venezuela into the early 21st century.

According to the World Refugee Survey 2008, published by the U.S. Committee for Refugees and Immigrants, Venezuela hosted a population of refugee and asylum seekers from Colombia numbering 252,200 in 2007. 10,600 new asylum seekers entered Venezuela in 2007. In 2011, between 500,000 and one million illegal immigrants were estimated to be living in the country.

In 2012, Venezuela's Indigenous population was estimated at 500 thousand people (2.8% of the total), distributed among 40 Indigenous peoples. There are three uncontacted tribes living in Venezuela. The constitution recognizes the multi-ethnic, pluri-cultural, and multilingual character of Venezuela and includes a chapter devoted to Indigenous peoples' rights, which opened up spaces for their political inclusion at national and local level in 1999. Most Indigenous peoples are concentrated in eight states along the borders with Brazil, Guyana, and Colombia. Major groups are the Wayuu in the west, the Warao in the east, the Yanomami installed in the south, and the Pemon in the southeast.

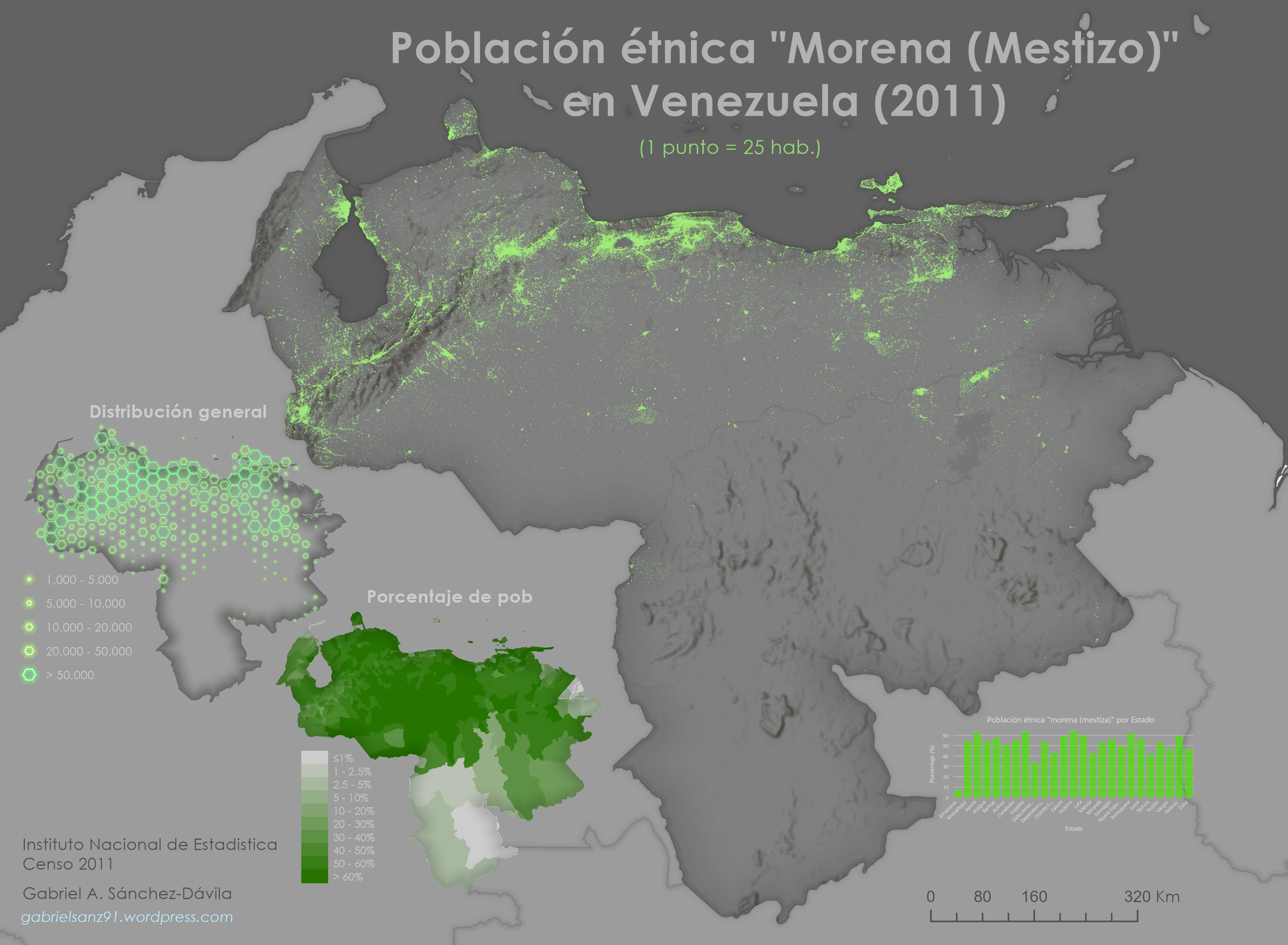
Moreno (Mestizo) population of Venezuela in 2011 (1 dot = 25 people, shading = population share, hexagons = higher concentration areas).

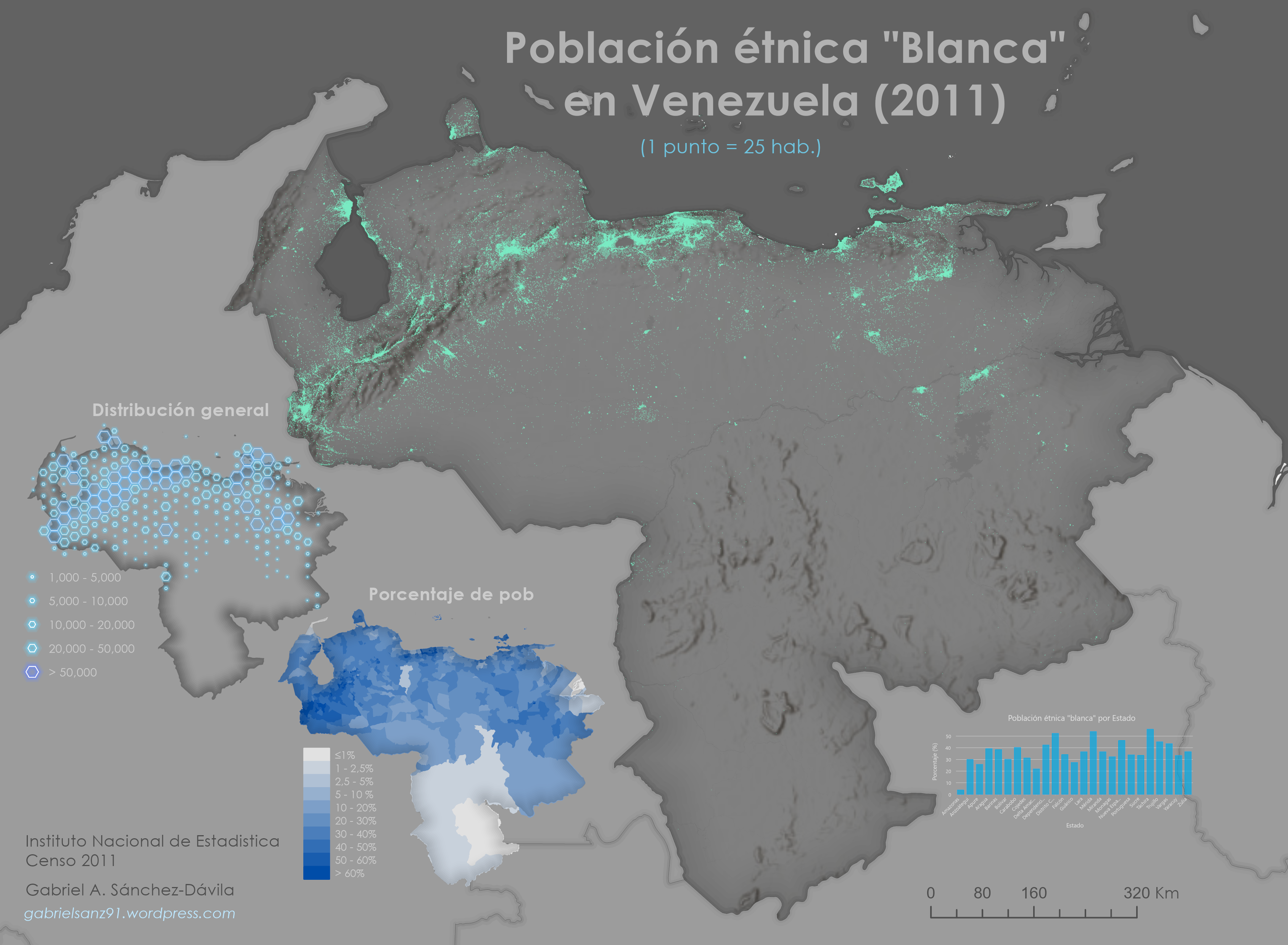
White population of Venezuela in 2011 (1 dot = 25 people, shading = population share, hexagons = higher concentration areas).

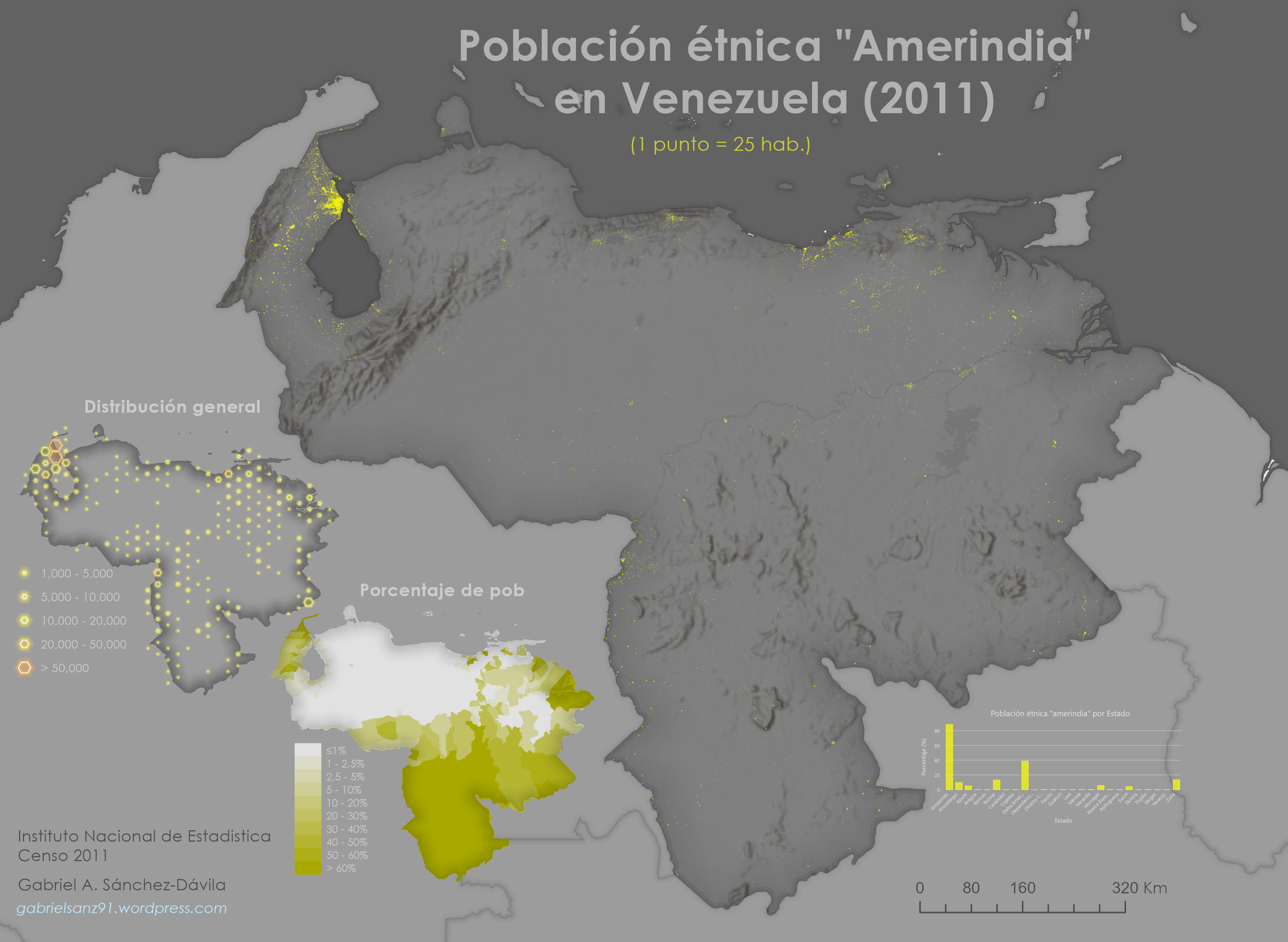
Amerindian population of Venezuela in 2011 (1 dot = 25 people, shading = population share, hexagons = higher concentration areas).

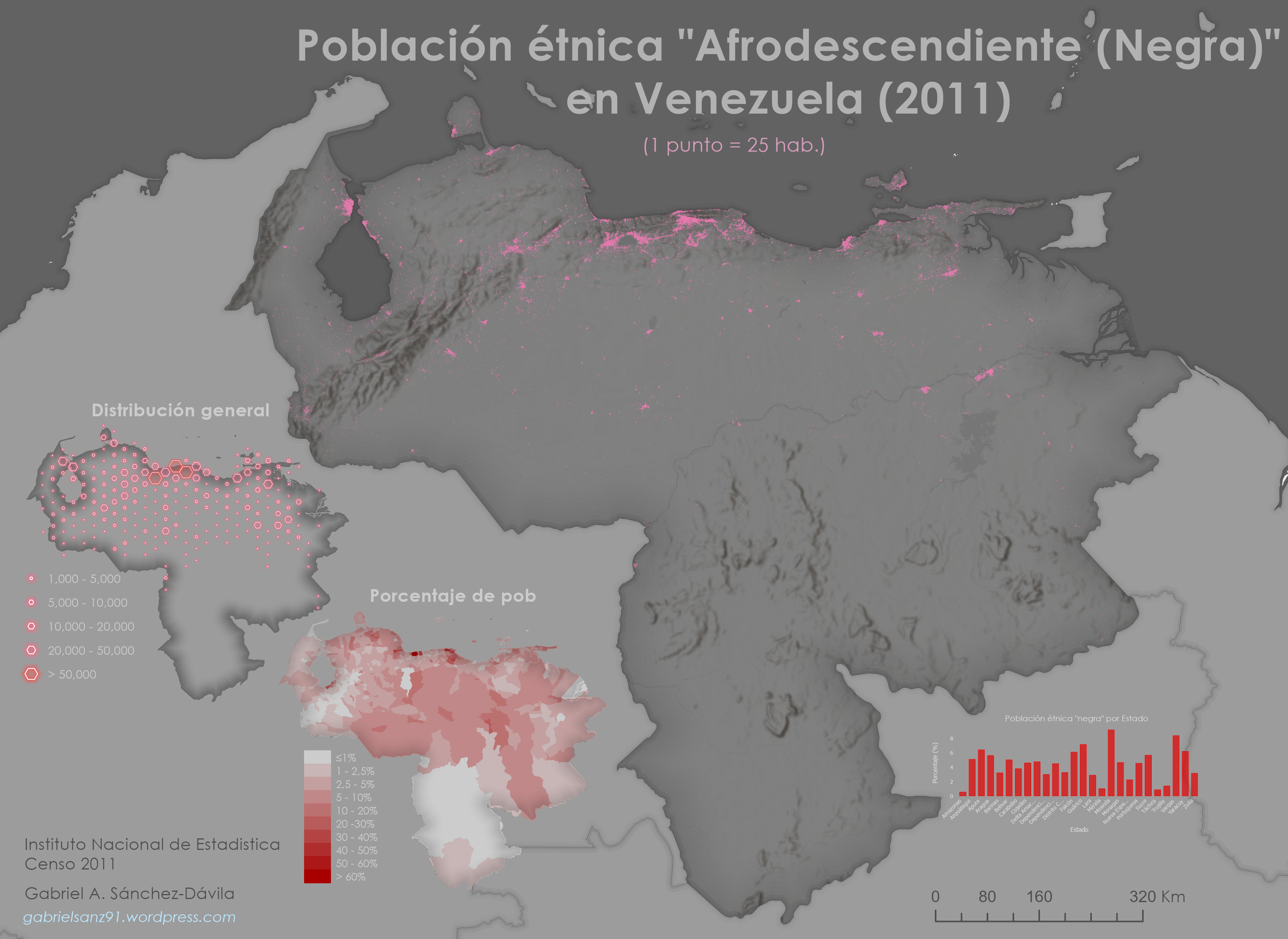
Black and Afrodescendant population of Venezuela in 2011 (1 dot = 25 people, shading = population share, hexagons = higher concentration areas).

=== Languages ===
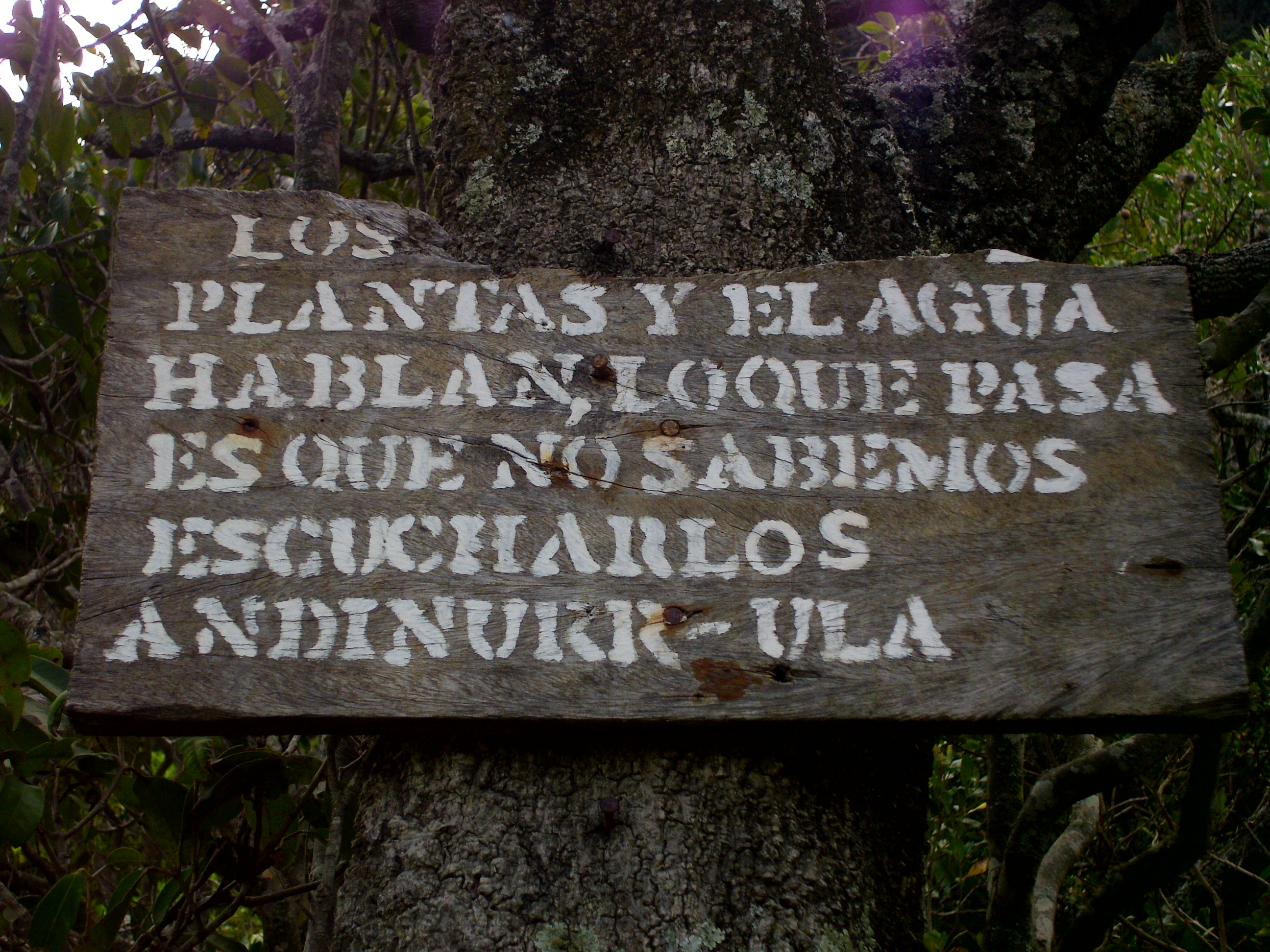
Spanish-language sign in Lara, Venezuela

Castilian Spanish (castellano) is the official language of Venezuela and is spoken natively by 97.3% of the population. Although most residents are monolingual Spanish speakers, many other languages are spoken in Venezuela. In addition to Spanish, the constitution recognizes more than thirty Indigenous languages, including Wayuu, Warao, Pemón, and many others for the official use of the Indigenous peoples, mostly with few speakers – less than 1% of the total population. Wayuu is the most spoken Indigenous language, with 170,000 speakers.

Immigrants, in addition to Spanish, speak their own languages. Chinese (400,000), Portuguese (254,000), and Italian (200,000) are the most-spoken languages after Spanish. Arabic is spoken by Lebanese and Syrian colonies on Isla de Margarita, Maracaibo, Punto Fijo, Puerto la Cruz, El Tigre, Maracay, and Caracas. Portuguese is spoken by the Portuguese community in Santa Elena de Uairén and by much of the population, due to its proximity to Brazil. The German community speaks their native language, while the people of Colonia Tovar speak mostly an Alemannic dialect of German called alemán coloniero.

English is the most widely used foreign language in demand and is spoken by many professionals, academics, and members of the upper and middle classes as a result of the oil exploration by foreign companies, and its acceptance as a lingua franca. Culturally, English is common in southern towns like El Callao, and the native English-speaking (English-creole speaking) influence is evident in folk and calypso songs from the region.

Dialects of Eastern-Caribbean English-based creoles were brought to Venezuela by Trinidadian and other British West Indies immigrants. They are collectively referred to as Venezuelan English Creole. A variety of Antillean Creole is spoken by a small community in El Callao and Paria. Italian language teaching is delivered by private Venezuelan schools and institutions. Other languages spoken by large communities in the country are Basque and Galician, among others.

=== Religion ===
Religion in Venezuela (2011):
1. Catholic (71.0%)
2. Protestant (17.0%)
3. No religion (7.00%)
4. Other religion (3.00%)
5. No answer (1.00%)

In 2011, 88% of the population was Christian, primarily Roman Catholic (71%). The remaining 17% were Protestant, primarily Evangelicals. In Latin America, Protestants are usually called "evangélicos". 8% of Venezuelans are irreligious. Almost 3% of the population follow another religion. 1% of the population practice Santería.

There are small but influential Muslim, Druze, Buddhist, and Jewish communities. The Muslim community of more than 100,000 is concentrated among persons of Lebanese and Syrian descent living in Nueva Esparta state, Punto Fijo and the Caracas area. Venezuela is home to the largest Druze communities outside the Middle East, estimated at 60,000, and concentrated among persons of Lebanese and Syrian descent. Buddhism is practiced by over 52,000 people. The Buddhist community is made up mainly of Chinese, Japanese, and Korean people.

The Jewish community has shrunk in recent years from 22,000 in 1999 to less than 7,000 in 2015, due to rising economic pressures and allegedly, according to the US-based Anti-Defamation League, to antisemitism in Venezuela. In 2010, there were 580 Hindus in Venezuela according to the Association of Religion Data Archives.

=== Health ===
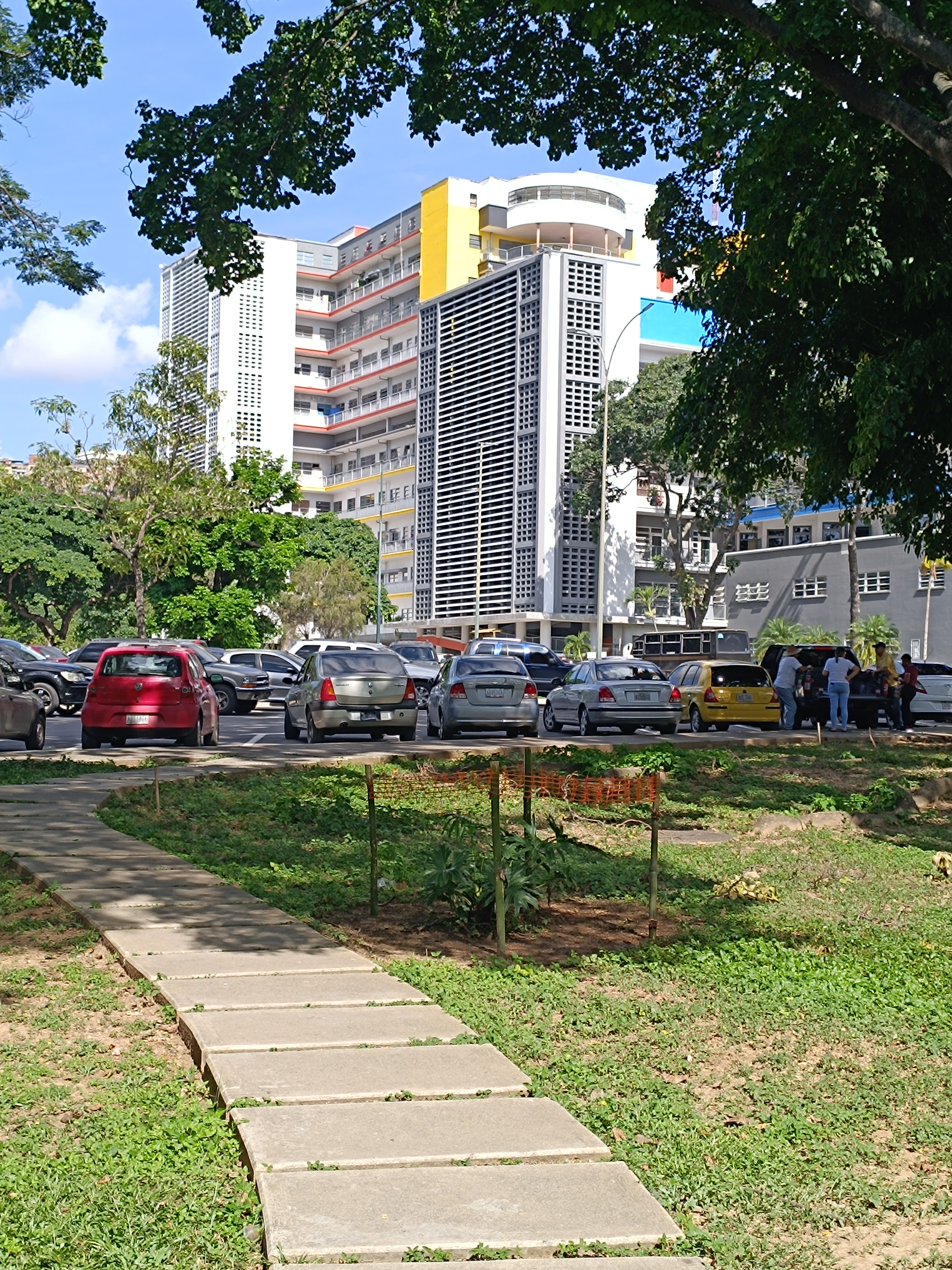
University Hospital, Central University of Venezuela

Venezuela has a national universal health care system. The current government has created a program to expand access to health care known as Misión Barrio Adentro, although its efficiency and work conditions have been criticized. As of December 2014 an estimated 80% of Barrio Adentro establishments are abandoned.

Infant mortality was 19 deaths per 1,000 births for 2014, which was lower than the South American average. To compare: The U.S. figure was 6 deaths per 1,000 births in 2013. In 2006, child malnutrition was 17%. Delta Amacuro and Amazonas had the nation's highest rates. In 2018, 32% of Venezuelans lacked adequate sanitation, primarily those living in rural areas. In 2006, diseases ranging from diphtheria, plague, malaria, typhoid fever, yellow fever, cholera, hepatitis A, hepatitis B, and hepatitis D were present in the country. In 2021, obesity was prevalent in approximately 30% of the adult population.

In 2004, Venezuela had 150 sewage treatment plants. 13% of the population lacked access to drinking water, but this number had been dropping. During the economic crisis under Maduro's presidency, medical professionals were forced to perform outdated treatments on patients, and electricity blackouts also affect care.

=== Education ===
Venezuela's illiteracy rate, based on data from UNESCO and the Instituto Nacional de Estadística (INE) of Venezuela

In 2008, 95.2% of the adult population was literate. The net primary school enrollment rate was at 91% and the net secondary school enrollment rate was at 63% in 2005. Universities include the Central University of Venezuela founded in 1721, the University of Zulia, the University of the Andes, Simón Bolívar University, and the University of the East.

Many graduates seek a future abroad because of the country's troubled economy and heavy crime rate. Over 1.35 million college graduates have left the country since the beginning of the Bolivarian Revolution. It is believed that nearly 12% of Venezuelans live abroad, with Ireland becoming a popular destination for students. According to Claudio Bifano, president of the Venezuelan Academy of Physical, Mathematical, and Natural Sciences, more than half of all medical graduates had left Venezuela in 2013.

By 2018, 58% of students had dropped out of school nationwide. Areas near bordering countries had more than 80% of their students leave. Nationwide, about 93% of schools do not meet the minimum requirements to operate and 77% do not have utilities such as food, water or electricity.

== Culture ==
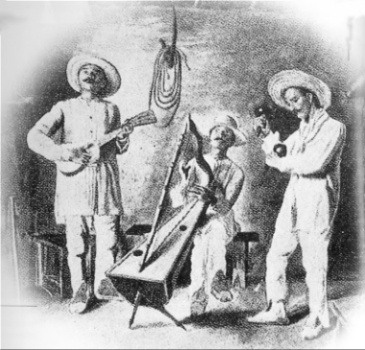
Música Llanera is the most popular folk genre, and the cowboy music, of Venezuela. Depiction of a Llanera band in 1912.

The culture of Venezuela is a melting pot made up of three main groups: the Indigenous Venezuelans, the Spanish, and the Africans. The Spanish influence predominates due to the colonization process and the socioeconomic structure it created. Spanish influences can be seen in the country's architecture, music, religion, and language. The Africans brought in many musical influences, especially introduction of the drum.

=== Architecture ===
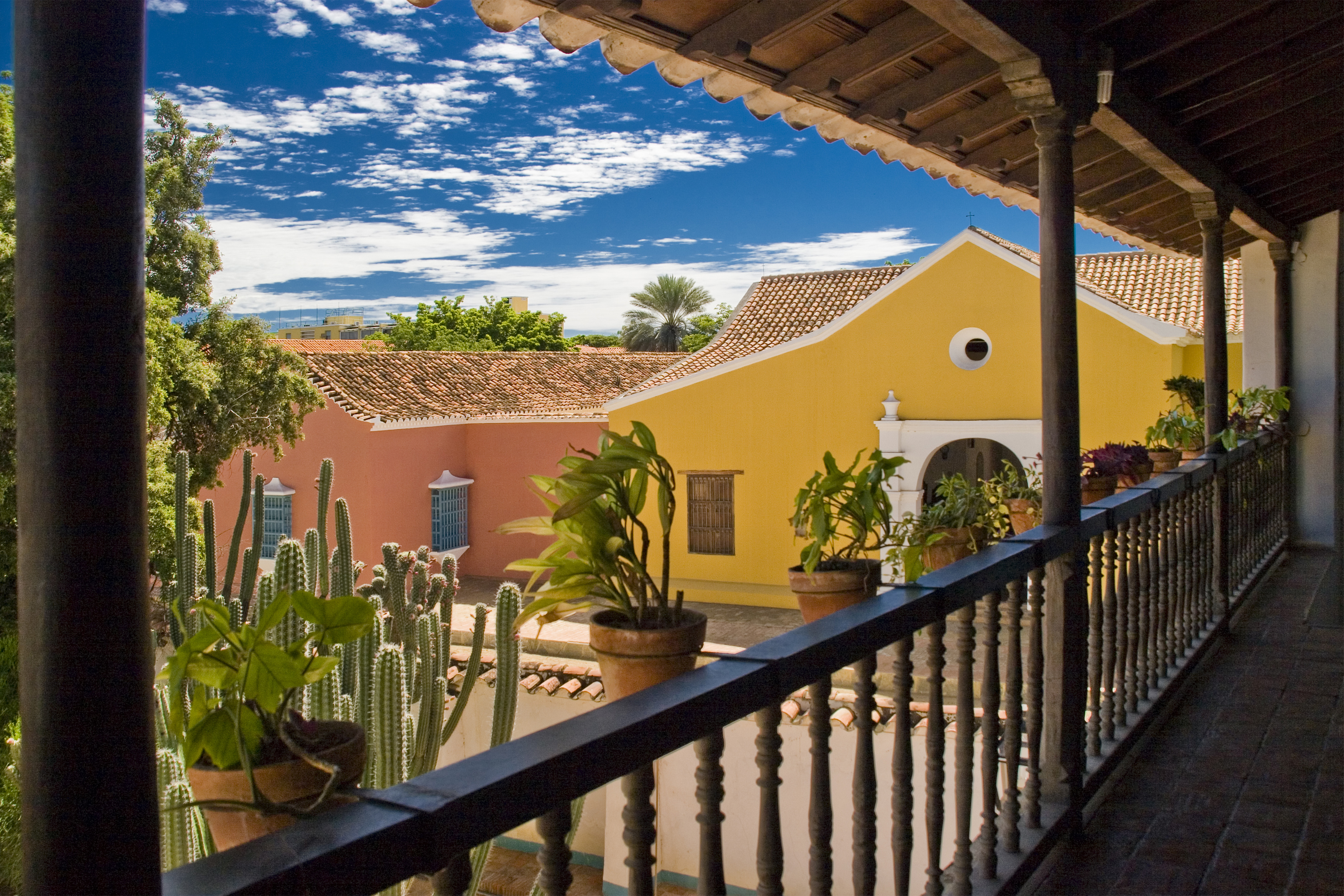
The historic center of Coro, a UNESCO World Heritage Site, is an example of Spanish colonial architecture in Venezuela.

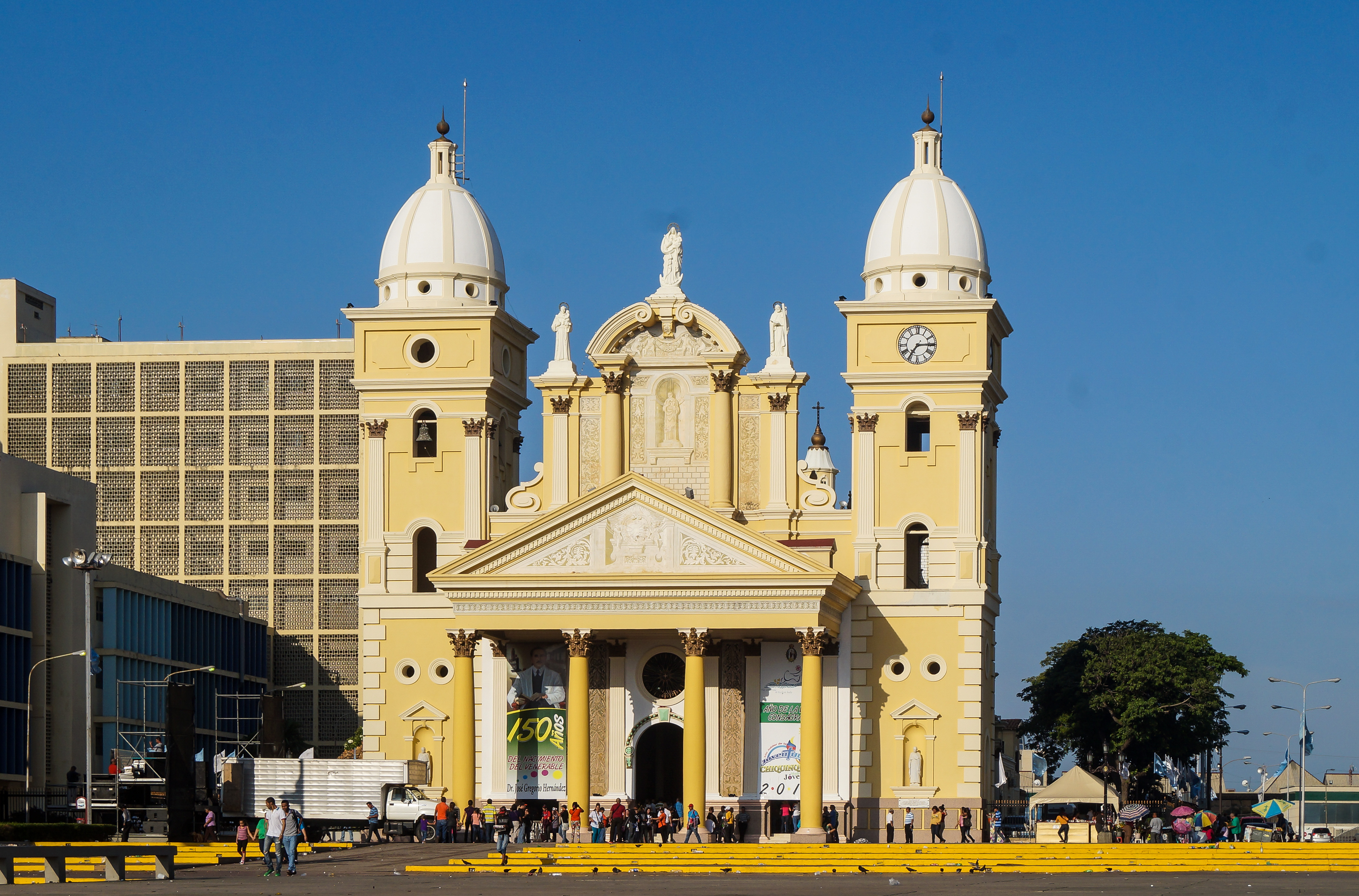
Basilica of Our Lady of Chiquinquirá, built between 1686 and completed in 1858, where is kept the colonial image of the Virgin of Chiquinquirá, in Maracaibo

Carlos Raúl Villanueva was the most important architect of the modern era; he designed the Central University of Venezuela, (a World Heritage Site) and its Aula Magna. Other notable architectural works include the Capitolio, the Baralt Theatre, the Teresa Carreño Cultural Complex, and the General Rafael Urdaneta Bridge.

Prehistoric man began to build useful architecture from approximately 1000 BC to the 15th century AD, in the period known as the "Neo-Indian". Neo-Indian architecture consisted of incipient constructions, such as agricultural terraces and vaults lined by stones, called mintoyes, which were used as tombs and silos for the storage of agricultural products. The Indo-Hispanic architecture developed from 1498 onward. Colonial architecture is built from the 16th century, when Venezuela began to be a dependent colony of the Spanish Empire, until 1810, when the process of independence began. The architecture of this period is characterized by its discreet modesty, with the exception of some cities. The renunciation of most of the decorative elements and variegated ostentations of fanciful baroque, the impossibility of using expensive materials and the consequent lack of craftsmen, contributed to establish a modest but well-defined physiognomy of the colonial architecture.

Christian temples from the colonial era were constituted by an almost invariable arrangement consisting of a rectangular plan, three naves separated by arches of alfarje roofing composed of religious architecture in colonial times. The society dedicated a great amount of resources to erect religious monuments comparable to those of other countries of the continent. The 17th century was of reconstruction of the Catholic churches that had been destroyed by the earthquake of 1641. In the 18th century, specifically between 1728 and 1785, the prosperity that Venezuela enjoyed due to the opening of the Compañía Guipuzcoana de Caracas was also reflected in the construction of new architecture, especially of a religious nature.

=== Art ===
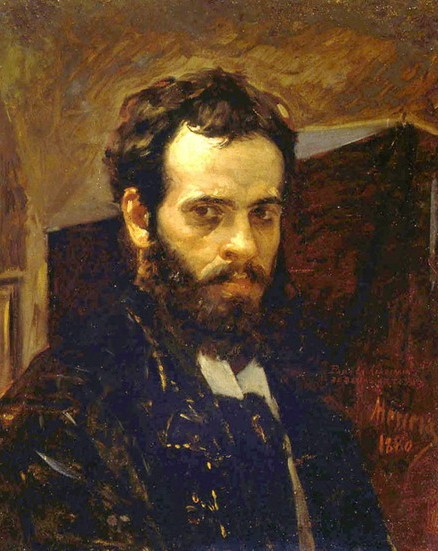
Antonio Herrera Toro, self portrait 1880

Venezuelan art was initially dominated by religious motifs. However, in the late 19th century, artists began emphasizing historical and heroic representations of the country's struggle for independence. This move was led by Martín Tovar y Tovar. Modernism took over in the 20th century. Notable Venezuelan artists include Arturo Michelena, Cristóbal Rojas, Armando Reverón, Manuel Cabré; the kinetic artists Jesús Soto, Gego and Carlos Cruz-Diez; and contemporary artists such as Marisol and Yucef Merhi.

=== Literature ===
Venezuelan literature originated soon after the Spanish conquest of the mostly pre-literate Indigenous societies. It was originally dominated by Spanish influences. Following the rise of political literature during the war of independence, Venezuelan Romanticism, notably expounded by Juan Vicente González, emerged as the first important genre in the region. Although mainly focused on narrative writing, Venezuelan literature was advanced by poets such as Andrés Eloy Blanco and Fermín Toro.

Major writers and novelists include Rómulo Gallegos, Teresa de la Parra, Arturo Uslar Pietri, Adriano González León, Miguel Otero Silva, and Mariano Picón Salas. The great poet and humanist Andrés Bello was also an educator and intellectual (He was also a childhood tutor and mentor of Simón Bolívar). Others, such as Laureano Vallenilla Lanz and José Gil Fortoul, contributed to Venezuelan Positivism.

=== Music ===
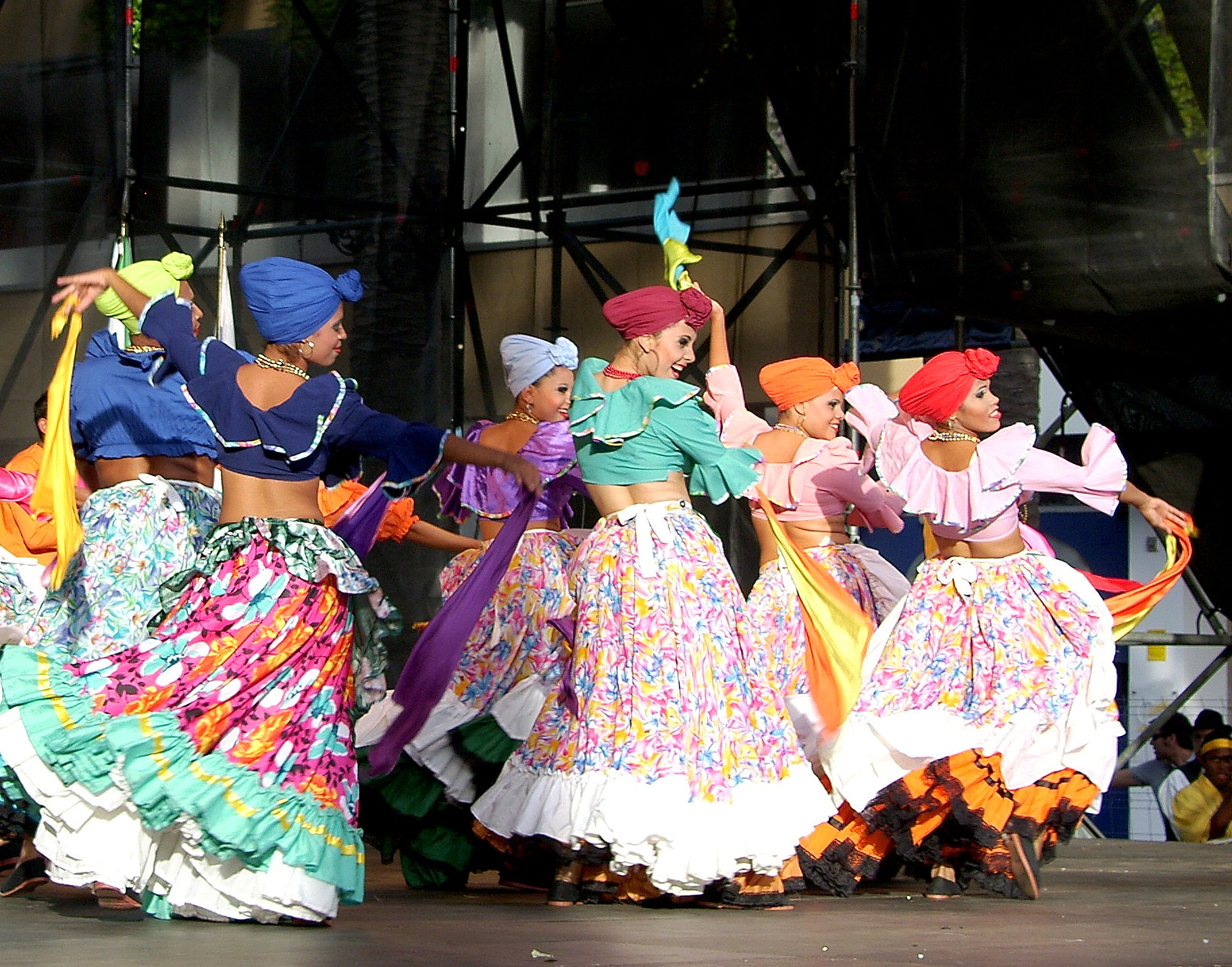
The Guanaguanare dance, a popular dance in Portuguesa State

The Indigenous musical styles are exemplified by groups like Un Solo Pueblo and Serenata Guayanesa. The national musical instrument is the cuatro. Traditional musical styles and songs mainly emerged in and around the llanos region, including "Alma llanera" (by Pedro Elías Gutiérrez and Rafael Bolívar Coronado), "Florentino y el diablo" (by Alberto Arvelo Torrealba), "Concierto en la llanura" by Juan Vicente Torrealba, and "Caballo viejo" (by Simón Díaz).

Zulian gaita is popular, generally performed during Christmas. The national dance is the joropo. Venezuela has always been a melting pot of cultures and this can be seen in the richness and variety of its musical styles and dances: calipso, bambuco, fulía, cantos de pilado de maíz, cantos de lavanderas, sebucán, and maremare. Teresa Carreño was a world-famous 19th-century piano virtuoso. Recently, great classical music performances have come out of Venezuela. The Simón Bolívar Youth Orchestra has hosted a number of excellent concerts in many European concert halls, most notably at the 2007 London Proms, and has received several honors. The orchestra is the pinnacle of El Sistema, a publicly financed, voluntary music education program now being emulated in other countries.

In the early 21st century, a movement known as "Movida Acústica Urbana" featured musicians trying to save some national traditions, creating their own original songs but using traditional instruments. Some groups following this movement are Tambor Urbano, Los Sinverguenzas, C4Trío, and Orozco Jam.

Afro-Venezuelan musical traditions are most intimately related to the festivals of the "black folk saints" San Juan and St. Benedict the Moor. Specific songs are related to the different stages of their festivals and processions, when the saints start their yearly "paseo" – stroll – through the community.

=== Sport ===
==== Baseball ====
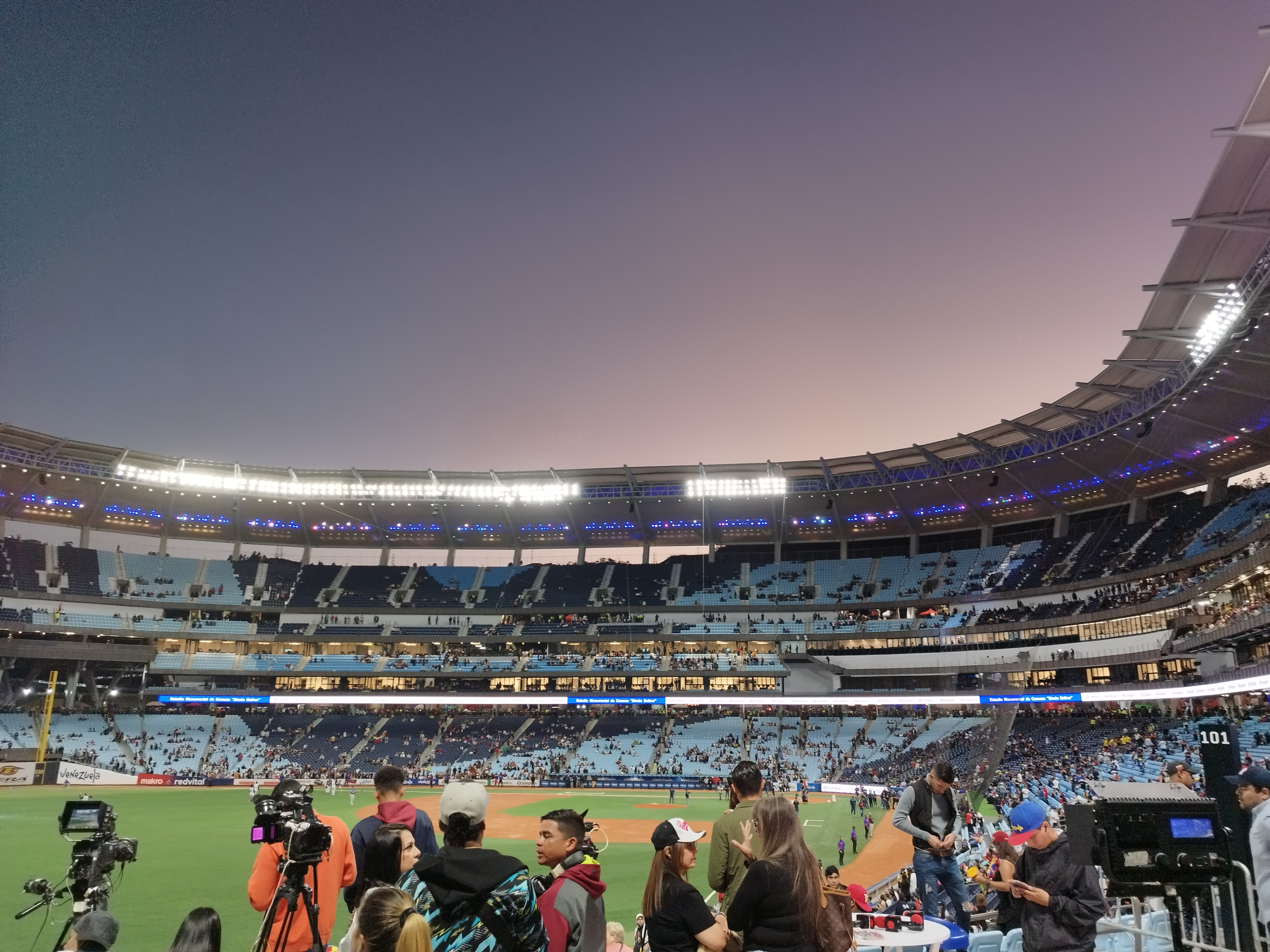
Monumental Stadium of Caracas Simón Bolívar is used by the Venezuelan Professional Baseball League and has a capacity of approximately 40,000 spectators.

The origins of baseball in Venezuela are unclear, although it is known that the sport was being played in the country by the late 19th century. In the early 20th century, North American immigrants who came to Venezuela to work in the nation's oil industry helped to popularize the sport. During the 1930s, baseball's popularity continued to rise, leading to the foundation of the Venezuelan Professional Baseball League in 1945, and the sport became the nation's most popular.

Venezuela competed in the 2026 World Baseball Classic for the tenth time. On 14 March 2026, after securing a vital victory against Japan in the quarterfinals, Venezuela qualified for the historically first time in the six-team baseball tournament for 2032. They then defeated Italy to qualify for the inaugural final. Venezuela beat the United States in the championship game by a final score of 3–2.

The popularity of baseball in the country makes Venezuela a rarity among its South American neighbors—association football is the dominant sport in the continent. However, being one of the Latin American baseball powerhouses, Venezuela remarkably has not competed in the Olympics tournament which began from 1992 Summer Olympics in Barcelona, unlike more famous teams such as Dominican Republic and Puerto Rico.

==== Football ====
Although not as popular in Venezuela as the rest of South America, football, spearheaded by the Venezuela national football team is gaining popularity as well. The sport is also noted for having an increased focus during the World Cup. Venezuela is scheduled to host the Copa América every 40 years.

==== Others ====
Basketball is behind baseball and football are among the more popular sports. Venezuela hosted the 2012 Basketball World Olympic Qualifying Tournament and the 2013 FIBA Basketball Americas Championship, which took place in the Poliedro de Caracas.

Venezuela is home to former Formula 1 driver, Pastor Maldonado. Maldonado has increased the reception of Formula 1 in Venezuela, helping to popularize the sport in the country.

Rubén Limardo won a gold medal in fencing. In the Winter Sports, Cesar Baena had represented the country since 2008 in Nordic Skiing, the first South American skier to compete in a FIS Cross Country Ski World Cup on Düsseldorf 2009.

== See also ==
- Outline of Venezuela

== Bibliography ==
=== Articles ===
- Cannon, Barry (21 June 2004). "Venezuela, April 2002: Coup or Popular Rebellion? The Myth of a United Venezuela". Bulletin of Latin American Research. 23 (3): 285–302. doi:10.1111/j.0261-3050.2004.00109.x. S2CID 56445250.

=== Books ===
- Aalgaard, Wendy (2004). Venezuela in Pictures. Lerner Pub Group. ISBN 978-0-8225-1172-4.
- Aponte, Pedro Rafael (2008). The Invention of the National in Venezuelan Art Music, 1920–1960. University of Pittsburgh. ISBN 978-1-109-05320-3. Archived from the original on 6 January 2017.
- Carroll, Rory. Comandante: Hugo Chávez's Venezuela (Penguin Books, 2014).
- Chasteen, John Charles (2001). Born in Blood and Fire: A Concise History of Latin America. Norton. ISBN 978-0-393-05048-6.
- Chávez, Hugo (2004). Cumpliendo las metas del milenio (PDF) (in Spanish). CDBpublicaciones. ISBN 978-980-6456-12-9. Archived from the original (PDF) on 11 May 2011.
- Coronil, Fernando (1988). The magical state: nature, money, and modernity in Venezuela. University of Chicago Press. ISBN 978-0-226-11602-0.
- Cortés, Carlos E. (2013). Multicultural America: A Multimedia Encyclopedia. SAGE Publications. ISBN 978-1-4522-1683-6.
- Crow, JA (1980). Epic of Latin America. University of California Press. ISBN 978-0-520-04107-3.
- Dickey, John Marcus (1892). Christopher Columbus and his monument Columbia: being a concordance of choice tributes to the great Genoese, his grand discovery, and his greatness of mind and purpose. Rand, McNally & Co. ISBN 978-1-4460-2044-9.
- Dydynski, Krzysztof; Beech, Charlotte (2004). Venezuela. Lonely Planet Publications. ISBN 978-1-74104-197-2.
- Ewell, Judith (1984). Venezuela: A Century of Change. C. Hurst & Co. ISBN 978-0-905838-36-6.
- Fichner-Ratus, Lois (2012). Understanding Art (10th ed.). Cengage Learning. ISBN 978-1-111-83695-5.
- Georgia Country Study Guide Volume 1 Strategic Information and Developments. Int'l Business Publications, USA. 2013. ISBN 978-1-4387-7443-5.
- Gibson, Karen Bush (2006). Venezuela: A Question and Answer Book. Capstone. ISBN 978-0-7368-6413-8.
- Gott, Richard (2005). Hugo Chávez and the Bolivarian Revolution. Verso. ISBN 978-1-84467-533-3.
- Gregory, Desmond (1992). Brute New World: The Rediscovery of Latin America in the Early 19th Century. British American Press. ISBN 978-1-85043-567-9.
- Heritage, Andrew (December 2002). Financial Times World Desk Reference. Dorling Kindersley. ISBN 978-0-7894-8805-3.
- Jozsa, Frank P. Jr. (2013). Baseball beyond Borders: From Distant Lands to the Major Leagues. Scarecrow Press. ISBN 978-0-8108-9245-3.
- Kelly, Janet; Palma, Perdo A. (2006). "Chapter 10: The Syndrome of Economic Decline and the Quest for Change". In McCoy, Jennifer L.; Myers, David J. (eds.). The Unraveling of Representative Democracy in Venezuela. Johns Hopkins University Press. ISBN 978-0-8018-8428-3.
- Kipfer, Barbara Ann (2000). Encyclopedic Dictionary of Archaeology. Springer. ISBN 978-0-306-46158-3.
- López Maya, Margarita (2005). "Venezuela 2002–2003: Polarisation, Confrontation, and Violence". In Goumbri, Olivia Burlingame (ed.). The Venezuela Reader: The Building of a People's Democracy. Washington, D.C.: Epica Task Force. ISBN 978-0-918346-35-3.
- Márquez, Laureano; Eduardo, Sanabria (2018). "La democracia pierde energía". Historieta de Venezuela: De Macuro a Maduro (1st ed.). Gráficas Pedrazas. ISBN 978-1-7328777-1-9.
- Massabié, Germán (2008). Venezuela: A Petro-State Using Renewable Energies. Springer. ISBN 978-3-531-15994-2.
- McBeth, B. S. (2002). Juan Vicente Gómez and the Oil Companies in Venezuela, 1908–1935. Cambridge University Press. ISBN 978-0-521-89218-6.
- Ng, Yumi (2004). Welcome to Venezuela. Gareth Stevens Publishing. ISBN 978-0-8368-3123-8.
- Nichols, Elizabeth Gackstetter; Morse, Kimberley J. (2010). Venezuela. ABC-CLIO. ISBN 978-1-59884-569-3.
- Salas, Miguel Tinker (2 August 2004). "Culture, Power, and Oil: The Experience of Venezuelan Oil Camps and the Construction of Citizenship". In Gilbert G. Gonzalez; Raul A. Fernandez; Vivian Price; David Smith; Linda Trinh Võ (eds.). Labor Versus Empire: Race, Gender, Migration. Routledge. ISBN 978-1-135-93528-3.
- Salas, Miguel Tinker (2015). Venezuela: What Everyone Needs to KnowRG. Oxford University Press. ISBN 978-0-19-978328-1.
- Schincariol, Vitor Eduardo. Society and Economy in Venezuela: An Overview of the Bolivarian Period (1998-2018). (2020).
- Stoan, Stephen K. (1974). Pablo Morillo and Venezuela, 1815–1820. Ohio State University Press. ISBN 978-0-8142-0219-7.
- Straka, Tomás, Guillermo Guzmán Mirabal, and Alejandro E. Cáceres. Historical Dictionary of Venezuela (Rowman & Littlefield, 2017).
- Tarver, H. Michael; Frederick, Julia C. (2006). The History of Venezuela. Palgrave Macmillan. ISBN 978-1-4039-6260-7.
- Thomas, Hugh (2005). Rivers of Gold: The Rise of the Spanish Empire, from Columbus to Magellan. Random House. ISBN 978-0-375-50204-0.
- Wardrope, William (2003). Venezuela. Gareth Stevens Publishing. ISBN 978-0-8368-2369-1.
- Wilpert, Gregory. Changing Venezuela by taking power: the history and policies of the Chavez government (2007) online
- Warhol, Tom (2006). Tundra. Marshall Cavendish. ISBN 978-0-7614-2193-1.
- Wunder, Sven (2003). Oil wealth and the fate of the forest: a comparative study of eight tropical countries. Routledge. ISBN 978-0-203-98667-7.
- Yergin, Daniel (1991). The Prize: The Epic Quest for Oil, Money, and Power. Simon and Schuster. ISBN 978-1-4391-1012-6.
- Zakaria, Fareed (1999). From Wealth to Power. Princeton University Press. ISBN 978-0-691-01035-9.
- Zamora, Margarita (1993). Reading Columbus. University of California Press. ISBN 978-0-520-08297-7. Archived from the original on 11 May 2011.

=== Talks and interviews ===
- Lander, Edgardo (April 2014). "The Modern History of Venezuela (9 parts)". Archived from the original on 10 October 2017.
