= Colonial Venezuela =

Colonization in Venezuela

Spanish expeditions led by Columbus and Alonso de Ojeda reached the coast of present-day Venezuela in 1498 and 1499. The first colonial exploitation was of the pearl oysters of the "Pearl Islands". Spain established its first permanent South American settlement in the present-day city of Cumaná in 1502, and in 1577 Caracas became the capital of the Province of Venezuela. There was also for a few years a German colony at Klein-Venedig.

The 16th- and 17th-century colonial economy was centered on gold mining and livestock farming. The relatively small number of colonists employed indigenous farmers on their haciendas, and enslaved other indigenous people and, later, Africans to work in the mines. The Venezuelan territories were governed at different times from the distant capitals of the Viceroyalties of New Spain and Peru.

In the 18th century, cocoa plantations grew up along the coast, worked by further importations of African slaves. Cacao beans became Venezuela's principal export, monopolized by the Compañía Guipuzcoana de Caracas. Most of the surviving indigenous people had by then migrated to the south, where Spanish friars were active. Intellectual activity increased among the white Creole elite, centered on the university at Caracas. The Province of Venezuela was included in the Viceroyalty of New Granada in 1717, and became the Captaincy General of Venezuela in 1777.

The independence struggle began in 1810 while Spain was engaged in the Peninsular War. The Venezuelan War of Independence ensued. The Republic of Gran Colombia became independent from Spain in 1821 under the leadership of Simón Bolívar, and Venezuela separated from that Republic in 1830.

== Exploration ==
Christopher Columbus sailed along the eastern coast of Venezuela on his third voyage in 1498, the only one of his four voyages to reach the South American mainland. This expedition discovered the so-called "Pearl Islands" of Cubagua and Margarita off the northeastern coast of Venezuela. Later Spanish expeditions returned to exploit these islands' once abundant pearl oysters, enslaving the indigenous people of the islands and harvesting the pearls so intensively that they became one of the most valuable resources of the incipient Spanish Empire in the Americas between 1508 and 1531, by which time both the local indigenous population and the pearl oysters had become devastated.

The Spanish expedition led by Alonso de Ojeda, sailing along the length of the northern coast of South America in 1499, gave the name Venezuela ("little Venice" in Spanish) to the Gulf of Venezuela — because of its imagined similarity to the Italian city.

== Early colonization ==
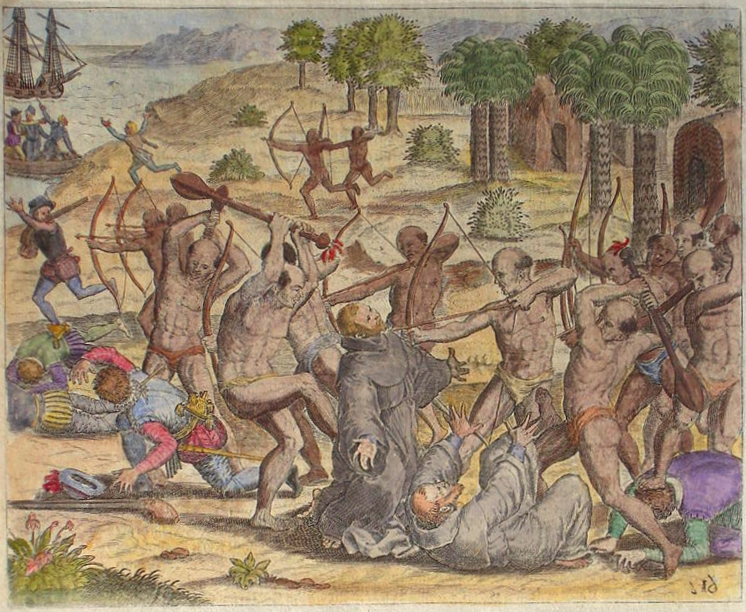
The Natives of Cumaná attack the mission after Gonzalo de Ocampo's slaving raid. Colored copperplate by Theodor de Bry, published in the "Relación brevissima de las indias".

Spain's colonization of mainland Venezuela started in 1502 when it established its first permanent South American settlement in the present-day city of Cumaná (then called Nueva Toledo), which was founded officially in 1515 by Franciscan friars.

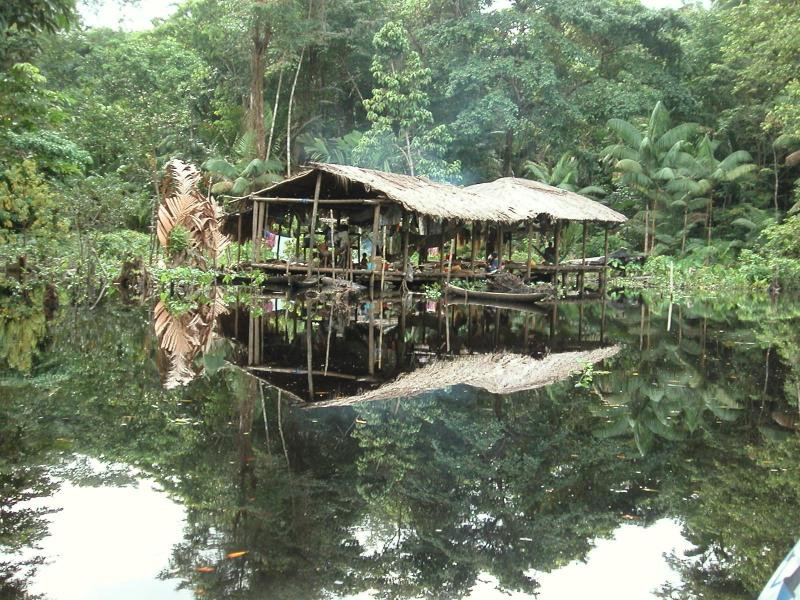
A palafito like the ones seen by Amerigo Vespucci

At the time of the Spanish arrival (Pre-Columbian period in Venezuela), indigenous people lived mainly in groups as agriculturists and hunters: along the coast, in the Andean mountain range, and along the Orinoco River.

In 1527 Santa Ana de Coro was founded by Juan de Ampíes, the first governor of the Spanish Empire's Venezuela Province. Coro would be the Province's capital until 1546 followed by El Tocuyo (1546 - 1577), until the capital was moved to Caracas in 1577 by Juan de Pimentel.

Klein-Venedig (Little Venice) was the most significant part of the German colonization of the Americas, from 1528 to 1546, in which the Augsburg-based Welser banking family obtained colonial rights in Venezuela Province in return for debts owed by Charles I of Spain. The primary motivation was the search for the legendary golden city of El Dorado. The venture was initially led by Ambrosius Ehinger, who founded Maracaibo in 1529. After the deaths of first Ehinger (1533) and then his successor Nikolaus Federmann, Georg von Speyer (1540), Philipp von Hutten continued exploration in the interior, and in his absence from the capital of the province the crown of Spain claimed the right to appoint the governor. On Hutten's return to the capital, Santa Ana de Coro, in 1546, the Spanish governor Juan de Carvajal had Hutten and Bartholomeus Welser executed. Subsequently, Charles I revoked Welser's charter.

By the middle of the 16th century, not many more than 2,000 Europeans lived in present-day Venezuela. The opening of gold mines at Yaracuy led to the introduction of slavery, at first involving the indigenous population, then imported Africans. The first real economic success of the colony involved the raising of livestock, much helped by the grassy plains known as Llanos. The society that developed as a result – a handful of Spanish landowners and widely dispersed Indian herdsmen on Spanish-introduced horses – recalls primitive feudalism, certainly a powerful concept in the 16th-century Spanish imagination, and (perhaps more fruitfully) bears comparison in economic terms with the latifundia of antiquity.

During the 16th and 17th centuries the cities which constitute today's Venezuela suffered relative neglect. The Viceroyalties of New Spain and Peru (located on the sites formerly occupied by the capital cities of the Aztecs and Incas respectively) showed more interest in their nearby gold- and silver-mines than in the remote agricultural societies of Venezuela. Responsibility for the Venezuelan territories shifted to and fro between the two Viceroyalties.

== New Granada and Captaincy General (1717 - 1812) ==
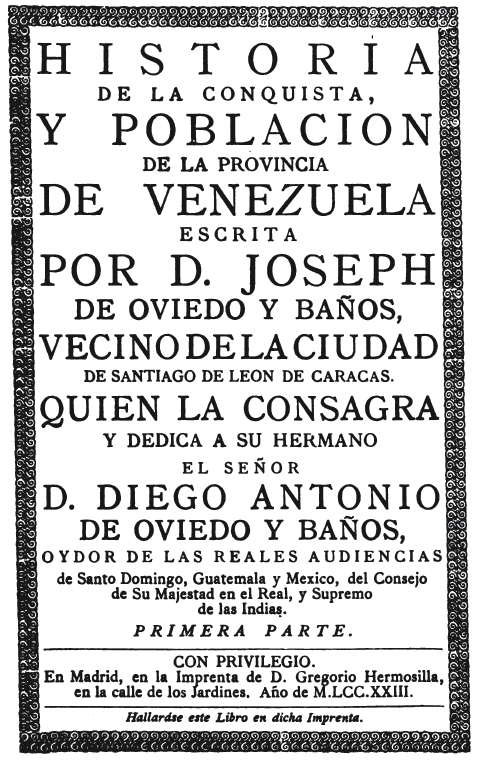
Historia de la conquista y población de la Provincia de Venezuela (1723), by José de Oviedo y Baños

The Province of Venezuela came under the jurisdiction of the Viceroyalty of New Granada (established in 1717). The Province became the Captaincy General of Venezuela on 8 September 1777 through the Royal Decree of Graces of 1777 issued by Spain.

In the 18th century a second Venezuelan society formed along the coast with the establishment of cocoa plantations manned by much larger importations of African slaves. Quite a number of black slaves also worked in the haciendas of the grassy llanos. Most of the Amerindians who still survived had perforce migrated to the plains and jungles to the south, where only Spanish friars took an interest in them — especially the Franciscans or Capucins, who compiled grammars and small lexicons for some of their languages. The most important friar misión (the name for an area of friar activity) developed in San Tomé in the Guayana Region.

The Compañía Guipuzcoana de Caracas held a close monopoly on trade with Europe. The Guipuzcoana company stimulated the Venezuelan economy, especially in fostering the cultivation of cacao beans, which became Venezuela's principal export. It opened Venezuelan ports to foreign commerce, but this recognized a fait accompli. Like no other Spanish American dependency, Venezuela had more contacts with Europe through the British and French islands in the Caribbean. In an almost surreptitious, though legal, manner, Caracas itself had become an intellectual powerhouse. From 1721 it had its own university (Central University of Venezuela), which taught Latin, medicine and engineering, apart (of course) from the humanities. Its most illustrious graduate, Andrés Bello (1781–1865), became the greatest Spanish American polymath of his time. In Chacao, a town to the east of Caracas, there flourished a school of music whose director José Ángel Lamas (1775–1814) produced a few but impressive compositions according with the strictest 18th-century European canons.

== Independence ==
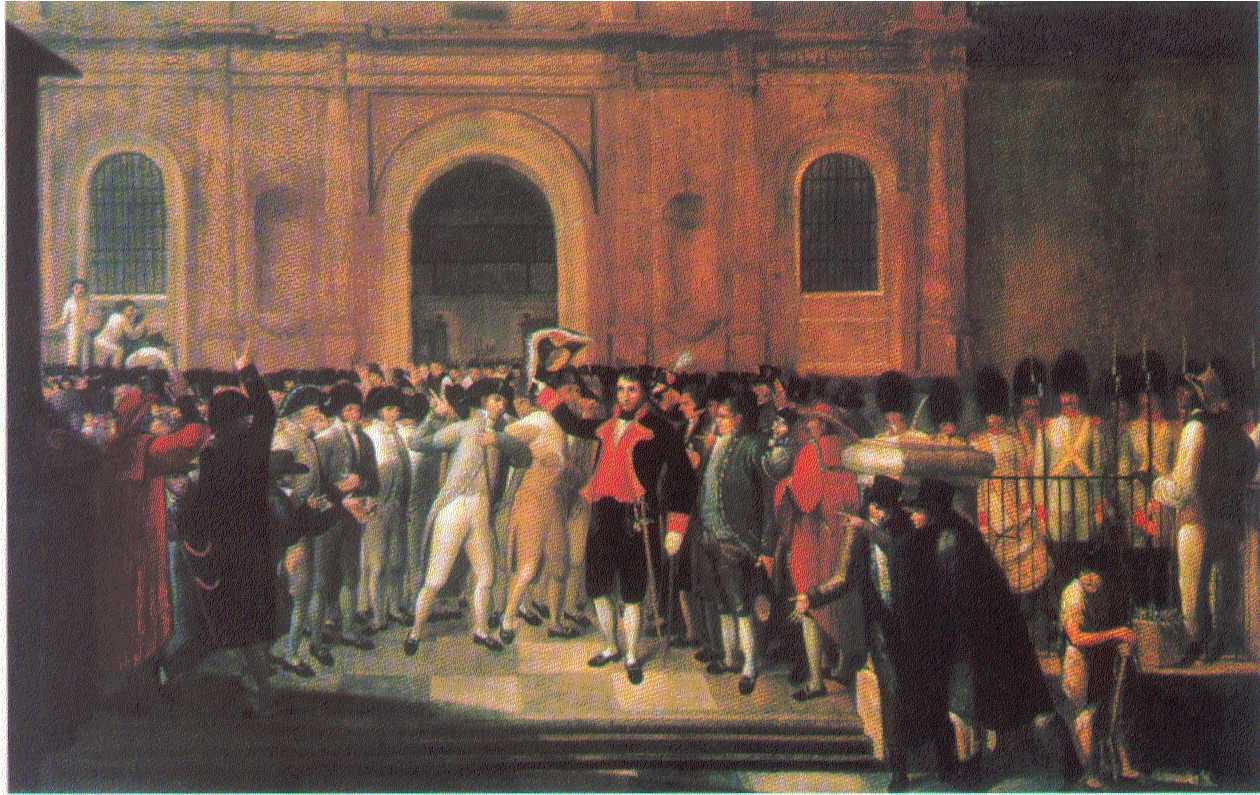
The 19th of April, 1810. Painting by Juan Lovera (1835)

Some Venezuelans began to grow resistant to colonial control towards the end of the eighteenth century. Spain's neglect of its Venezuelan colony contributed to Venezuelan intellectuals' increased zeal for learning. The colony had more external sources of information than other more "important" Spanish dependencies, not excluding the viceroyalties, although one should not belabor this point, for only the mantuanos (a Venezuelan name for the white Creole elite) had access to a solid education. (Another name for the mantuanos class, grandes cacaos, reflected the source of their wealth. To this day in Venezuela the term can apply to a presumptuous person.) The mantuanos showed themselves presumptuous, overbearing and zealous in affirming their privileges against the pardo (mixed-race) majority of the population.

The first organized conspiracy against the colonial regime in Venezuela occurred in 1797, organized by Manuel Gual and José María España. It took direct inspiration from the French Revolution, but was put down with the collaboration of the "mantuanos" because it promoted radical social changes. The general Francisco de Miranda hero of French Revolution has long been associated with the struggle of the Spanish colonies in Latin America for independence. Miranda envisioned an independent empire consisting of all the territories that had been under Spanish and Portuguese rule, stretching from the Mississippi River to Cape Horn. This empire was to be under the leadership of a hereditary emperor called the "Inca", in honor of the great Inca Empire, and would have a bicameral legislature. He conceived the name Colombia for this empire, after the explorer Christopher Columbus.

With informal British help, general Miranda led an attempted invasion of the Captaincy General of Venezuela in 1804. At the time, Britain was at war with Spain, an ally of Napoleon. In November 1805, Miranda travelled to New York, where privately began organizing a filibustering expedition to liberate Venezuela. Miranda hired a ship of 20 guns, which he rebaptized Leander in honor of his oldest son, and set sail to Venezuela on 2 February 1806 but failed in an attempt of landing in Ocumare de la Costa.

Miranda spent the next year in the British Caribbean waiting for reinforcements that never came. On his return to Britain, he was met with better support for his plans from the British government. In 1808 a large military force to attack Venezuela was assembled and placed under the command of Arthur Wellesley, but Napoleon's invasion of Spain suddenly transformed Spain into an ally of Britain, and the force instead went there to fight in the Peninsular War.

European events sowed the seeds of Venezuela's declaration of independence. The Napoleonic Wars in Europe not only weakened Spain's imperial power, but also put Britain (unofficially) on the side of the independence movement. In May 1808, Napoleon demanded and received the abdication of Ferdinand VII of Spain and the confirmation of the abdication of Ferdinand's father Charles IV. Napoleon then appointed as King of Spain his own brother Joseph Bonaparte. That marked the beginning of Spain's own War of Independence from French hegemony and partial occupation, before the Spanish American wars of independence even began. The focal point of Spanish political resistance, the Supreme Central Junta, formed to govern in the name of Ferdinand. The first major defeat that Napoleonic France suffered occurred at the Battle of Bailén, in Andalusia (July 1808). (At this battle Pablo Morillo, future commander of the army that invaded New Granada and Venezuela; Emeterio Ureña, an anti-independence officer in Venezuela; and José de San Martín, the future Liberator of Argentina and Chile, fought side by side against the French General Pierre Dupont.) Despite this Spanish victory, the French soon regained the initiative and advanced into southern Spain. The Spanish government had to retreat to the island redoubt of Cádiz. Here the Supreme Central Junta dissolved itself and set up a five-person regency to handle the affairs of state until the full Cortes of Cádiz could convene.

Word of these events soon reached Caracas, but only on 19 April 1810 did its "cabildo" (city council) decide to follow the example set by the Spanish provinces two years earlier, declaring the First Republic of Venezuela. Other provincial capitals as Barcelona, Cumaná, Mérida, La Asuncion, Barinas and Trujillo, followed suit. Although the new Junta Suprema de Caracas had self-appointed élite members who claimed to represent the pardos (free blacks and even slaves), the new government eventually faced the challenge of maintaining the alliance with the pardos. Given recent history these groups still had grievances against the mantuanos. A segment of the mantuanos (among them a 27-year-old Simón Bolívar, the future Liberator) saw the setting up of the Junta as a step toward outright independence.

The Venezuelan War of Independence ensued. It ran concurrently with that of New Granada. On 17 December 1819 the Congress of Angostura declared Gran Colombia an independent country. After two more years of war, the country achieved independence from Spain in 1821 under the leadership of its most famous son, Simón Bolívar. Venezuela, along with the present-day countries of Colombia, Panama, and Ecuador, formed part of the Republic of Gran Colombia until 1830, when Venezuela separated and became a separate sovereign country.
