= Welser (surname) =

Welser is a surname. Notable people with the surname include:

- Bartholomeus V. Welser (c. 1475 – 1559), Augsburg merchant and banker
- Bartholomeus VI. Welser (1512–1546), explorer of Venezuela
- Carl Wilhelm Welser von Neunhof (1663–1711), mayor of Nuremberg
- Franz Welser-Möst (born 1960), Austrian conductor, music director of the Cleveland Orchestra
- Maria von Welser (born 1946), German journalist
- Mark Welser (1558–1614), German banker, politician, and astronomer
- Philippine Welser (1527–1580), morganatic wife of Ferdinand II, Archduke of Austria
- Welser family, a German banking and merchant family.
