= Bartholomeus Welser V =

German banker

Bartholomeus Welser the Elder
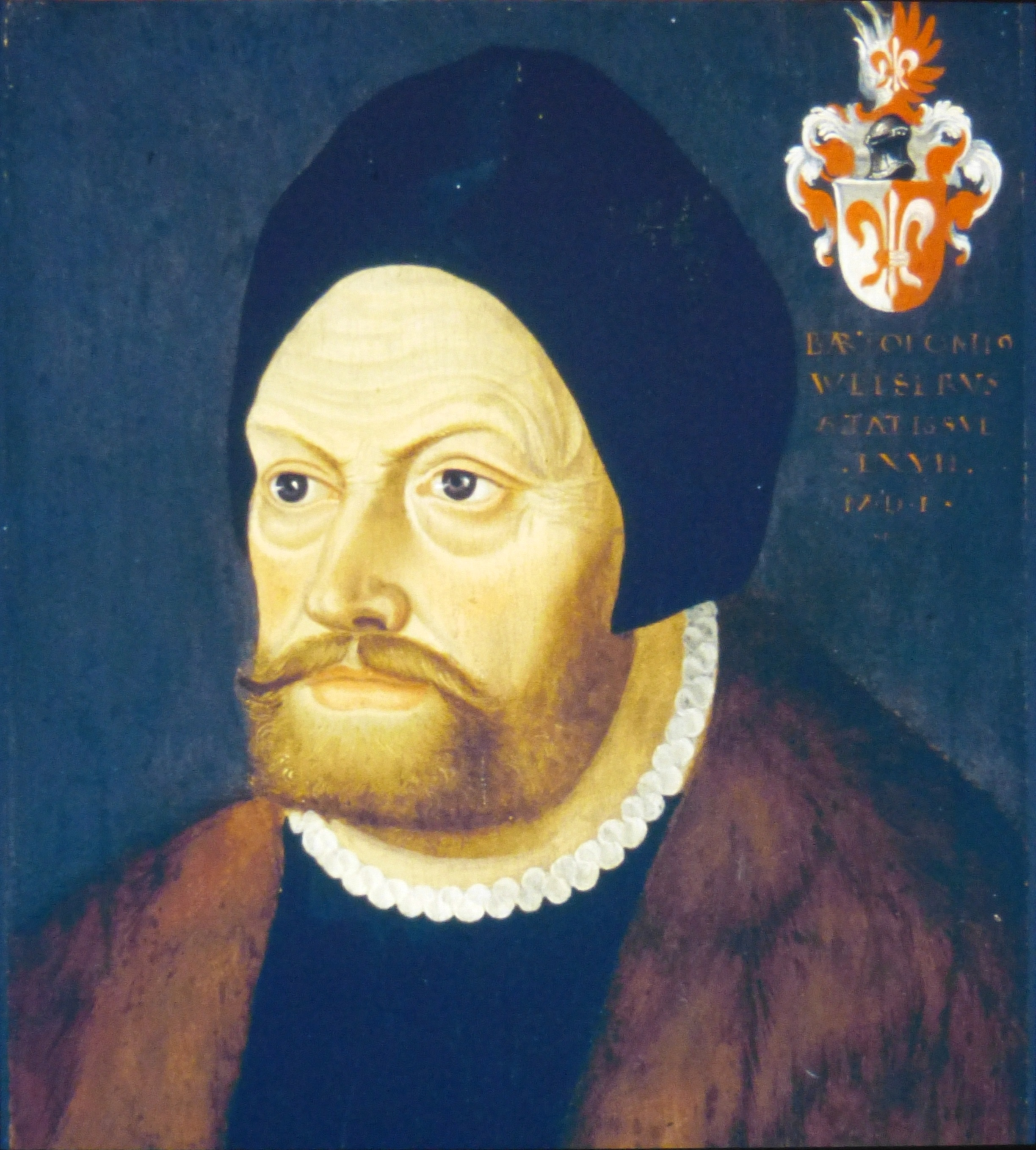
- Born: June 25, 1484; Memmingen, Holy Roman Empire
- Died: March 28, 1561 (Age 77); Amberg, Duchy of Bavaria

Prince Bartholomeus Welser (25 June 1484 in Memmingen – 28 March 1561 in Amberg) was a German banker. In 1528 he signed an agreement with Charles V, emperor of the Holy Roman Empire, granting a concession in Venezuela Province, which became Klein-Venedig until the concession was revoked in 1546.

== Biography ==
Welser was head of the German banking firm, Welser Brothers, and with his brother Antony claimed descent from the Byzantine general Belisarius. They were very rich, and lent large sums to Charles V, for which Bartholomeus was created a prince of the empire and made privy councillor to the emperor. In 1527, he was granted the newly discovered Province of Venezuela, with the proviso that he conquer the country at his own expense, enlist only Spanish and Flemish troops, fit out two expeditions of four vessels, and build two cities and three forts within two years after taking possession. As Venezuela was reputed to contain gold mines, he later obtained permission to send out 150 German miners.

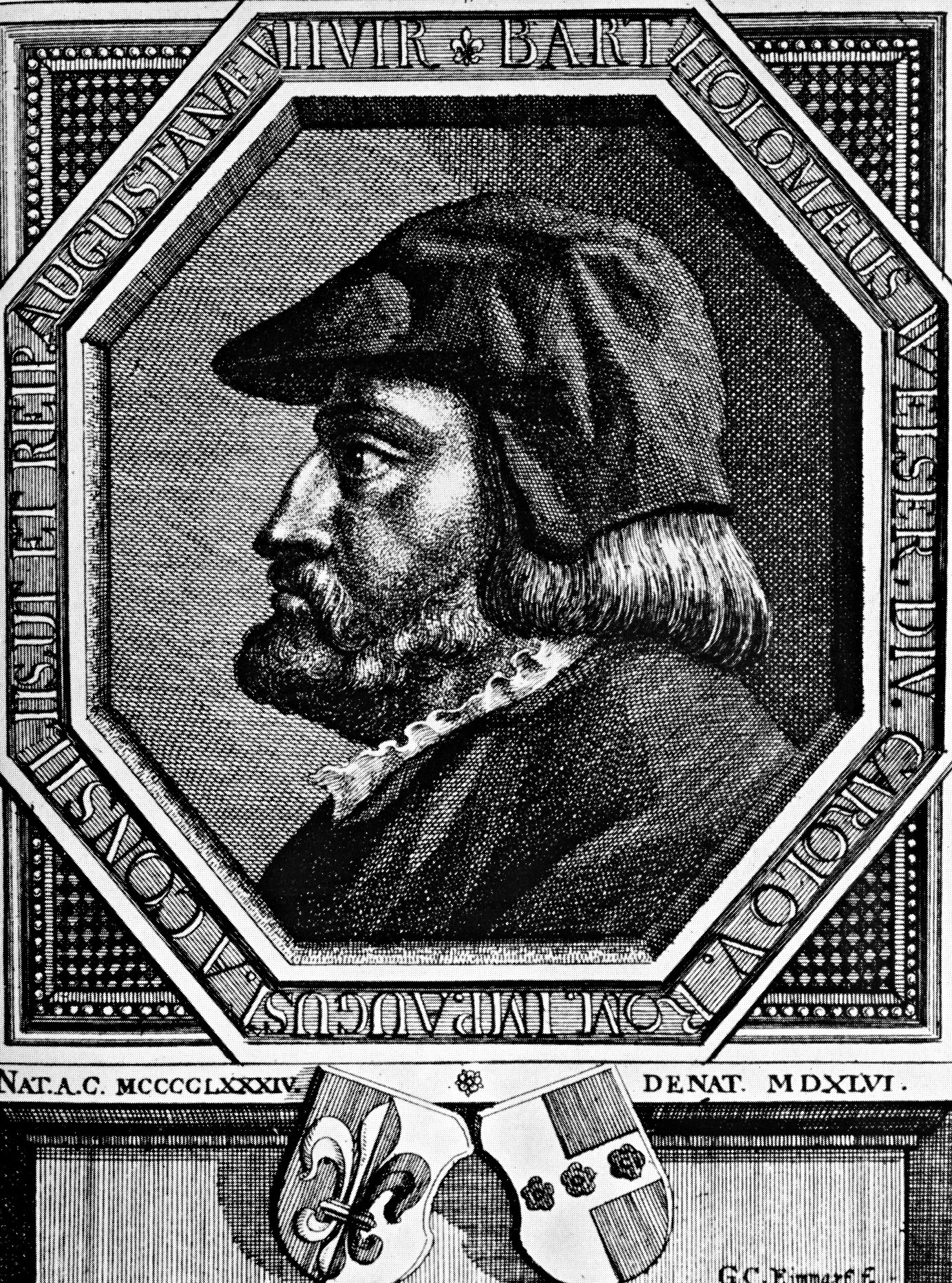
Bartholomeus Welser, engraving by Georg Christoph Eimmart

In virtue of his contract, Welser armed a fleet, which sailed from Sanlúcar de Barrameda early in 1528, under the command of Ambrosius Ehinger, whom he appointed captain general. After Ehinger's death in 1531, Georg von Speyer became captain general, and fitted out a new expedition, which sailed in 1534. In 1540 his son, Bartholomeus VI. Welser journeyed to Venezuela. Finding Speyer dead on his arrival he joined the expedition of Philipp von Hutten. After his return to El Tocuyo in April 1546 he and von Hutten were taken captive by the Spanish conquistador Juan de Carvajal, and later executed. After that the crown of Spain claimed the right to appoint the governor, and finally, in 1546, Charles V revoked Welser's charter.

Welser did much to establish trade between the Netherlands, Germany, and South America. His enterprise has been commended by many writers, and is eulogized by Henri Ternaux-Compans in his collection, but it was detrimental to the interests of the banker, whose losses in his colonization schemes were estimated to reach the sum of 3,000,000 florins.

In 1889, Welser's banking house still existed, as did the old family mansion, which is one of the curiosities of the city of Augsburg.

== See also ==
- Philipp von Hutten
