= German colonization of the Americas =

German attempts at the colonization of the Americas consisted of German Venezuela (German: Klein-Venedig, also German: Welser-Kolonie), St. Thomas and Crab Island in the 16th and 17th centuries.

== History ==
=== Klein-Venedig ===
In this map of German colonies, yellow marks Klein-Venedig and red the Prussian colonies, some of them in the Caribbean.

Klein-Venedig ("Little Venice"; also the etymology of the name "Venezuela") was the most significant part of the German colonization of the Americas between 1528 and 1546. The Augsburg-based Welser banking family (bankers to the Habsburgs) was given the colonial rights to the land by Emperor Charles V, who owed them debts for his imperial election as Holy Roman Emperor. In 1528, Charles V issued a charter by which the Welsers possessed the rights to explore, rule and colonize the area with the primary motivation of searching for the legendary golden city of El Dorado. The venture was initially led by Ambrosius Ehinger, who founded Maracaibo in 1529. After the deaths of first Ehinger (1533), Nikolaus Federmann, Georg von Speyer (1540), Philipp von Hutten continued exploration in the interior. In the absence of Hutten from the capital of the province, the crown of Spain claimed the right to appoint the governor. The Spanish Juan de Carvajal was nominated governor by the Emperor Charles V and tried to take control of the province. In 1545 he founded El Tocuyo with German colonists of Coro. On Hutten's return to the capital, Santa Ana de Coro, in 1546, governor Carvajal had Hutten and Bartholomeus VI. Welser executed over the duo's refusal to relinquish control of the colony. The act was deemed an illegal execution, and Spanish crown forces tried and executed Carvajal for the crime. Subsequently, Charles V revoked Welser's charter.

The Welsers transported German miners to the colony, as well as 4,000 African slaves as labour to work sugar cane plantations. Many of the German colonists died from tropical diseases, to which they had no immunity, or during frequent wars with Native Americans.

=== Brandenburg-Prussia ===
The Brandenburgisch-Africanische Compagnie of Brandenburg (the future Kingdom of Prussia) established trading posts in Africa and leased a trading post on St. Thomas from the Danish West India-Guinea Company in 1685. In 1693, the Danes seized the post, its warehouse, and all its goods without warning or repayment. There were no permanent German settlers.

German colonization of the Americas

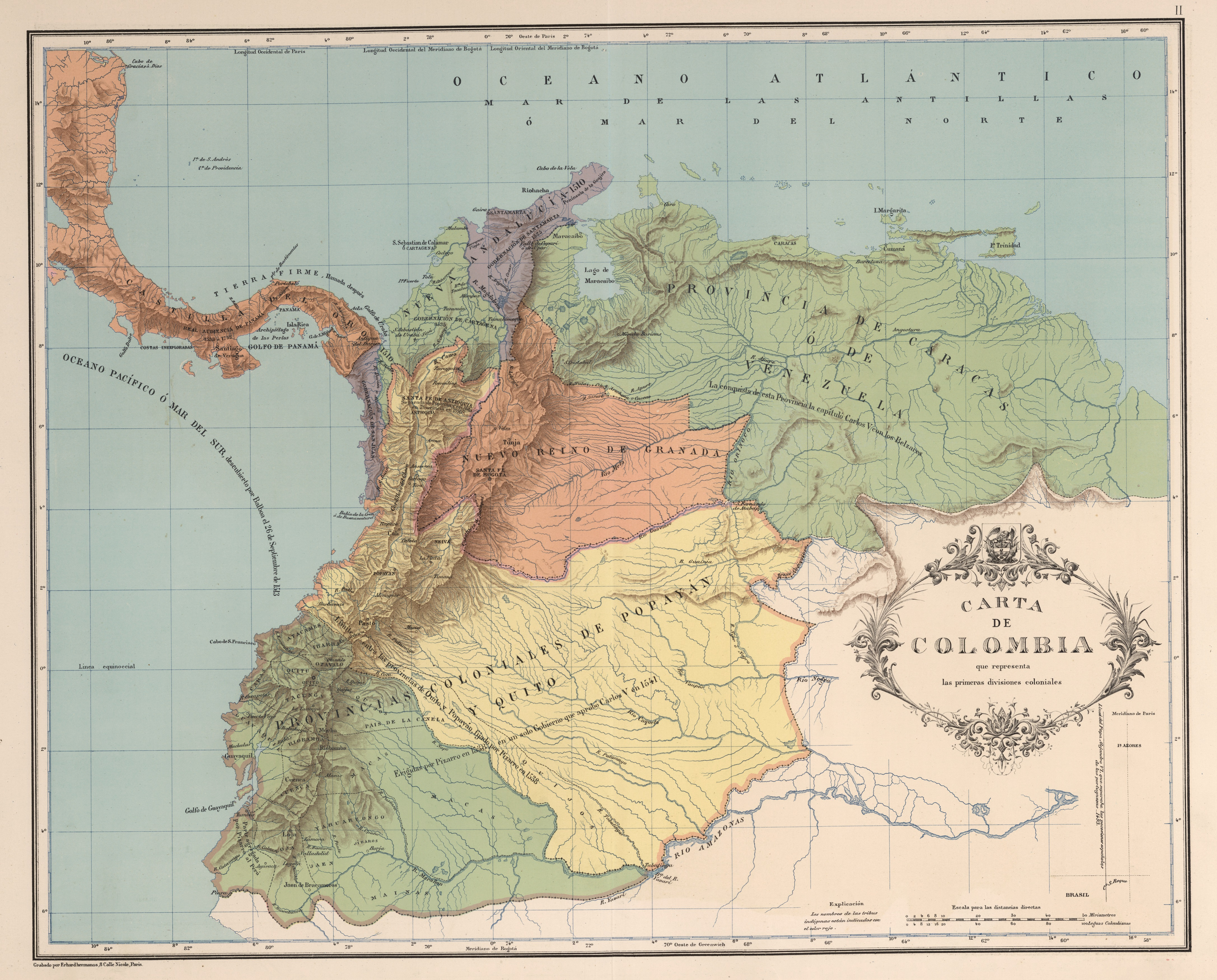
First colonial divisions of Colombia, Ecuador and Venezuela, 1538. Klein-Venedig is called Provincia de Caracas in the map.

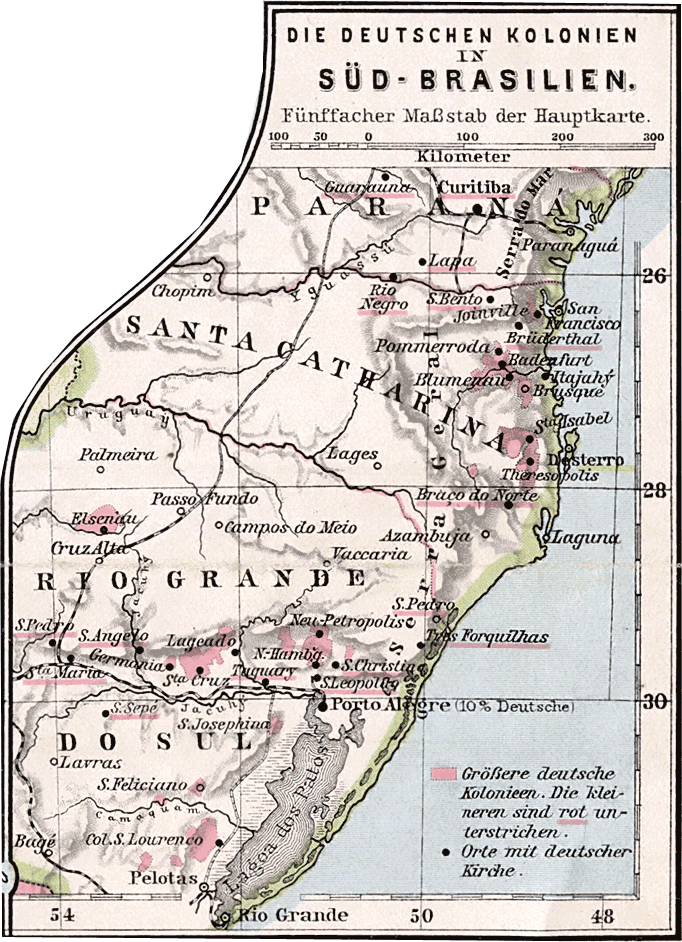
German settlement in Southern Brazil. Major places in red and black spots for towns with German churches.

=== Duchy of Courland ===
The Duchy of Courland, a German-led vassal state of the Polish–Lithuanian Commonwealth, leased New Courland (Neu-Kurland) on Tobago in the Caribbean from the English. The colony failed and was restored several times. A final Courish attempt to establish a Caribbean colony involved a settlement near modern Toco on Trinidad.

=== County of Hanau ===
The counties of Hanau-Lichtenberg and Hanau-Münzenberg, under Frederick Casimir and his adviser Johann Becher, funded – but did not complete – an extravagant program to lease Guiana from the Dutch West India Company. Calling his new realm the Hanauish-Indies (Hanauisch-Indien), Frederick Casimir ran up huge debts that ultimately forced him into a regency by some of his relatives.

== See also ==
- German interest in the Caribbean, German efforts in 1867–1917
- German colonial empire, after 1880
- German colonization in Rio Grande do Sul – Brazilian project to populate the south of Brazil with German immigrants
- German colonization of Valdivia, Osorno and Llanquihue – 1850–1875 colonization scheme in Chile
- Nueva Germania
- Pozuzo, a Peruvian community of German origin.
- Blumenau
- Colonia Tovar
- Planned Nazi coup and invasion of Uruguay – Failed plan suppressed in 1940
