= Parroquia Guárico =

Populated place in Venezuela

- Coordinates: 9.6206°N 69.7955°W

Parroquia Guarico is located in Morán Municipality, Lara State, Venezuela. As of 2005 it had 17,229 inhabitants.

== See also ==
- Parroquia
- Guárico (disambiguation)
