= José Ángel Lamas =

Venezuelan classical musician and composer (1775–1814)

- Born: August 2, 1775; Caracas, Province of Caracas, Spanish Empire
- Died: December 10, 1814 (aged 39); Caracas

José Ángel Lamas (August 2, 1775 – December 10, 1814) was a Venezuelan classical musician and composer born in Caracas. He was the main representative of the classical period in colonial Venezuela.

Author of the immortal sacred piece, Popule Meus, his most important and best known piece. It was composed in 1801, and premiered in Caracas Cathedral during the colonial-provincial period. Lamas, away from politics and the whirlpool of the independence war, dedicated his life to music and specifically religious music. As a member of the School of Chacao, in 1789 he played Tiple and Bajón Chirimía in the cathedral orchestra. He played the chirimía, an ancient medieval Spanish instrument, which preceded the oboe. From 1796 until his death on the December 10, 1814, José Ángel Lamas was Maestro Bajonista or Main Bassoonist of the orchestra.

Among his pieces are, En Premio a tus Virtudes (As a Prize to Your Virtues), Sepulto Domino (Sepulted Lord), Ave Maris Stella (Ave Star Mary), Misa en re (Mass in D), Benedicta et Venerabilis (Blessed and Venerable).

José Ángel Lamas died at 39 on December 10, 1814, and was buried in Saint Paul's church in Caracas. His bones were never found when later Antonio Guzmán Blanco demolished the church and subsequently built the Teatro Municipal de Caracas' (Municipal Theatre of Caracas) on it.

== See also ==
- Venezuela
- Venezuelan music
