= Klein-Venedig =

16th-century German colony in Venezuela

Little Venice Klein-Venedig
- 1528–1546
- Coat of arms of the House of Welser

- Location of Klein-Venedig Full controlled area by the House of Welser in dark green Allowed expeditions by the Spanish Empire light green
- Status: Colony of the Free Imperial Cities of Augsburg and Nuremberg
- Capital: Neu-Augsburg
- Common languages: German
- Religion: Roman Catholicism, Lutheranism
- History
  - Established: 1528
  - Disestablished: 1546
Preceded by	Succeeded by
Venezuela Province	Venezuela Province
- Today part of: Venezuela; Colombia

Klein-Venedig (German for 'Little Venice') or Welserland (German pronunciation: [ˈvɛlzɐlant]) was the name of the Province of Venezuela between 1528 to 1546 when it was under the rule of the wealthy Welser banking and patrician family of the Free Imperial Cities of Augsburg and Nuremberg. It obtained colonial rights in return for debts owed by the Holy Roman Emperor Charles V, who was also King of Spain. In 1528, Charles V issued a charter granting the House of Welser the rights to explore, rule and colonize the area, also with the motivation of searching for the legendary golden city of El Dorado.

Representing the most significant territory of the German colonization of the Americas, the venture was led at first by Ambrosius Ehinger, who founded Maracaibo in 1529. After the deaths of Ehinger (1533) and then his successor Georg von Speyer (1540), Philipp von Hutten continued exploration in the interior, and in his absence from the capital of the province, the crown of Spain claimed the right to appoint the governor. On Hutten's return to the capital, Santa Ana de Coro, in 1546, the Spanish governor Juan de Carvajal had von Hutten and Bartholomeus VI. Welser executed. King Charles V revoked Welser's charter.

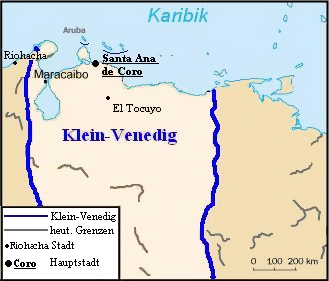
Location of Klein-Venedig

Welser transported to the colony German miners, and 4,000 African slaves as labor to work sugar cane plantations. Many of the German colonists died of tropical diseases or were attacked and killed during frequent journeys deep into native territory in search of gold.

== Background ==
Bartholomeus V. Welser was the head of the banking firm of Welser brothers, who claimed descent from the Byzantine general Belisarius. They possessed great riches, and Bartholomeus was created a prince of the Empire and made privy councillor to the Emperor Charles V, to whom he lent large sums. For the repayment of these debts the Emperor (also King of Spain) granted, in 1527, the newly discovered Province of Venezuela. The Welser were obligated to conquer the country at their own expenses, enlist only Spanish and Flemish troops, fit out two expeditions of four vessels, and build two cities and three forts within two years after taking possession. As Venezuela was reputed to contain gold mines, Welser later obtained permission to send out 150 German miners. Heinrich Ehinger and Hieronymus Sailer, either independently or as agents of the House of Welser, negotiated the rights.

== Search for El Dorado ==
=== Ambrosius Ehinger ===
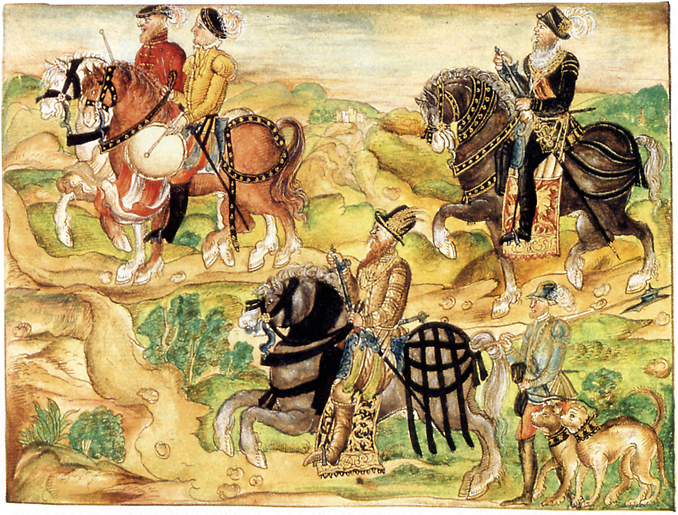
Inspection of the Welser army by Georg von Speyer (right) and Philipp von Hutten (center) at Sanlúcar de Barrameda

In accordance with his contract, Welser armed a fleet, which sailed from Sanlúcar de Barrameda, Spain, early in 1528, under the command of Ambrosius Ehinger, whom he appointed captain general. The House of Welser set up a colonization scheme and sent Ehinger as governor to Santa Ana de Coro (German: Neu-Augsburg), the capital of the Province of Venezuela. Ehinger left Seville on 7 October 1528 with the Spaniard García de Lerma and 281 settlers. At Santo Domingo, de Lerma with 50 companions left for Santa Marta, to reestablish Spanish control following the murder of the governor there. Ehinger and the remainder headed for the Venezuelan coast and landed on 24 February 1529 at Santa Ana de Coro. Almost immediately Ehinger replaced his Welser-appointed Spanish deputy González de Leyva with Nicolaus Federmann.

From Coro, he explored the interior in search of the legendary golden city of El Dorado. In August 1529 Ehinger made his first expedition to Lake Maracaibo, which was bitterly opposed by the indigenous people, the Coquivacoa. After winning a series of bloody battles, he founded the settlement at Maracaibo on 8 September 1529. Ehinger named the city New Nuremberg (German: Neu-Nürnberg) and the lake after the valiant chieftain Mara of the Coquivacoa, who had died in the fighting. The city was renamed Maracaibo after the Spanish took possession.

Ehinger came down with malaria and decided to recuperate in the relatively civilized comforts of Hispaniola, handing temporary authority over to Federmann on July 30, 1530. Upon his return, Ehinger, with 40 horses and 130 foot soldiers and an uncounted number of allied Indians, set off from Coro on September 1, 1531, on his second expedition to the alleged gold country to the west. They crossed the Oca and Valledupar mountains of the Serranía del Perijá, moved along the Cesar River, and finally to the Zapatosa marsh. There the expedition rested about three months, then it continued south, where it met fierce resistance from the indigenous tribes, so it turned east, along the Lebrija River. During the expedition, the men were forced to eat their horses and dogs, and lost most of their Indian allies, many dying from the cold as they crossed the mountains. As they made their way home, they were attacked by the Chitareros on 27 May 1533. Ehinger and Captain Estéban Martín fled into a low-lying ravine, where they were pinned down by Indians shooting arrows. Ehinger received a poisoned arrow in the neck. Despite the attentions of Augustine father Vicente de Requejada, Ehinger died on 31 May 1533, and was buried under a tree. The expedition returned without him to Coro.

=== Later governors ===
Returning to Europe after Ehinger's death, Georg von Speyer was among the young fortune seekers solicited by the Welsers to colonize New Granada in 1534. Speyer obtained from Charles V the appointment of governor of Venezuela, despite the claims of Nikolaus Federmann, who had been Ehinger's lieutenant. He armed a new expedition in Spain and the Canary Islands, and on 22 February 1534, landed at Coro.

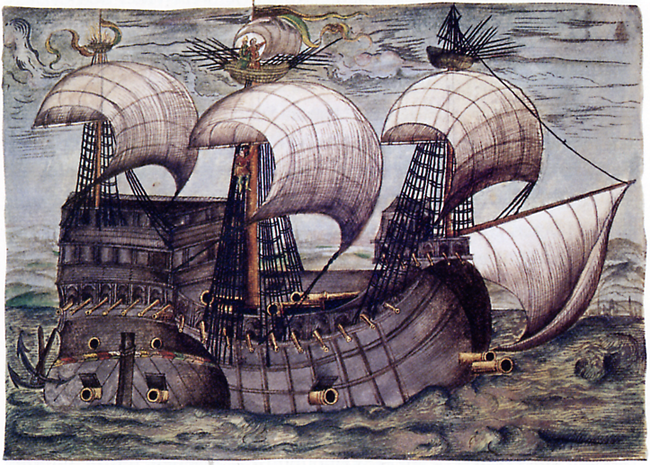
The La Santa Trinidad, in which Philipp von Hutten crossed the Atlantic in 1535

Between 1535 and 1538, he searched in southwestern Venezuela and northern Colombia for "El Dorado", in the company of Nikolaus Federmann and then with Philipp von Hutten. Against advice, Speyer had appointed Federmann his lieutenant. Accompanied by 450 regular troops and 1,500 friendly Indians, they set out on a journey of exploration to the interior. Leaving from the town of Rio de Hacha, they followed the eastern flank of the cordillera following the existing salt trade route where it crossed the Andes and entered the lands of the Chibcha. The Muisca were an advanced culture whose realm had already been partially conquered by Jiménez de Quesada out of Santa Marta, under orders from Pedro Fernández de Lugo.

After marching together for about 200 miles, Speyer and Federmann divided into two parties, agreeing to meet afterward. Speyer experienced great hardships from hostile Indians, and the soldiers, unaccustomed to marching under a burning sun, mutinied several times. When at last they reached the appointed place of meeting without finding any trace of Federmann, the soldiers were discouraged. Federmann crossed the Andes to Bogotá, where he and Sebastián de Belalcázar contested Gonzalo Jiménez de Quesada's claims to that province.

Without Federmann, Speyer animated his troops with the hope of discovering the riches of the El Dorado, of which the survivors of Ehinger's expedition, Federmann among them, had brought the first reports. They continued the march to the south, but, when the rainy season set in, the overflow of the rivers impeded progress, and the consequent fevers decimated their ranks. Speyer persevered for a long time in his search for the El Dorado, until at last his progress was arrested by a mighty river, probably the Orinoco, or its confluent, the Apure, and early in 1539 he returned to Coro empty-handed with only 80 ragged and sickly men out of the host he had begun with more than four years before.

Because of ill health, von Speyer resigned as governor in 1539, and he died in June 1540.

In December 1540 Philipp von Hutten became governor (captain-general) of Venezuela. Hutten then continued the search in the interior. After several years of wandering, harassed by the natives and weakened by hunger and fevers, he and his followers came on a large city, the capital of the Omaguas, in the country north of the Amazons, where they were routed by the Indians, and Hutten was severely wounded. He led those of his followers who survived back to Coro, in 1546, to find that a Spaniard, Juan de Carvajal, had been appointed by the Royal Audiencia of Santo Domingo to preserve order in Venezuela.

As the years had gone by with no news of Hutten and his followers, Carvajal had founded El Tocuyo with settlers of Coro and begun to feel secure in his position, and the return of the German adventurers was not welcome to him. When he saw how diminished they were in number, he thought to force from them an acknowledgment of his authority. He failed when was wounded by a traveling companion of Hutten's, Bartholomeus VI. Welser (the younger), in a subsequent attempt to seize them.

Carvajal was forced to pledge the Germans safe passage to Coro on the coast. The adventurers took no precautions against attack while journeying there, and were easily captured by Carvajal in April 1546. After keeping Hutten and Welser in chains for a time, he had them beheaded. Some years later, the abdication of Charles V in 1556 meant the definitive end of the Welser's attempt to re-assert their concession by legal means.

=== List of governors, lieutenant-governors, mayors, and captains-general (1528–1556) ===
Image	Name	Term	Notes
	Ambrose von Ehinger	1529–1530	Hispanicized as Ambrosio Alfinger
	Georg von Ehinger	1530	Hispanicized as Jorge Ehinger. Tried to seize control of the government but was repulsed
	Hans Seissenhofer von Key	1530	Hispanicized as Juan Alemán or Juan 'El Bueno' . A captain and acting Lieutenant-Governor
	Bartholomeus Sayler	1531–1533	Hispanicized as Bartolomé de Santillana
	Ambrose von Ehinger	1533	Hispanicized as Ambrosio Alfinger
	Nicolas Federmann	1533–1535	Hispanicized as Nicolás de Federmán. Lieutenant-Governor of Neu-Augsburg after the death of A. Ehinger
	Georg Hohermut von Speyer	1535–1540	Hispanicized as Jorge de Espira
	Heinrich Remboldt	1540–1543	Hispanicized as Enrique Remboldt; Mayor of Neu-Augsburg and acting Governor. Commanded his Lieutenant-Governor Juan de Villegas to found the city of Barquisimeto. This was eventually done in 1552, 8 years after Remboldt's death
	Philipp von Hutten	1543–1544	Hispanicized as Felipe de Utre or Felipe de Hutten; Served as Lieutenant-Governor
	Melchior Grübel	1557–?	Acting mayor of El Tocuyo and Neu-Augsburg

== See also ==
- German colonial projects before 1871
- List of former German colonies
