= Guárico (disambiguation) =

Guárico is a state of Venezuela.

Guárico may also refer to:

- Guárico River, Venezuela
- Parroquia Guárico, a parroquia in the state of Lara, Venezuela
- Cap-Haïtien, Haiti; historically known by the indigenous Taino name Guárico
