= Juan de Carvajal =

16th-century Spanish conquistador and governor

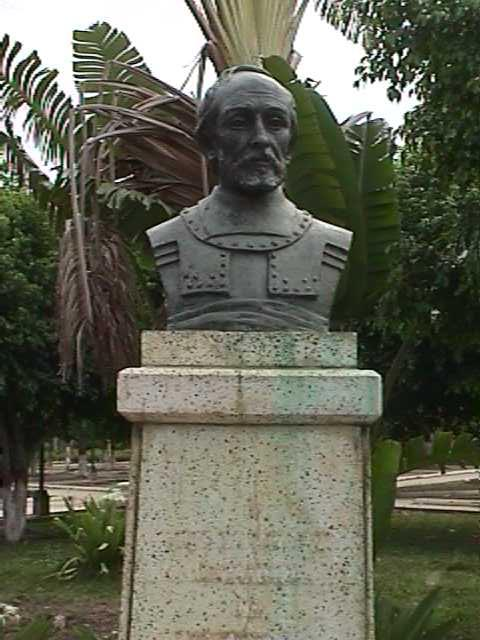
- statue of Juan de Carvajal in El Tocuyo
- Born: c. 1511; Villafranca de los Barros, Crown of Castile, Kingdom of Spain
- Died: 16 September 1546; Santa Ana de Coro, Province of Venezuela, Viceroyalty of New Spain
- Cause of death: Hanging
- Years active: 1529-1546
- Employer: Real Audiencia of Santo Domingo
- Known for: Executing Phillip Von Hutten, leading to the end of the Welser Concessions in Venezuela.
- Notable work: Founding Tocuyo
- Title: Governor of the Province of Venezuela
- Term: 1st of January 1545 - August 1546
- Predecessor: Juan de Frias
- Successor: Juan perez de tolosa
- Criminal charge: Murder
- Criminal penalty: Death Penalty

Juan de Carvajal (c. 1511 – 16 September 1546) was a Spanish conquistador and one of the first governors of Venezuela Province. Carvajal was born in Villafranca de los Barros, Extremadura, in the Kingdom of Spain.

== Time in the New World ==
Carvajal arrived with Ambrosius Ehinger's expedition for Santa Ana de Coro known to the Welser Family, who had been granted the colony of Klein-Venedig from Charles V as a payment for debts, as Neu-Augsburg in 1529. He became the Attorney General of the entire province of Venezuela and he also served as a public notary in Maracaibo and Santa Ana del Coro. Carvajal believed the Welser family to not be completing their part of the treaty granting them Venezuela, noting the poor living conditions and the neglectful administration of Klein-Venedig. Thus, being the attorney general of the province of Venezuela, he sued them in a trial of residence that he opened against George Von Speyer. The case concluded in 1540 due to Speyer's death.

=== Governorship ===
Carvajal left for Santo Domingo to serve as the Rapporteur of the Real Audiencia of Santo Domingo in 1540 after the trial's conclusion, a position he held until December 1543. He then left for Coro to govern with the interim governor of the province of Venezuela Juan de Frias, in Phillip von Hutten's absence, who was believed to have died in his expedition to find El Dorado which started on 1 August 1541 with Bartholomeus VI. Welser. A year later, when Juan de Frias left for the Island of Margarita, Carvajal assumed the complete position of Interim Governor. He appointed Juan de Villegas as his Lieutenant General.

=== Founding of Tocuyo ===
Carvajal founded the city of El Tocuyo on December 7, 1545, originally named Nuestra Señora de la Pura y Limpia Concepción del Tocuyo. This city served as the new capital for the colonists with many of the inhabitants of Coro moving to Tocuyo.

=== Capture and execution of Hutten ===
Hutten and his party reach Neu-Augsburg (Coro) in April 1546 where they found the colony under Carvajal's administration. Carvajal was unwilling to give up control of the colony and a fight ensued, leaving Carvajal seriously injured. The Germans fled to the port of Coro where they are intercepted and incarcerated. He kept them in chains for a while and eventually ordered their execution through decapitation on Good Friday, 17 May.

== Repercussion for his crimes ==
Carvajal stayed in Tocuyo, where a month and a half later he was captured by judge Juan Perez de Tolosa's forces. A trial of residence against Carvajal for the murder of Hutten was opened in Coro, with Tolosa serving as the judge. Carvajal argued that he ordered the execution in defense of the people's interests and mentioned the horrible conditions the Welser Family had put upon Venezuela. He insisted that the executions were for a greater good. He lost the case and on 16 September, Judge Juan Perez de Tolosa sentenced Carvajal to death by hanging but with a peculiar specification that he had to be carried to the gallows by tying him to the tail of a horse. He was executed later the same day.
