= Juan Martínez de Ampiés =

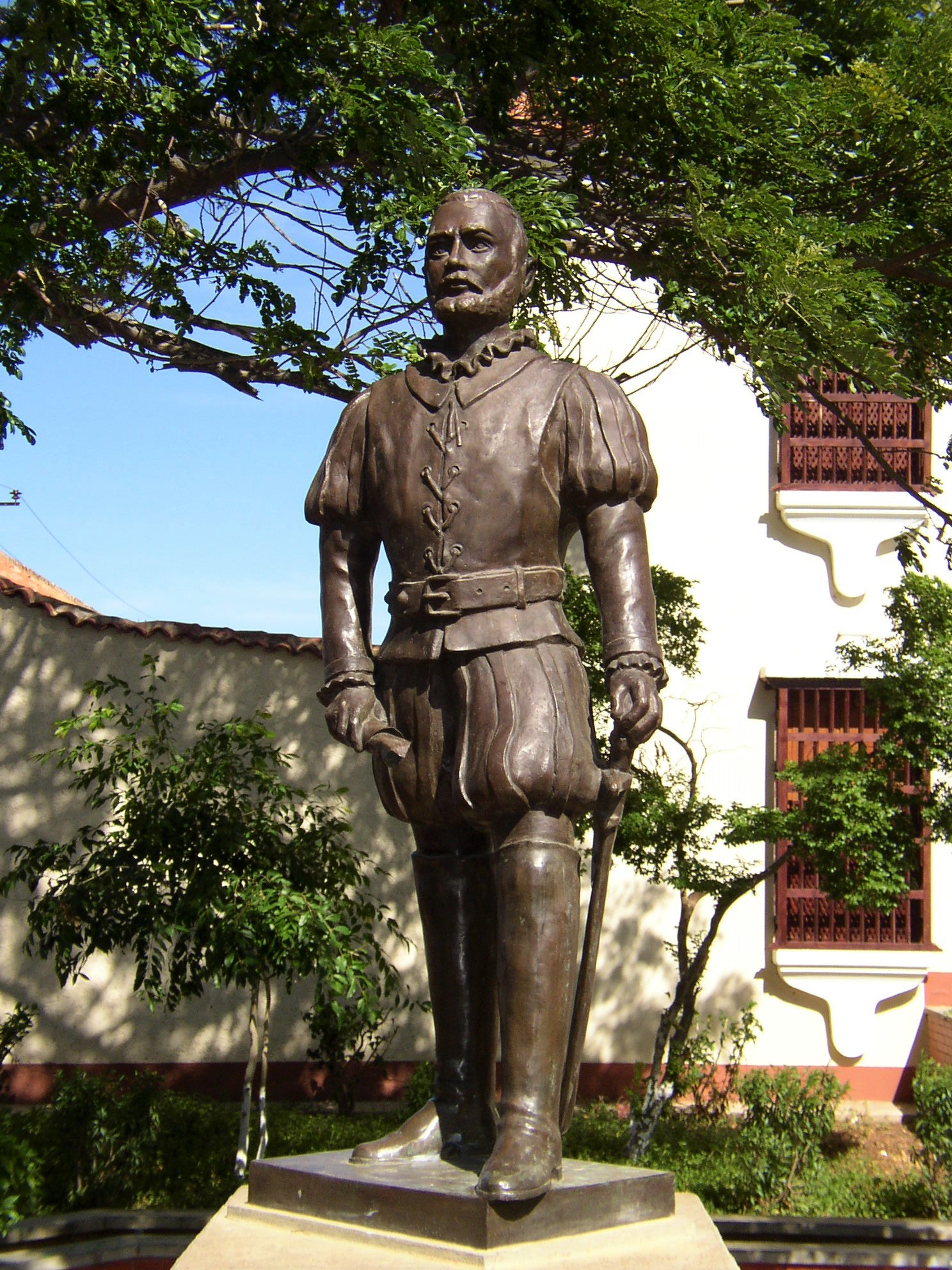
Juan de Ampies

Juan Martínez de Ampiés (also spelled Ampués; Martínez sometimes given as Martín; died 1533), as an officer of the Spanish army, was the first governor of Venezuela Province (1527-1529). He founded Santa Ana de Coro in July 1527. He left Venezuela after the Welsers asserted the colonial rights they had negotiated with Charles V, Holy Roman Emperor (and King of Spain), launching the German colonization of the Americas.

He was also governor of Santo Domingo (the Captaincy General of Santo Domingo).

By 1514, the Hispaniola treasury staff put in place by Ferdinand, included Gil González Dávila, who had replaced Cristóbal de Cuéllar as contador, Miguel de Pasamonte, who had been named treasurer general of the Indies in April 1508, and Juan de Ampíes as factor.
