= Georg von Speyer =

German conquistador in New Granada and Venezuela

- Born: 1500; Speyer, Rhineland-Palatinate, Germany
- Died: 11 June 1540 (aged 39–40); Santa Ana de Coro, Klein-Venedig, Holy Roman Empire

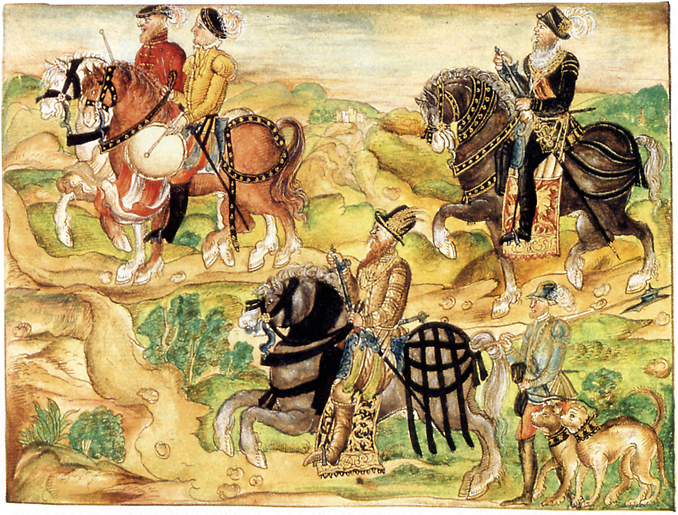
Inspection of the Welser army by Georg von Speyer (right) and Philipp von Hutten (center) at Sanlúcar de Barrameda.

Georg von Speyer (1500, Speyer, Holy Roman Empire – 11 June 1540, Coro, Klein-Venedig) was a German conquistador in New Granada and Venezuela. His birth name was Georg Hohermuth but he chose to call himself after his place of birth. He is sometimes referred to as Jorge de Espira, his name in Spanish. He is a significant figure in the history of Klein-Venedig (1528 - 1546), the concession of Venezuela Province to the Welser banking family by Charles I of Spain.

== Biography ==
As a boy, he entered the banking house of Anton and Bartholomeus V. Welser of Augsburg, and worked his way up as their confidential agent, accompanying in the latter capacity the fleet that was armed by the Welsers in 1528, and sent under Ambrosius Ehinger to conquer New Granada. Returning to Europe after Ehinger's death, Speyer was among the young fortune seekers solicited by the Welsers to colonize New Granada in 1534. Speyer obtained from Charles V the appointment of governor of New Granada, despite the claims of Nikolaus Federmann, who had been Ehinger's lieutenant. He armed a new expedition in Spain and the Canary Islands, and on 22 February 1534, landed at Coro.

Between 1535 and 1538 he searched in southwestern Venezuela and northern Colombia for “El Dorado,” in the company of Nikolaus Federmann and then with Philipp von Hutten. Against advice, Speyer had appointed Federmann his lieutenant. Accompanied by 450 regular troops and 1,500 friendly Indians, they set out on a journey of exploration to the interior. Leaving from the town of Rio Hacha, they followed the eastern flank of the cordilla following the existing salt trade route where it crossed the Andes and entered the lands of the Chibcha. The Chibcha were an advance culture whose realm had already been partially conquered by Jiménez de Quesada out of Santa Marta, now Colombia, under orders from Pedro Fernández de Lugo.

After marching together for about 200 miles, Speyer and Federmann divided into two parties, agreeing to meet afterward. Speyer experienced great hardships from hostile Indians, and the soldiers, unaccustomed to march under a burning sun, mutinied several times. When at last they reached the appointed place of meeting without finding any trace of Federmann, the soldiers were discouraged.

But Speyer animated them with the hope of discovering the riches of the El Dorado, of which the survivors of Ehinger's expedition, Federmann among them, had brought the first reports. They continued the march to the south, but, when the rainy season set in, the overflow of the rivers impeded progress, and the consequent fevers decimated their ranks. Speyer persevered for a long time in his search for the El Dorado, until at last his progress was arrested by a mighty river, probably the Orinoco, or its confluent, the Apure, and early in 1539 he returned to Coro empty handed with only 80 ragged and sickly men out of the host he had led forth more than four years before.

Because of ill health he resigned as governor in 1539. He set out immediately for Europe to lay his complaint against Federmann before the Welsers, but heard in Santo Domingo of the former's return to Spain, and was persuaded by the Real Audiencia to return to his government, where he died soon afterward. Speyer's narrative to Charles V, which he sent from Santo Domingo, is said to have been published, but no copy of it is known to exist. In 1900, it was hoped that the manuscript might be among the papers in the archives at Simancas which the Spanish government was then publishing.
