= Juan de Pimentel =

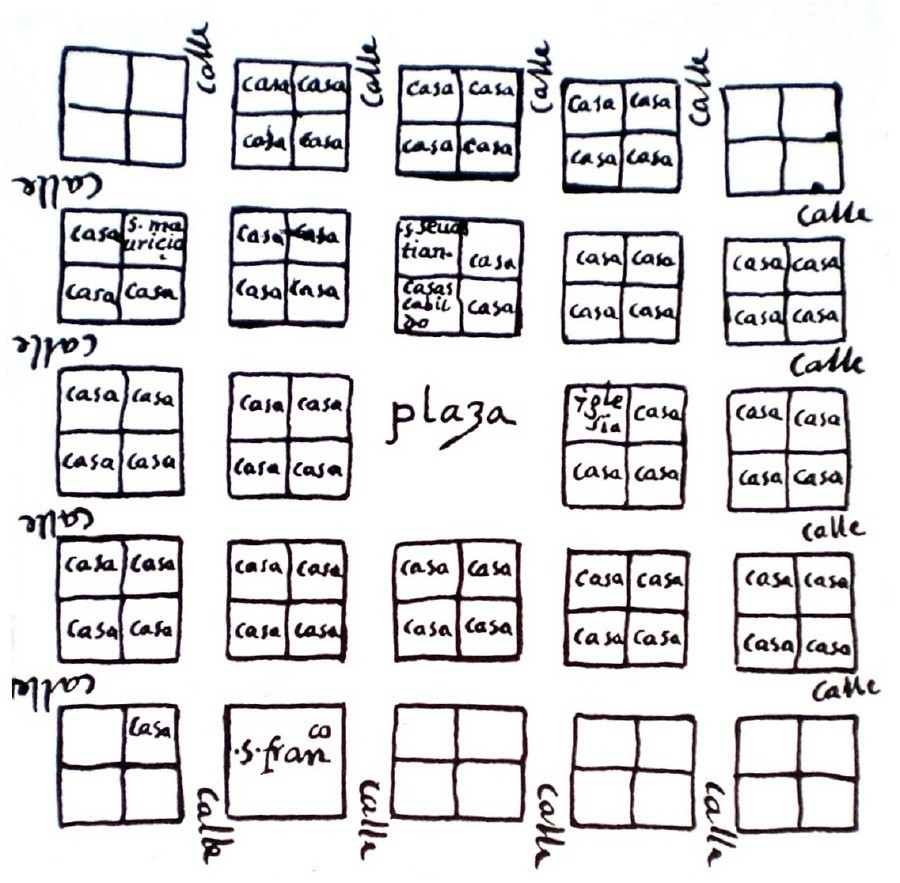
First map of Caracas, by Juan de Pimentel

Juan de Pimentel was an early governor of Venezuela Province, the Venezuela Province being one of the Spanish Empire. Under his governorship (1576 - 1583) the capital of the Province was moved from El Tocuyo to Caracas. He was a Knight of the Order of Santiago.
