= Nikolaus Federmann =

16th-century German conquistador in South America

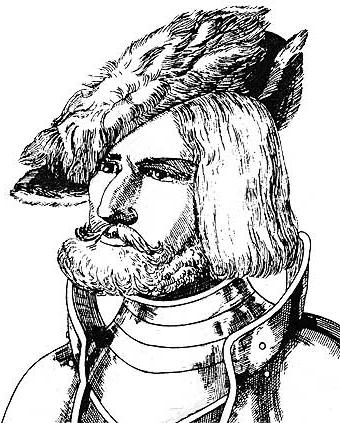
- Portrait of Nikolaus Federmann
- Born: ~1505; Ulm, Free Imperial City of Ulm
- Died: February 1542 (aged ~37); Valladolid, Spain
- Other names: Nicolás de Federmán
- Occupations: Conquistador
- Years active: 1529->1539
- Employer(s): Welser family of Augsburg; Spanish Crown
- Known for: Deputy leader of Klein Venedig; Quest for El Dorado; Spanish conquest of the Muisca
- Notable work: Indianische Historia. Ein schöne kurtzweilige Historia Niclaus Federmanns des Jüngern von Ulm erster raise (1557, post mortem)

Nikolaus Federmann (Spanish: Nicolás Féderman, pronounced [nikoˈlas ðe 'feðeɾman]) (c. 1505, Ulm – February 1542, Valladolid) was a German adventurer and conquistador in what is modern-day Venezuela and Colombia. He is a significant figure in the history of Klein-Venedig (1528–1546), the concession of Venezuela Province that Charles I of Spain granted to the Welser banking family and the foundation of Santafe de Bogotá.

== Life ==
Nikolaus Federmann was born in Ulm (Baden-Württemberg) around 1505. In 1529, he was sent to Santo Domingo by the Welser family of Augsburg, who had signed an agreement to explore the territory of Venezuela. As an agent of the Welser family, Federmann took settlers and miners from Seville to Coro in Venezuela in 1529 and 1530. Upon his arrival the governor Ambrosius Ehinger appointed him as his deputy. On 30 July 1530 Federmann became responsible for the colony of "Little Venice" (Klein Venedig). Governor Ehinger temporarily handed over authority to Federmann, because he had to go Hispaniola for health reasons.

Without the authorisation of the Real Audiencia of Santo Domingo, Federmann undertook an expedition in September 1530 in the northern river basin of the Orinoco, searching for the "South Sea" (the Pacific), with 110 foot soldiers, 16 mounted soldiers, and 100 natives. However, he did not achieve his goal to open a new trade route to Asia. On 17 March 1531 he returned to Coro with 5,565 pesos of gold. Because of the unauthorized expedition, the governor Ehinger banished Federmann to Europe for a period of four years.

When he returned to Augsburg, he wrote Indianische Historia. Ein schöne kurtzweilige Historia Niclaus Federmanns des Jüngern von Ulm erster raise (published in 1557).

=== Expedition in La Guajira ===
Leaving from Coro in Paraguaná, Federmann left for the present-day territory of La Guajira, in northernmost Colombia. One of his goals was to secure the pearls that can be found in the Caribbean waters at the coast, and one version of history has it that he founded Riohacha in 1535. However, Federmann did not secure native divers to search for pearls, and his mission to found a city he wanted to call "Ulma", after his place of birth Ulm, failed. Federmann returned to Coro after reaching Cabo de la Vela in February 1536 without having founded a settlement on the Caribbean coast of La Guajira.

=== Foundation of Bogotá ===
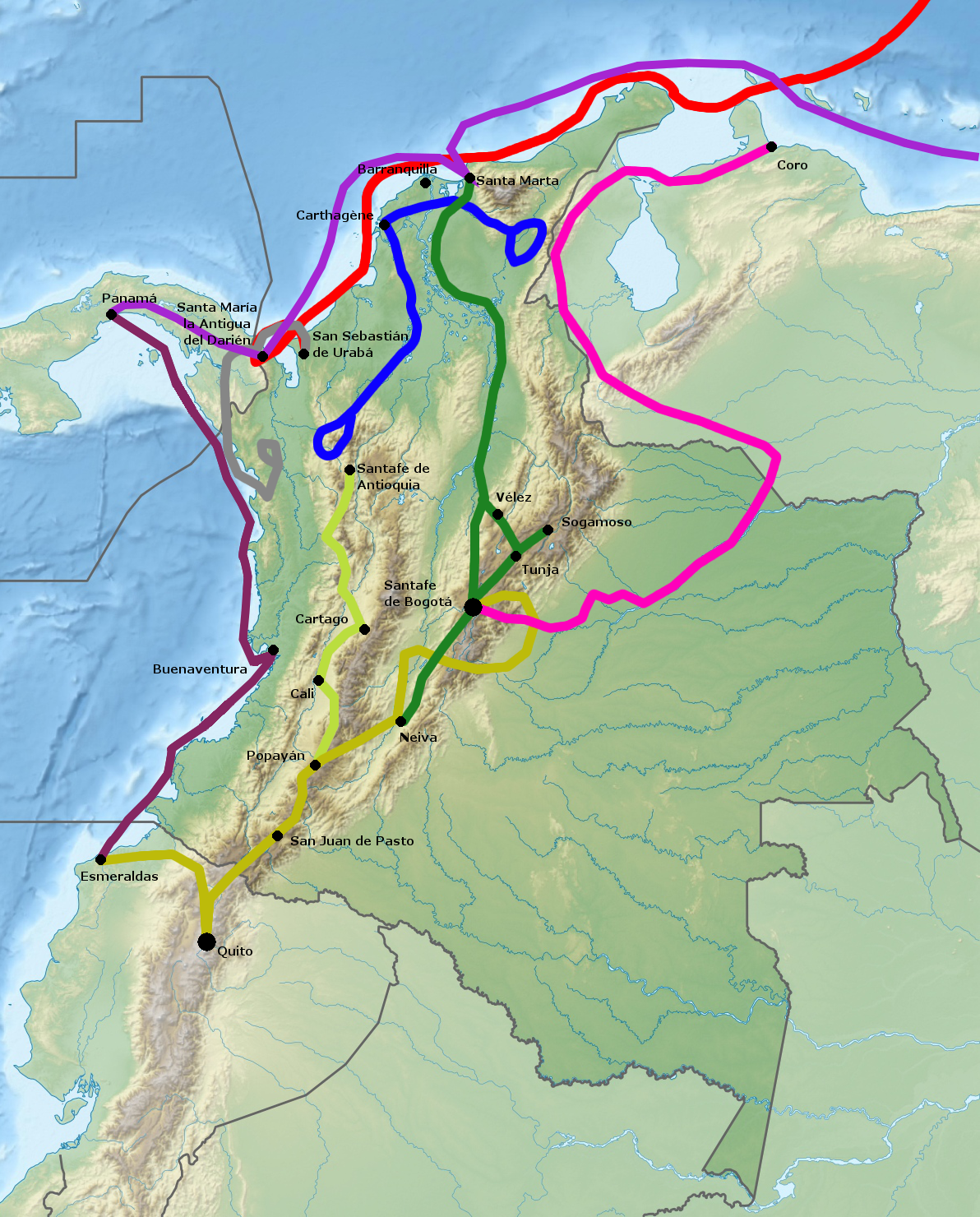
Explored route of Federmann in Venezuela and eastern Colombia in pink, route back to Cartagena in green

From Coro, he traveled along the eastern edges of the Eastern Ranges of the Colombian Andes, through the Llanos and, following the salt trade route, he encountered the eastern part of the Muisca Confederation. Their realm had already been largely conquered and occupied by Gonzalo Jiménez de Quesada, who considered the arrival of another conquistador unpleasant. Together with Sebastián de Belalcázar, Federmann re-founded the city of Bogotá on 27 April 1539. Jiménez de Quesada had failed to fulfill the official requirements of the Spanish Crown concerning the founding of a settlement when he attempted to establish a first Bogotá on 6 August 1538. The three leaders of the conquest expeditions; Gonzalo Jiménez de Quesada, Sebastián de Belalcázar and Federmann, met in Bosa and agreed to travel back to Spain to ask for compensation for their exploration for the Spanish Crown. Gonzalo assigned his brother Hernán Pérez de Quesada as interim governor of the New Kingdom of Granada and chose the first mayor and council for the capital. The chaplain of the team of Federmann, Juan Verdejo, was named priest. Most of the soldiers of the expeditions of Federmann and De Belalcázar decided to stay in Bogotá, reinforcing the troops of De Quesada. Without having found El Dorado, ten years after his arrival in the New World, in mid May 1539, Federmann returned to the Caribbean coast, to sail to Spain from Cartagena. The work Epítome de la conquista del Nuevo Reino de Granada reports they arrived in Spain in November 1539, when the Spanish King was crossing France to reach Flanders.

=== Back in Europe ===
In Europe, Federmann was intercepted by the Welser family, who accused him of breaching his contract and suppressing funds. The Welser family demanded a remuneration of 100,000 ducats in emeralds and 15,000 ducats in gold. Since Federmann could not pay, he spent weeks in an Antwerp prison. Federmann tried to defend himself in court, first in Ghent and finally in Valladolid before the Council of the Indies. He filed counter-lawsuits, accusing the Welser family of evading taxes and acting against the interests of the Spanish king. On 19 October 1541 Federmann finally agreed to a settlement. The Welser family abandoned their financial revendications, and Federmann ceded the property rights of his lands in New Granada.

Accused by the Welser family of unfaithfulness, and suspected of being a Lutheran by the Inquisition, Federmann died in February 1542 in prison in Valladolid.

== Works ==
- "Indianische Historia. Ein schöne kurtzweilige Historia Niclaus Federmanns des Jüngern von Ulm erster raise" (about the first expedition), 1557 in Hagenau

== Miscellaneous ==
- As a homage to his figure a pedestrian statue of Nikolaus Federmann was unveiled in the Parque de los Cañones of Rio Hacha (Colombia), one of the few that has not been demolished or destroyed like that of other conquistadors of the New World
- There is a neighborhood in Bogotá named Nicolás de Federmán, the Spanish rendering of his own name and as he was known by his fellow Spanish conquistadors.
