= Coquivacoa =

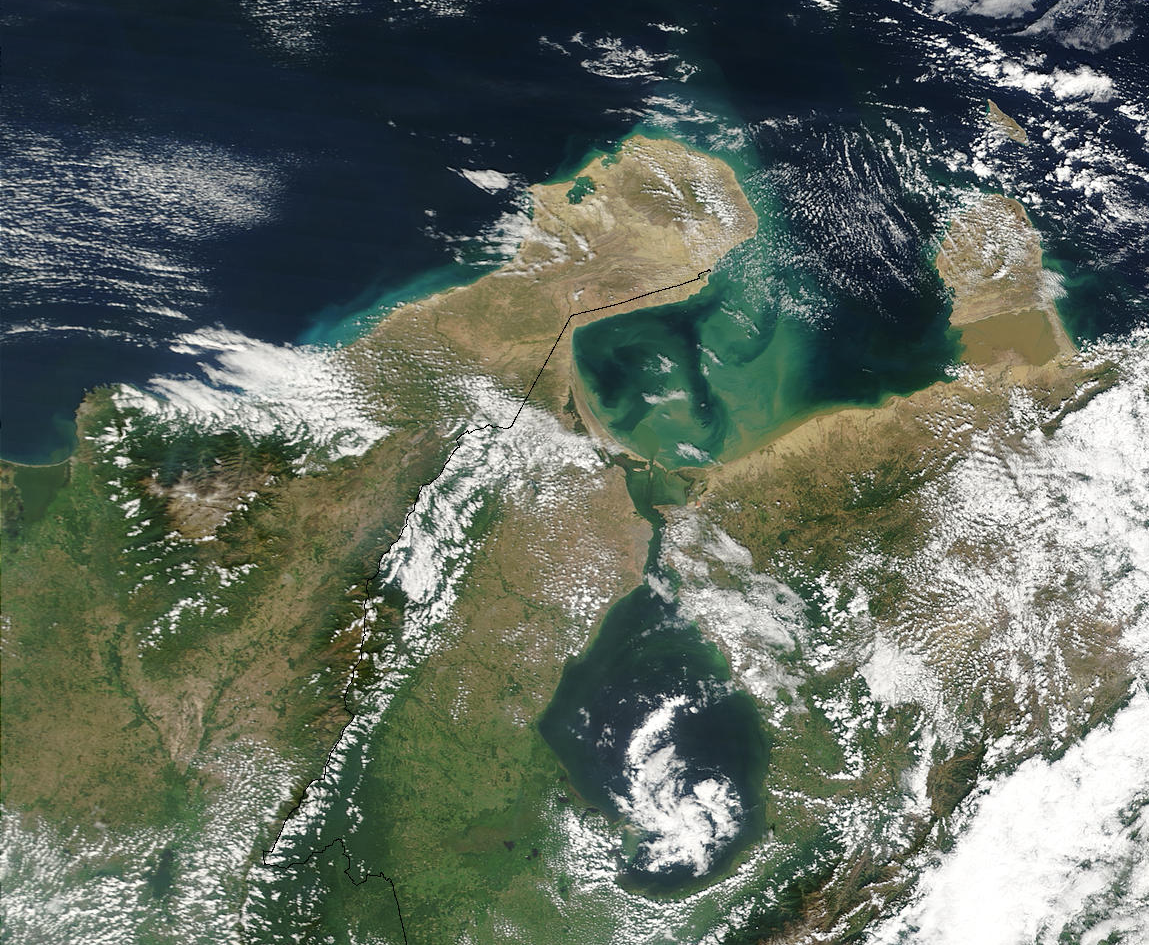
The diagonal Guajira Peninsula on the left of the rectangular Gulf of Venezuela and above the tear-drop-shaped Lake Maracaibo. Each of these has been labelled Coquivacoa.

Coquivacoa or Coquibacoa is an indigenous name for an area in north-west Venezuela – either the Gulf of Venezuela (as used by Colombian President Alfonso López Michelsen in 1974) or Lake Maracaibo (as others argue) or possibly the wider region. It may also be the name of an indigenous people itself, in particular the people fought by Ambrosius Ehinger before his 1529 establishment of Maracaibo; the name "Maracaibo" may derive from a Coquivacoa chieftain killed by Ehinger. This people may be related to (or even identical to) the Wayuu or the Caquetio people.

The Spanish conquistador Alonso de Ojeda had been appointed Governor of Coquibacoa in 1501 (june, 10th), a position that only lasted a few months. He had applied the term Coquibacoa to the Guajira Peninsula, which Ojeda erroneously thought was an island.

== Legacy ==
A parish in Maracaibo is named Coquivacoa. Gran Coquivacoa is a Gaita Zuliana group founded in 1968. There is a regional television station named Coquivacoa Televisión. Singer Alí Primera wrote a song called Coquivacoa.

There is a city named Chivacoa in Yaracuy state, founded by Caquetio people.
