= Morán Municipality =

Morán Municipality Municipio Morán
- Municipality
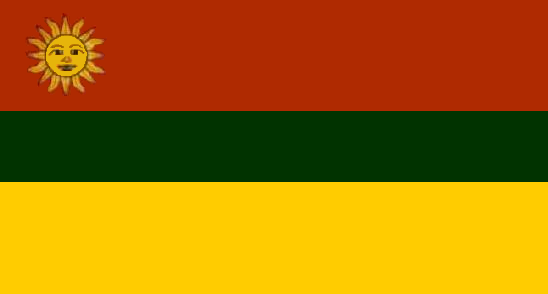
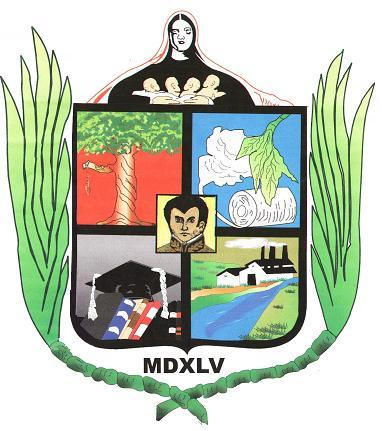
- Flag Coat of arms

- Location in Lara

- Location in Venezuela
- Coordinates: 9°42′18″N 69°51′58″W
- Country: Venezuela
- State: Lara

Government
  - Mayor: Félix Linares Pérez (PSUV)

Area
  - Total: 2,352.1 km^{2} (908.2 sq mi)

Population (2007)
  - Total: 128,674
  - Density: 54.706/km^{2} (141.69/sq mi)
- Time zone: UTC−4 (VET)
- Area code(s): 0253
- Website: Official website

The Morán Municipality is one of the nine municipalities (municipios) that makes up the Venezuelan state of Lara and, according to a 2007 population estimate by the National Institute of Statistics of Venezuela, the municipality has a population of 128,674. The town of El Tocuyo is the shire town of the Morán Municipality.

== History ==
The town of El Tocuyo was founded by Juan de Carvajal in 1545 on the banks of the Tocuyo River and it was the administrative capital of Venezuela from 1546 to 1548. Its original name was Nuestra Señora de la Pura y Limpia Concepción del Tocuyo.

== Geography ==
The surrounding area has good soil and an ideal climate for agriculture, dry and warm with plenty of water available from the Tocuyo River. The area has been occupied for over 20,000 years. When the Spanish arrived they found the "Gayones" Indians, who inhabited this valley, sowing corn and other agricultural products as cotton and yucca. After the Spanish came, sugar cane was, for centuries, the biggest crop; but since 1980 vegetables such as tomatoes, onions, chiles, and potatoes are taking its place.

== Demographics ==
The Morán Municipality, according to a 2011 population estimate by the National Institute of Statistics of Venezuela, has a population of 123,880 (up from 115,166 in 2000). This amounts to 7.2% of the state's population. The municipality's population density is 57.68 inhabitants per square kilometre (149.4/sq mi).

== Government ==
The mayor of the Morán Municipality is Felix Linares, re-elected on July 21, 2025, with 96% of the vote. The municipality is divided into eight parishes; Bolívar, Anzoátegui, Guarico, Hilario Luna y Luna, Humocaro Alto, Humocaro Bajo, La Candelaria, and Morán .

== See also ==
- El Tocuyo
- Lara
- Municipalities of Venezuela
