= Carl Wilhelm Welser von Neunhof =

Merchant and politician (1663–1711)

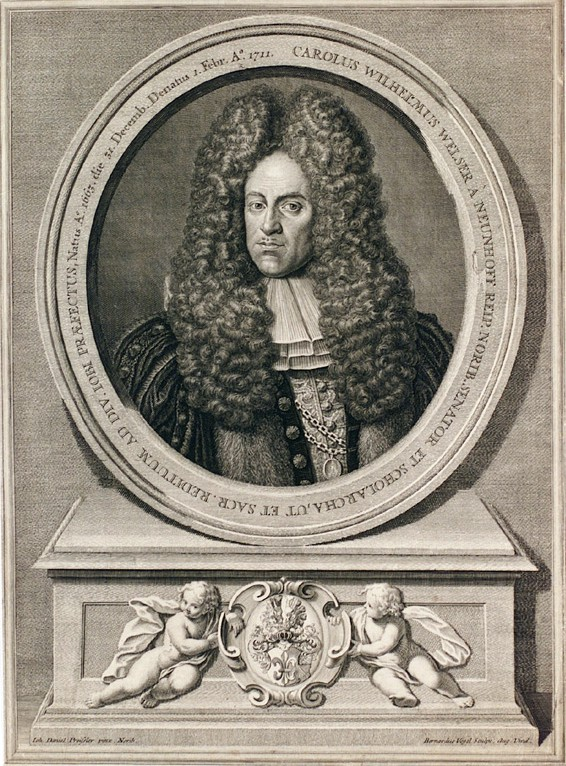
- Carl Wilhelm Welser von Neunhof by Bernhard Vogel (1683–1737)
- Born: 31 December 1663
- Died: 1 February 1711 (aged 47); Nuremberg
- Occupation: mayor of Nuremberg
- Spouse: Clara Sabina Kress von Kressenstein (m.1689)
- Children: son Christoph Carl Welser (1690)
- Parents: Carl Welser (father); Magdalena Barbara Schlüssfelder (mother)

Carl Wilhelm Welser von Neunhof (31 December 1663 – 1 February 1711 Nuremberg) was a mayor of Nuremberg.

He was the son of Carl Welser (born 6 April 1635) and Magdalena Barbara Schlüssfelder (born c. 1645 Nuremberg). He was married to Clara Sabina Kress von Kressenstein (born c. 1665) on 12 August 1689 in Nuremberg, and had a son Christoph Carl Welser, born 1690 in Nuremberg.

The Welser family were affluent merchants in Augsburg and Nuremberg since 1246, and were active in copper, silver and tin mining, owning and operating a large mercantile fleet and starting the spice trade with India. The family had agreements with the Spanish court, giving them a monopoly in the slave trade to Venezuela and the West Indies and the right to ship precious woods, dyes, gold and drugs back to Europe. These rights were lost with the abdication of Charles V in 1556.
