= Henri Ternaux-Compans =

French historian (1807–1864)

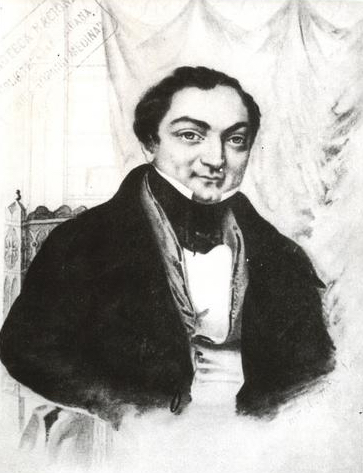

Henri Ternaux-Compans (born in Paris in 1807, died there in December 1864) was a French historian.

== Biography ==
After finishing his studies in Paris, he entered the diplomatic service and was secretary of the embassies at Madrid and Lisbon, and chargé d'affaires in Brazil, but resigned, and devoted several years to travel through Spain and South America, doing research in the state libraries. Toward the close of Louis Philippe's reign he was elected a deputy, but he soon returned to his studies.

== Works ==
Ternaux-Compans collected and published a valuable series of works concerning the discovery and early history of South America. They include:

- Bibliothèque Americaine, ou catalogue des ouvrages relatifs à l'Amérique depuis sa découverte en 1493, jusqu'en l'an 1700 (Paris, 1836)
- Belle et agréable narration du premier voyage de Nicolas Federmann le jeune, d'Ulm aux Indes de la mer Océane et de ce qui lui est arrivé dans ce pays jusqu'à son retour en Espagne, ecrite brièvement et diverssante à lire, 1837
- Voyages, relations et mémoires originaux pour servir a l'histoire de la découverte de l'Amérique (10 vols., 1836-'8; 2d series, 10 vols., 1839–40)
- Archives des voyages, ou collection d'anciennes relations inédites (2 vols., 1840–41)
- Recueil de documents et mémoires originaux sur l'histoire des possessions espagnoles dans l'Amérique à diverses époques de la conquête, 1840 Texte en ligne
- De la position des Anglais aux Indes, et de l'expédition contre la Chine, 1840 Texte en ligne
- Essai sur la théogonie Mexicaine (1840)
- Histoire du Mexique par Don Alvaro Tezozomac (2 vols., 1849)
- Essai sur l'ancien Cundinamarca (1862)
- Notice historique sur la Guyane Française (1863)
