= Bartholomeus Welser VI =

Bartholomeus Welser VI or the younger (26 October 1512 – c. 17 May 1546) was a member of the Welser banking family, which had acquired the colonial rights to Venezuela Province in 1528 and created Klein-Venedig. (Note: The German translation of the Spanish 'Venezuela', "little Venice".) He was the son of Bartholomeus Welser V (the elder).

In 1540, he journeyed to Venezuela to join an expedition by Governor Georg von Speyer. Finding Speyer dead on his arrival, he joined the new governor, Philipp von Hutten, in exploring Venezuela.

The Welsers' claim to Venezuela was disputed by various Spanish figures, and Juan de Carvajal falsified papers to install himself as governor of the colony. After exploring the country to find El Dorado, the Welser party returned to their capital Neu-Augsburg in April 1546 and found it under Spanish control.

Carvajal was said to have taken control after assuming Hutten and the other Germans, who had been gone for six years, had all died, but he was not willing to hand back control of the territory. A fight ensued, with Carvajal being seriously wounded by Welser VI.

That caused Hutten and Welser VI to be captured by Carvajal as the Germans were fleeing to the port at Coro, being held in chains for some time, and to be beheaded on Good Friday that year. German retelling of the beheading "describe their sacrifice as the legitimization of the German possession of Venezuela", martyring them and noting that German blood was literally running through Venezuela.
