= Welser family =

German banking and merchant family

Coat of arms of Welser family

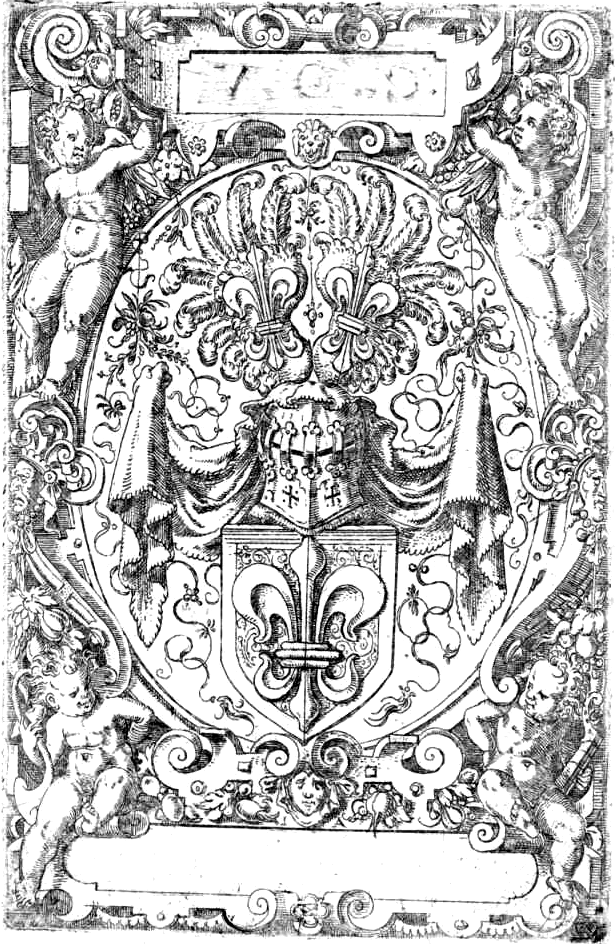
16th-century woodcut of the Welser coat of arms by Jost Amman

The Welser family was a noble German family of bankers and merchants active between the 14th and 19th centuries. Originally patricians based in Augsburg and Nuremberg, its members rose to great prominence in international high finance in the 16th century as bankers to the Habsburgs and financiers of Charles V, Holy Roman Emperor. Along with the Fugger family, the Welser family controlled large sectors of the European economy, and accumulated enormous wealth through trade and the German colonization of the Americas, including the slave trade. The family received colonial rights of the Province of Venezuela from Charles V, who was also King of Spain, in 1528, becoming owners and rulers of the South American colony of Klein-Venedig (within modern Venezuela), but were deprived of their rule in 1546. Philippine Welser (1527–1580), "renowned for her learning and beauty", was married to Archduke Ferdinand, Emperor Ferdinand I's son.

Claiming descent from the Byzantine general Belisarius, the family is known since the 13th century. By the early Age of Discovery, the Welser family had established trading posts in Antwerp, Lyon, Madrid, Nuremberg, Sevilla, Lisbon, Venice, Rome, and Santo Domingo. The Welsers financed not only the Emperor, but also other European monarchs. After the Reformation, both Welser and Fugger families remained in the Roman Catholic Church.

The Augsburg main line became extinct in 1797, followed by the Nuremberg branch in 1878. The Ulm branch, who became Imperial Barons in 1713, still exists.

== History ==
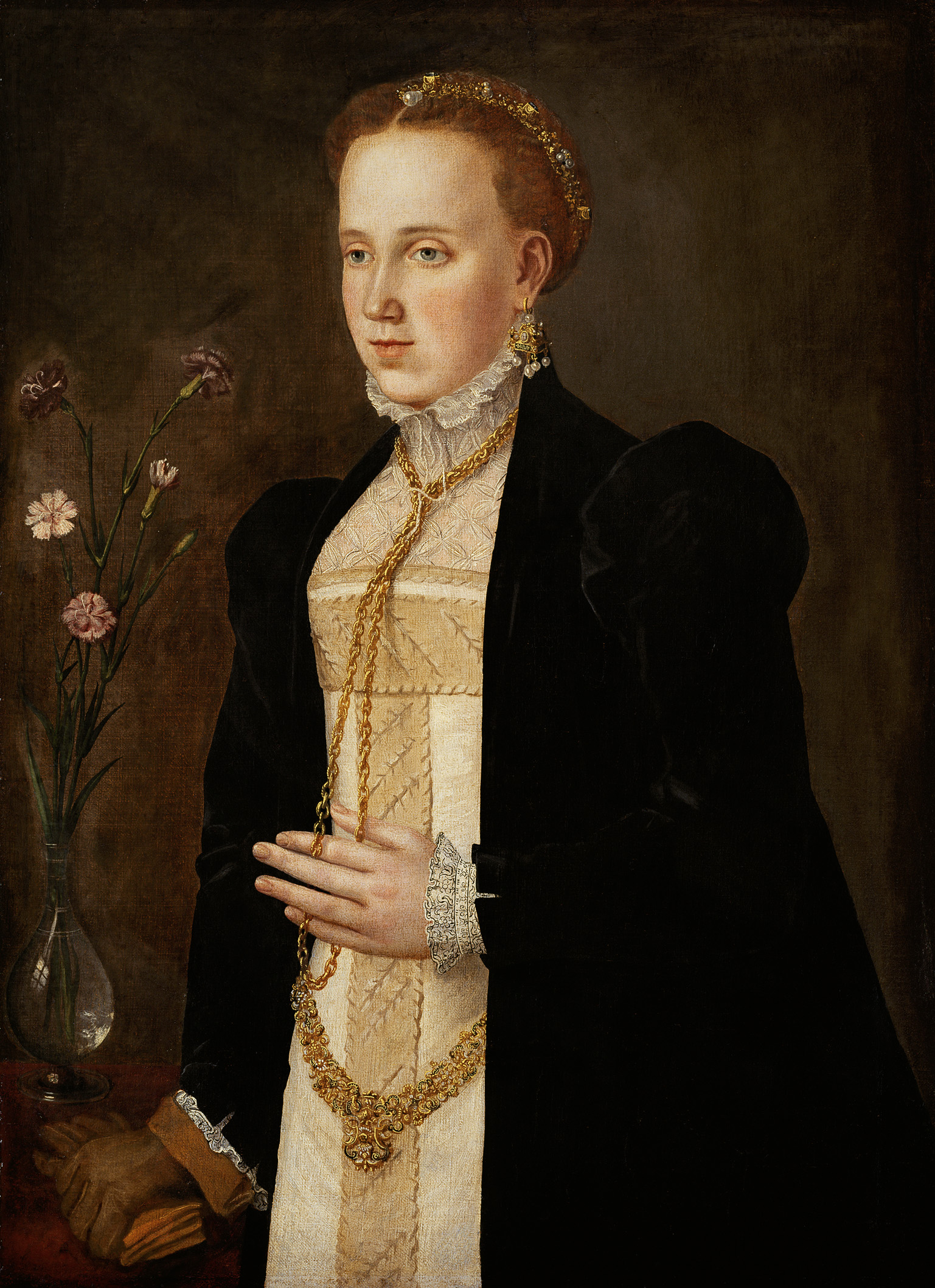
Philippine Welser, wife of Ferdinand II, Archduke of Austria, portrait at Ambras Castle

The history of the family can be traced back to the 13th century, when its members held official positions in the city of Augsburg. Later, the family became widely known as prominent merchants. During the 15th century, when the brothers Bartholomew and Lucas Welser carried on an extensive trade with the Levant and elsewhere, they had branches in the principal trading centres of southern Germany and Italy, and also in Antwerp, London, and Lisbon. In the 15th and 16th centuries, branches of the family settled at Nuremberg and in Austria. They were represented in the inner council by the Dance Statute of Nuremberg.

The business was continued by Antony (died 1518), a son of Lucas Welser. He was one of the first Germans to use the sea route to the East, which had been discovered by Vasco da Gama.

=== Contribution to Colonization in the Americas ===
Contrary to many historiographical depictions, the conquest of the Americas would not have been as successful as it was without the help of many other foreign actors, such as the Welser Family. Historian Julia Roth claims that a "relational perspective" on the Welser Family's contributions to the colonization of the Americas explains how the Welsers have continued to be an example for other "German colonial endeavors and fantasies."

The Welser Family saw its chance to participate in the conquest of the Americas in the early to mid-1500s. In the Contract of Madrid (1528), King Charles V provided the Welsers with privileges within the African slave trade and conquests of the Americas as a reward for their financial contributions to his election in 1519. By March 1528, they were also granted the province of Venezuela.

The Welser merchants also contributed to the mining industry in Cuba, as they discovered copper there. German traders (Welsers and Fuggers) contributed to the importation of German products to Cuba, such as equipment for mining and building railways. Historians Álvarez Estévez and Guzmàn Pascual argue that the Welser and Fugger contributions in Cuba led to the island's "first contact with international finance capital," and that these interrelations opened Cuban trade up to the "financial powers of the world."

=== The Venezuela purchase ===
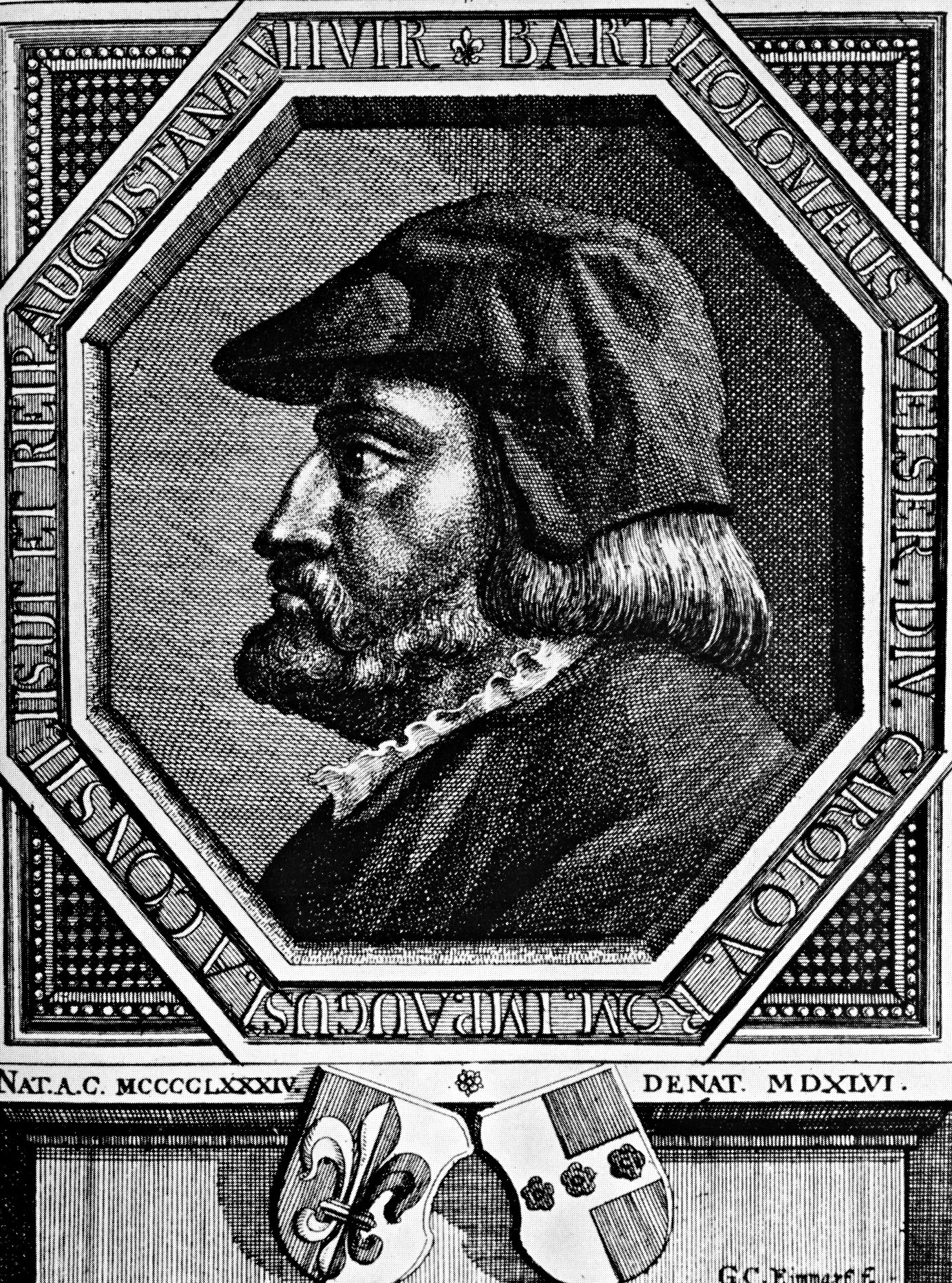
Bartholomeus Welser V, engraving by Georg Christoph Eimmart

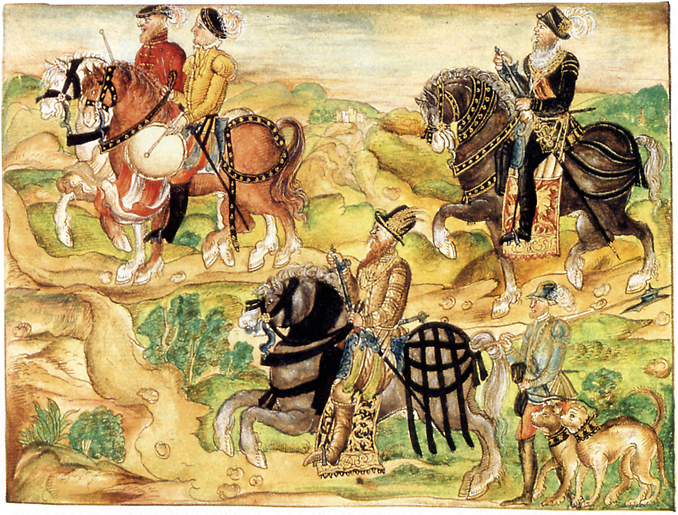
The Welser Armada exploring the Welser's colony Klein-Venedig (the Province of Venezuela)

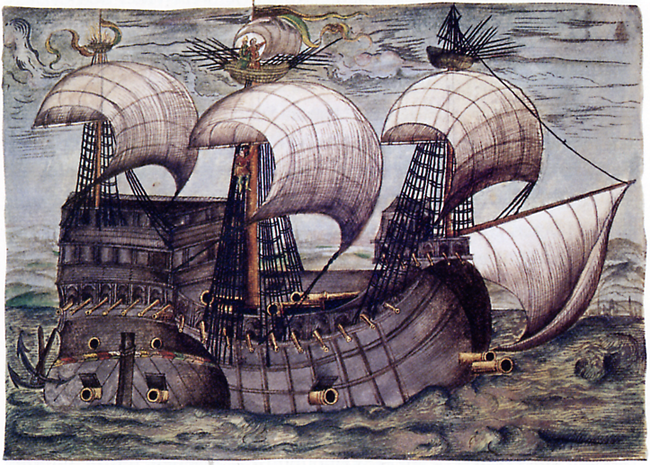
The galleon La Santa Trinidad, a ship that formed part of the expedition to Venezuela on behalf of the Welser family

Bartholomeus Welser V lent the Emperor Charles V a great sum of money for which, in 1528, he received as security the Province of Venezuela, developing it as Klein-Venedig (little Venice), but in consequence of their rapacious acts, the Welsers were deprived of their rule before the Emperor's reign was over. His son, Bartholomeus Welser VI, explored Venezuela along with Philipp von Hutten and both were executed at El Tocuyo by local Spanish Governor Juan de Carvajal in 1546.

From 1528 to 1556, seven entradas (expeditions) led to the plunder and exploitation of local civilizations, but these colonial foundations led to future trade within the Americas. The first governors of Venezuela, Ambrosius Alfinger (1529–1533), Nicolas Federmann, and Georg von Speyer captured and enslaved local indigenous people after their failed attempts to find gold on the Venezuelan coast. The Welsers contributed to the establishment of cities such as Coro, Maracaibo, and Bogotá.

=== Caribbean slave trade ===
The Welsers' hold of the slave trade in the Caribbean began in 1523, as they had begun their own sugar production in Santo Domingo. According to historian Julia Roth, "In 1532, the company purchased the sugar mill Santa Bàrbara in the department of San Juan de la Maguana through the Welsers' overseas agent Sebastian Renz from Ulm for the price of 3427 Pesos, 202 Arrobas sugar, and 4 slaves." Over the next 15 years, thousands of enslaved Africans were transported to the Americas.

=== Habsburg marriage ===
Bartholomäus's niece, Philippine (1527–80), daughter of Franz Welser, was renowned for her learning and beauty. She secretly married the Archduke Ferdinand, second son of the Emperor Ferdinand I. She was given the titles Baroness of Zinnenburg, Margravine of Burgau, Landgravine of Nellenburg, and Countess of Oberhohenberg and Niederhohenberg. Their children were debarred from inheriting their father's rank as Archdukes of Austria; their son Margrave Andrew of Burgau became a cardinal and Charles, Margrave of Burgau became a noted general.

=== Other members ===
Another member of the Welser family, Markus Welser (1558–1614), was famed for his learning. He was a humanist, historian, publisher, and (from 1611) mayor of Augsburg.

Carl Wilhelm Welser von Neunhof (1663–1711) was a mayor of Nuremberg.

=== Branches and nobility ===
Bartholomeus Welser V was ennobled by the Emperor in 1532. The Augsburg main line became extinct in 1797, the Nuremberg branch in 1878. The Ulm branch, who became Imperial Barons in 1713, still exists.

== Legacy ==
The Welsersche Familienstiftung (in English, the "Welser Family Foundation"), founded on 1 April 1539, still exists and has owned numerous castles in Germany. Following the extinction of the more senior lines of the family, the Ulm branch became administrators of the foundation.

In Augsburg there is the Fugger and Welser Adventure Museum that exhibits Welser and Fugger history.
