= Philipp von Hutten =

German explorer

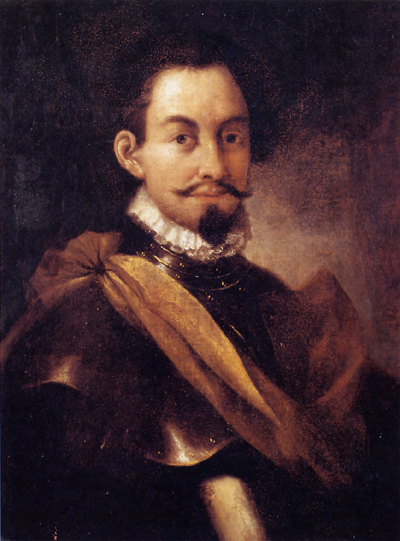
Philipp von Hutten. Portrait by an unknown artist (posthumously, c. 1600)

Philipp von Hutten (18 December 1505 – 17 May 1546) was a German adventurer and an early European explorer and conquistador of Venezuela. He is a significant figure in the history of Klein-Venedig (1528 - 1546), the concession of Venezuela Province to the Welser banking family by Charles V, Holy Roman Emperor and King of Spain.

== Biography ==
Hutten was born in Königshofen, Lower Franconia. He passed some of his early years at the court of the Holy Roman emperor Charles V. Charles granted the province of Venezuela (or Venosala as Hutten calls it), to the Welser family of Augsburg.

=== Early exploration of Venezuela, 1535-1538 ===
Hutten joined a band of 600 adventurers, under Georg von Speyer, who sailed out to conquer and exploit the province in the family's interest. The party landed at Coro in February 1535 and Hutten accompanied von Speyer on his long and difficult expedition into the interior in search of treasure (El Dorado). Subsequently, Hutten accompanied Speyer on a journey (1536–38) in which they reached the headwaters of the Japurá River, near the equator.

=== Journey to Los Llanos, 1541-1546 ===
After the death of von Speyer in June, 1540, Hutten became governor (captain-general) of Venezuela in December. He left Coro on 1 August, 1541 with a force of about 150 men, mostly horsemen. He initially followed the path of Speyer, but crossed the Rio Bermejo, and went on with a small group of around 40 men on horseback into the Llanos. There he engaged in battle with a large number of Omaguas and was severely wounded.

=== Capture and execution ===
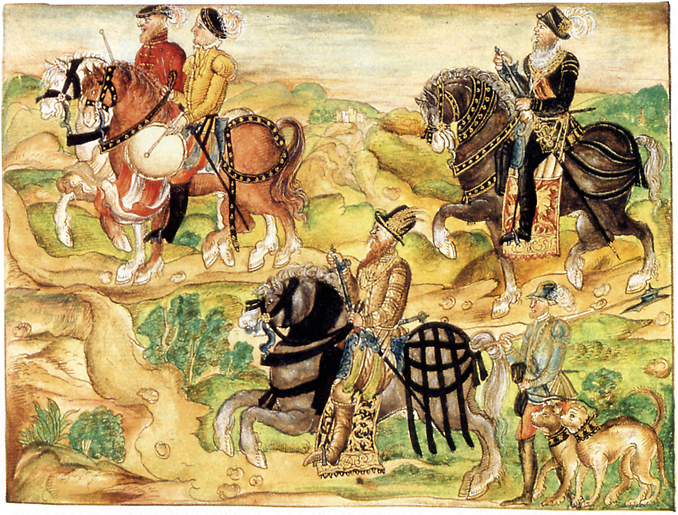
Inspection of the Welser army by Georg von Speyer (right) and von Hutten (center) at Sanlúcar de Barrameda.

In autumn 1544, weakened by hunger and fever, he and his followers who survived returned to Coro. About 100 miles away from the city, he was captured and killed just before Easter 1546 by the Spaniard Juan de Carvajal. Carvajal had in 1545 been appointed Captain-General of Venezuela by the Audiencia of Santo Domingo and feared the loss of his position upon Hutten's return.

As the years had gone by with no news of Hutten and his followers, Carvajal had begun to feel secure in his position, and the return of the adventurers was not welcome to him. When he saw how few they were, he thought to force from them an acknowledgment of his authority. He was unsuccessful, and a subsequent attempt to seize them proved disastrous, for he was wounded by a traveling companion of Hutten's, Bartholomeus VI. Welser (the younger).

Carvajal was forced to pledge the Germans safe passage. In their journey to the coast, the adventurers took no precautions against attack, and were easily captured by Carvajal in April 1546, who, after keeping Hutten and Welser in chains for a time, had them beheaded. Eight years after Hutten's death, the Welsers' grant was taken from them, and German rule in Venezuela ceased.

== Works ==
Hutten left some letters, and also a narrative of the earlier part (1535 to 1546) of his adventures. The manuscript was brought to Germany, and lay so long in a library that it became almost illegible. It was finally published in the first volume of a collection entitled Literary and Historical Magazine by Meusel (Bayreuth and Leipzig, 1785). It bears the title "News from the Indies from Junker Philipp Hutten" (German: Zeitung aus India Junkher Philipps von Hutten) and contains information on the events in which the author took part while giving graphic descriptions of the countries through which he passed.

== Family ==
He was a relative of Ulrich von Hutten.

== Literary allusions ==
In 1983, Venezuelan author Francisco Herrera-Luque (1927–1991) published the novel La Luna de Fausto (Faust's Moon) narrating the adventures of von Hutten (called Felipe de Utre in old Spanish accounts) in a journey from Europe to wild American territories in the 16th century, until beheaded by Juan de Carvajal over a power dispute. According to the legend, his death was prophesied by Dr. Faust himself, who foretold he was going to die under a "red moon".
