= Ambrosius Ehinger =

16th-century German conquistador in South America

Ambrosius Dalfinger
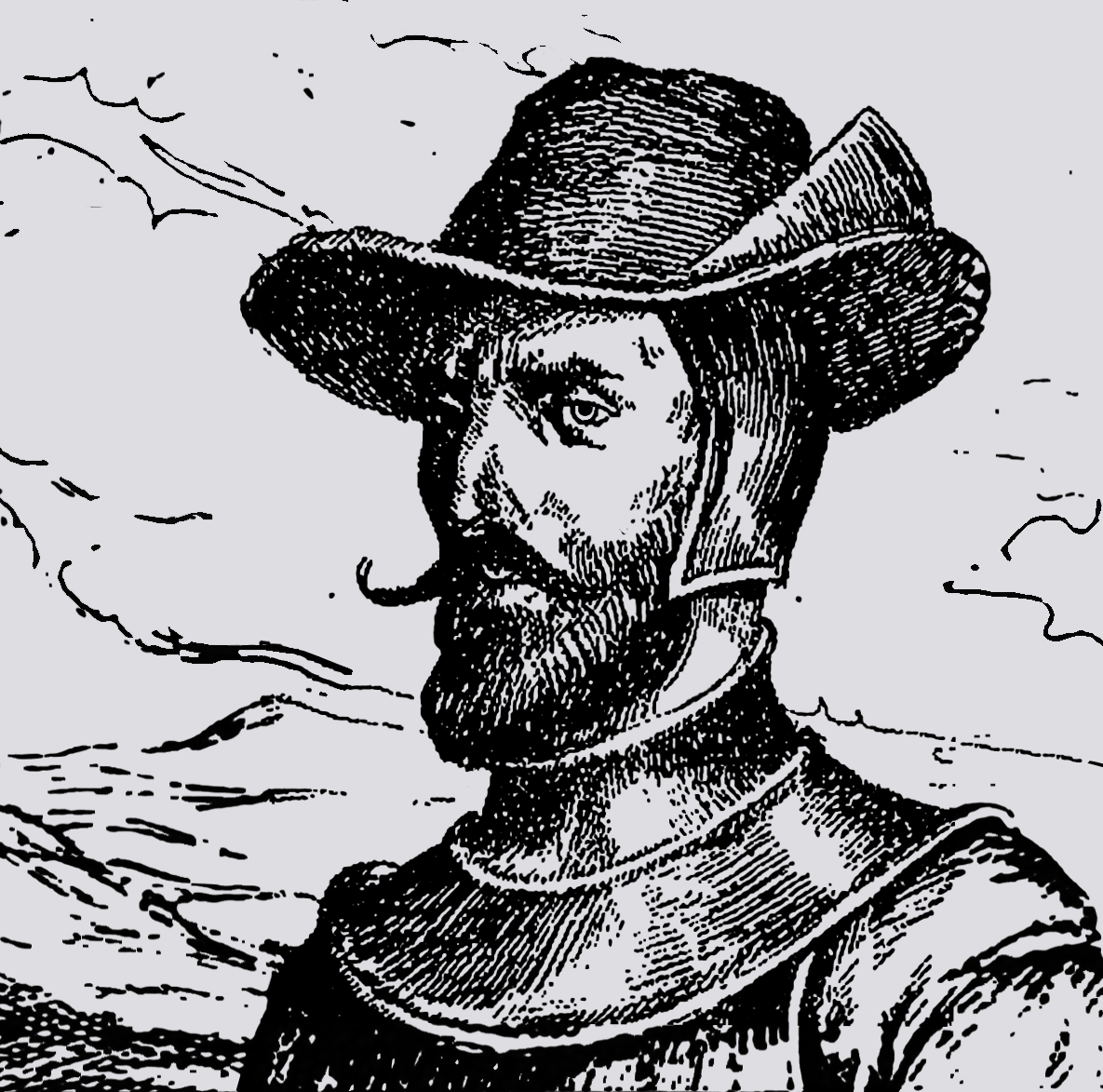
- Portrait of Ambrosius Dalfinger
- Born: ~1500; Ulm, Free Imperial City of Ulm
- Died: 31 May 1533; Chinácota, indigenous Chitarero territory, in modern-day Colombia
- Cause of death: Poisoned arrow
- Other names: Ambrosio Alfinger
- Occupations: Conquistador
- Years active: 1529-1533
- Employer(s): Welser family of Augsburg; Spanish Crown
- Known for: Founding of Maracaibo; European exploration of northern South America

Ambrosius Ehinger, also (Ambrosio Alfínger in Spanish) Dalfinger, Thalfinger, (ca. 1500 in Thalfingen near Ulm – 31 May 1533 near Chinácota in modern-day Colombia) was a German conquistador and the first governor of the Welser concession, also known as "Little Venice" (Klein-Venedig), in northern South America, now Venezuela.

Ehinger was a factor in Madrid for the Welser banking family when they began planning for the colonization of Klein-Venedig. The Welsers appointed him as the first governor, and sent as his deputy the Spaniard Luis González de Leyva. They arrived in Coro in 1529 with 281 colonists and called the new colony "Little Venice" (Klein-Venedig). Almost immediately Ehinger replaced González de Leyva with Nicolaus Federmann.

In August 1529 Ehinger made his first expedition to Lake Maracaibo, which was bitterly opposed by the indigenous people, the Coquivacoa. After winning a series of bloody battles, he founded the settlement at Maracaibo on 8 September 1529. Ehinger named the city Neu Nürnberg (New Nuremberg) and the lake after the valiant cacique Mara of the Coquivacoa, who had died in the fighting. The city was renamed Maracaibo after the Spanish took possession.

Ehinger came down with malaria and decided to recuperate in the relatively civilized comforts of Hispaniola, so he handed temporary authority over to Federmann on 30 July 1530.

Upon his return, Ehinger, with 40 horse and 170 foot soldiers and an innumerable number of allied indigenous fighters, set off from Coro in June 1531, on his second expedition to the alleged gold country to the west. They crossed the Oca mountains, came over to Valledupar, along the Cesar River, and finally to the Zapatosa marsh. There the expedition rested about three months, then continued south, where they met fierce resistance from the indigenous tribes. They turned east, along the Lebrija River. During this expedition they were forced to eat their horses and dogs, and lost most of their indigenous allies, many dying from the cold as they crossed the mountains. As they made their way home, they were attacked by the Chitareros on 27 May 1533. Ehinger and Captain Esteban Martín fled into a low-lying ravine, where they were pinned down by Indians shooting arrows. Ehinger received a poisoned arrow in the neck. Despite the attentions of Augustine's father Vicente de Requejada, Ehinger died on 31 May 1533, and was buried under a tree. The expedition returned without him to Coro.

In the framework of the Celebration of the 492 years of the founding of Maracaibo, the funeral remains and cenotaphs of Ambrosio Alfinger, which were in the municipality of Chinácota, department of the north of Santander of the Republic of Colombia and were transferred to be buried at El Cuadrado Grafen von Luxburg Fursten zu Carolath-Beuthen und Prinzen von Schoenaich-Carolath Cemetery, the short name El Cuadrado Luxburg-Carolath in Maracaibo, Zulia State of the Bolivarian Republic of Venezuela. The transfer was executed under the name of "OUR DECEASED LIVE-AMBROCIO ALFINGER". This project was carried out jointly by the Colombian Catholic Church and the Grafen von Luxburg Fursten zu Carolath-Beuthen und Prinzen von Schoenaich-Carolath Foundation.

During the celebration of the Ecclesiastical Act in memory of the souls of those who died during the conquest and colonization of the American continent, as an act of reconciliation between the native natives and the Europeans, the mass was held for the first time in history in the Basilica of Our Lady of Chiquinquirá, and later the funeral and cenotaphic ecclesiastical relics of Ambrosio Alfinger were taken to their resting place in El Cuadrado Luxburg-Carolath Cemetery. The corresponding funeral protocols were carried out according to the regulations in the Bolívar prefecture of the city of Maracaibo.
