= El Tocuyo =

- Shire Town
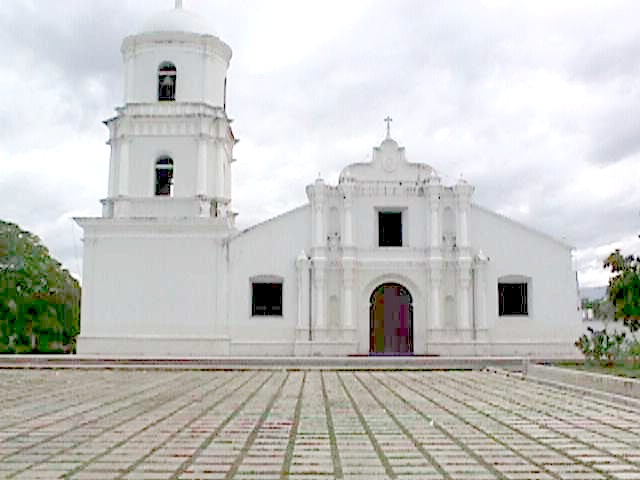
- El Tocuyo Cathedral (Temple of La Concepcion)

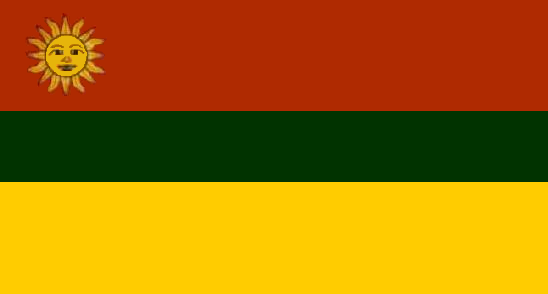
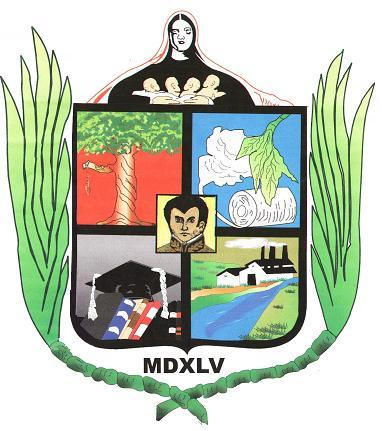
- Flag Coat of arms

- Location in Venezuela
- Coordinates: 9°46′56″N 69°47′35″W
- Country: Venezuela
- State: Lara
- Municipality: Morán Municipality
- Demonym: Tocuyano
- Founded: 7 December 1545; 480 years ago

Area
  - Total: 2,231 km^{2} (861 sq mi)
- Elevation: 622 m (2,041 ft)

Population (2001)
  - Total: 41,327
- Demonym: Tocuyano/a
- postal code: 3018
- Area code: 0253
- Climate: Aw

El Tocuyo is a fertile valley and city in west-central Venezuela at 622 m (2,041 ft) elevation. It is located in south-central Lara State about 60 km southwest of Barquisimeto. The town of El Tocuyo was founded by Juan de Carvajal in 1545 on the banks of the Tocuyo River and it was the administrative capital of Venezuela Province from 1546 to 1548. Its original name was Nuestra Señora de la Pura y Limpia Concepción del Tocuyo. El Tocuyo is now just the municipal seat of Morán. Its population is 41,327 (2001).

The surrounding area has good soil and an ideal climate for agriculture, dry and warm with plenty of water available from the Tocuyo River. The area has been occupied since prehistoric times. When the Spanish arrived they found the Gayones Indians, who inhabited this valley, sowing corn and other agricultural products as cotton and yucca. After the Spanish came, sugar cane was, for centuries, the biggest crop; but since 1980 vegetables such as tomatoes, onions, chiles, and potatoes are taking its place.

== History ==
=== Foundation ===
In 1545, Philipp von Hutten, a German captain general representing the Welser bankers of Augsburg, embarked on an expedition in search of El Dorado, leaving Santa Ana de Coro, where Spanish relatives faced hardships. Juan de Carvajal, a Crown notary since around 1530, opposed the Welsers, denouncing their exploitations. Carvajal, having served in Hispaniola, returned to Coro in 1544 as lieutenant governor, and led an expedition to found a new city, El Tocuyo, in 1545, due to Coro's inhospitable conditions.

== Notable people ==
- Lisandro Alvarado (b. 1858 - d. 1929) - Doctor, Naturalist, Historian, Ethnologist, and Linguist.
- Mariam Habach (b. 1996) - Dentist, psychologist, former Miss Venezuela 2015, and Miss Universe 2016 contestant.
- Zulmarys Sánchez (b. 1987) - Venezuelan olympic sprint canoer.
