= Venezuela Province =

Region within Venezuela proper

Province of Caracas Provincia de Caracas (Spanish)
- 1527–1864
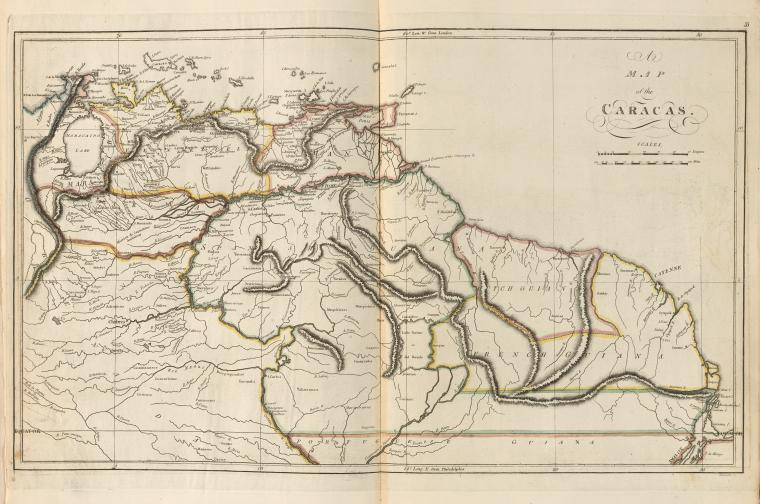
- Provincia de Venezuela y las Guayanas
- Status: Province of the Spanish Empire
- Capital: Santa Ana de Coro (1527–1546); El Tocuyo (1546–1577); Caracas (from 1577)
- Common languages: Spanish
- Religion: Roman Catholicism; Lutheran Protestant envoys sent on behalf of the Welser family (1528–1546)
- Government: Monarchy (before 1811); Republic (after 1811)
- King (before 1811) President (after 1811)
- Historical era: Spanish colonization
  - Royal decree: 1527
  - Concession to the Welser family (Klein-Venedig): 1528
  - Concession revoked, end of Klein-Venedig: 1546
  - Viceroyalty of New Granada: 1717
  - Captaincy General of Venezuela: 1777
  - Dissolved after Federal War: 1864
- Currency: Spanish colonial real
Preceded by
New Spain
Viceroyalty of New Granada
Succeeded by
Captaincy General of Venezuela
Klein-Venedig
Venezuela
- Today part of: Venezuela

The Venezuela Province (or Province of Caracas) was a province of the Spanish Empire (from 1527), of Gran Colombia (1824–1830) and later of Venezuela (from 1830), apart from an interlude (1528–1546) when it was contracted as a concession by the King of Spain to the German Welser banking family, as Klein-Venedig.

== Colonial history ==
It has its origins with the 1527 foundation of Santa Ana de Coro by Juan de Ampíes, the province's first governor. Coro was the province's capital until 1546, followed by El Tocuyo (1546-1577). The capital was moved to Caracas in 1577 by Juan de Pimentel. At one time Calabozo (founded 1724) was its capital.

Early on, the province was defined in relation to the Venezuelan coastline (with Margarita Province to the north covering the Isla Margarita region). New Andalusia Province (created 1537) soon provided an eastern boundary, excepting a brief period (1633-1654) when the short-lived New Catalonia Province existed between the Venezuela and New Andalusia Provinces. Guayana Province (created 1585) formed a southern boundary. Matters in the west were more complex and fluid, but the Maracaibo Province (from 1676) formed clearly the largest part until the Barinas Province was split from it in 1786.

For most of its existence the province was subject to the legal and administrative supervision of the Royal Audiencia of Santo Domingo (except for two short periods from 1717 to 1723 and 1739 to 1742). Administrative supervision was transferred to the Viceroyalty of New Granada when this was created in 1717, and in 1777 to the new Captaincy General of Venezuela. Legal supervision by Santo Domingo ended in 1786 when the Royal Audience of Caracas became functional within the new Captaincy General.

== Independence ==
The province was one of the 7 which signed the Venezuelan Declaration of Independence. Towards the end of the Venezuelan War of Independence it was incorporated into Gran Colombia, initially dissolved within the Venezuela Department which represented the entire Captaincy General. In 1824 it was recreated (minus territory lost to the new Carabobo Province) as a reduced Caracas Province within a much smaller Venezuela Department.

With the independence of Venezuela in 1830, the province was one of 11, becoming one of 13 by 1840. In 1848 Aragua Province and Guárico Province were split from Caracas. Following the Federal War, the States of Venezuela were created in 1864, and the province ceased to exist.

Maps of the Province of Venezuela
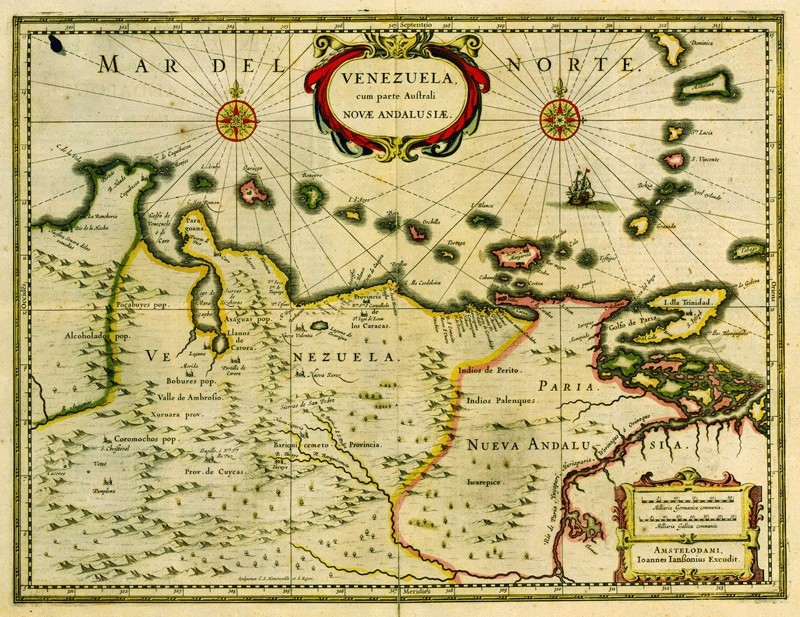
A 1635 map of Venezuela Province and the western part of New Andalusia Province

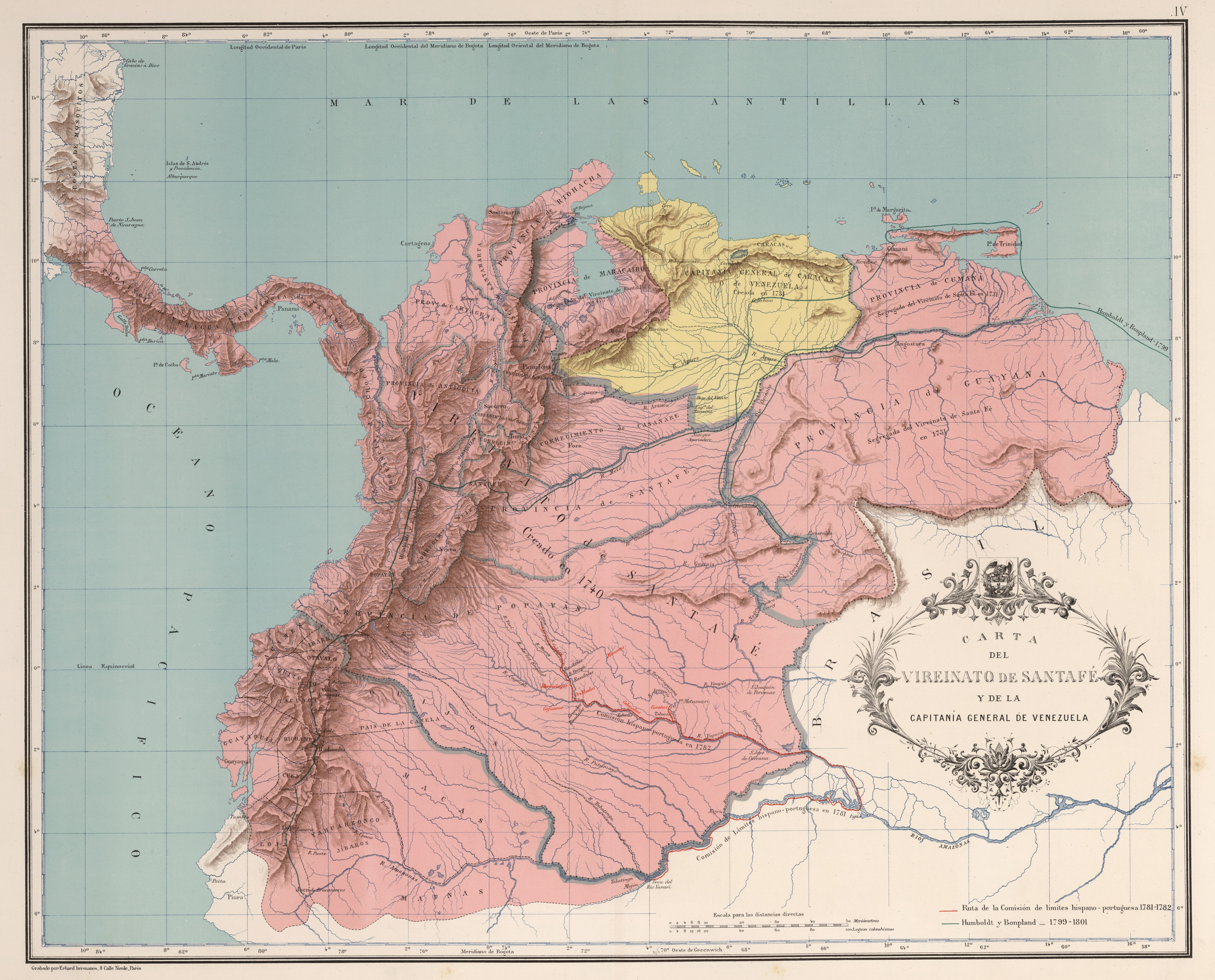
Province of Venezuela (in yellow) within the Viceroyalty of New Granada

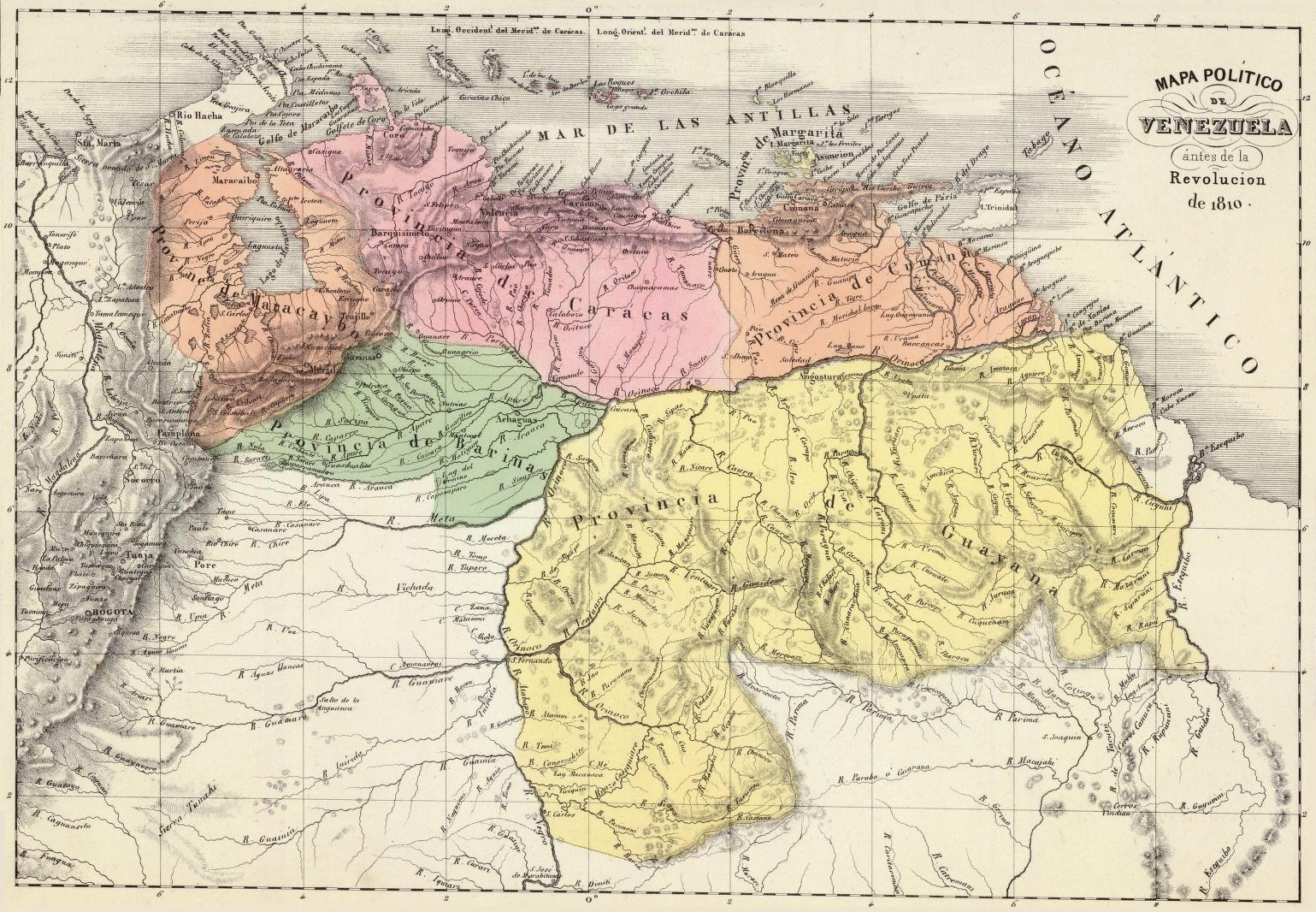
Map of Venezuela in 1810, by Agostino Codazzi, (Provincia de Caracas in pink).

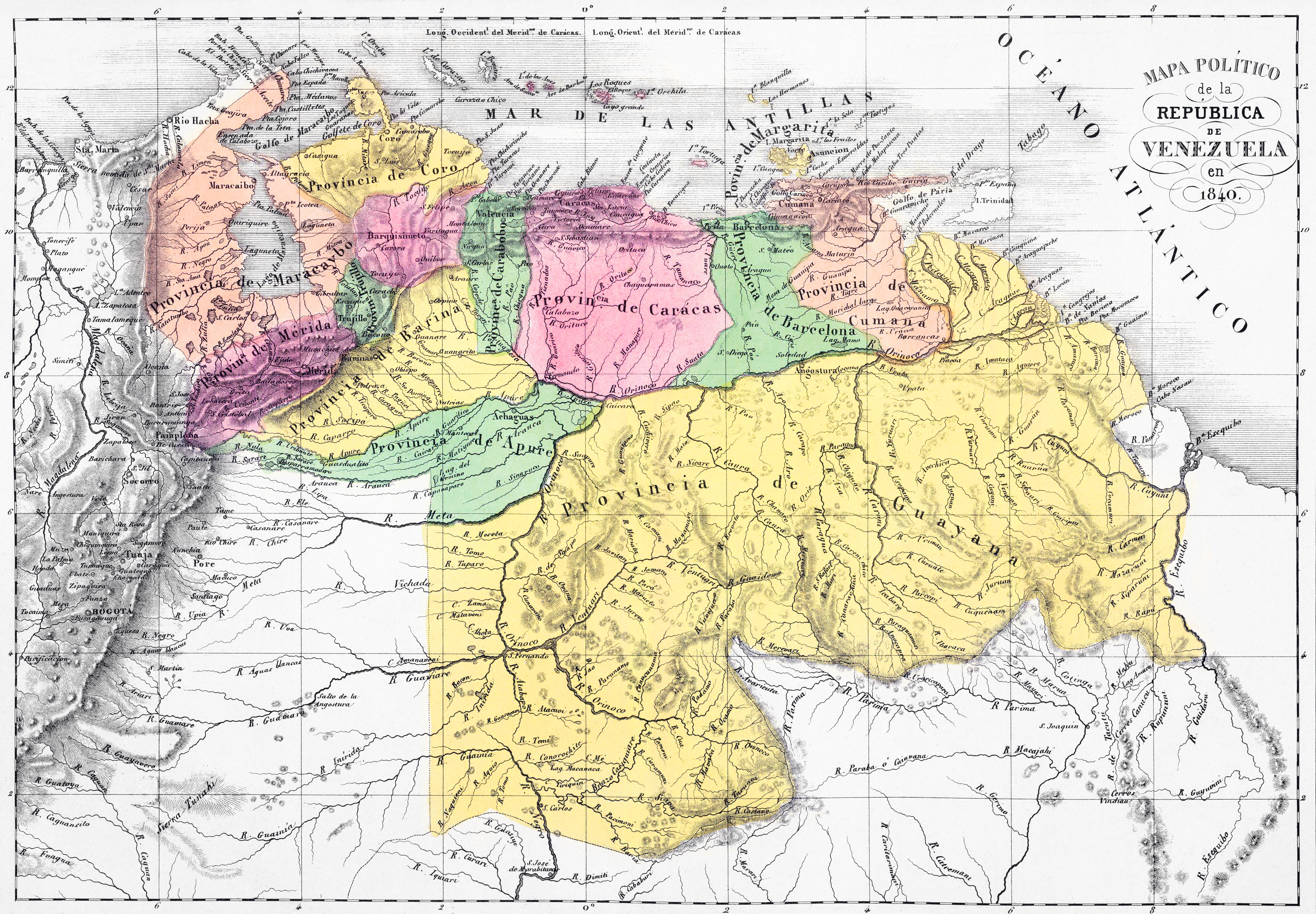
Map of Venezuela in 1840, by Agostino Codazzi, (Provincia de Caracas in pink).

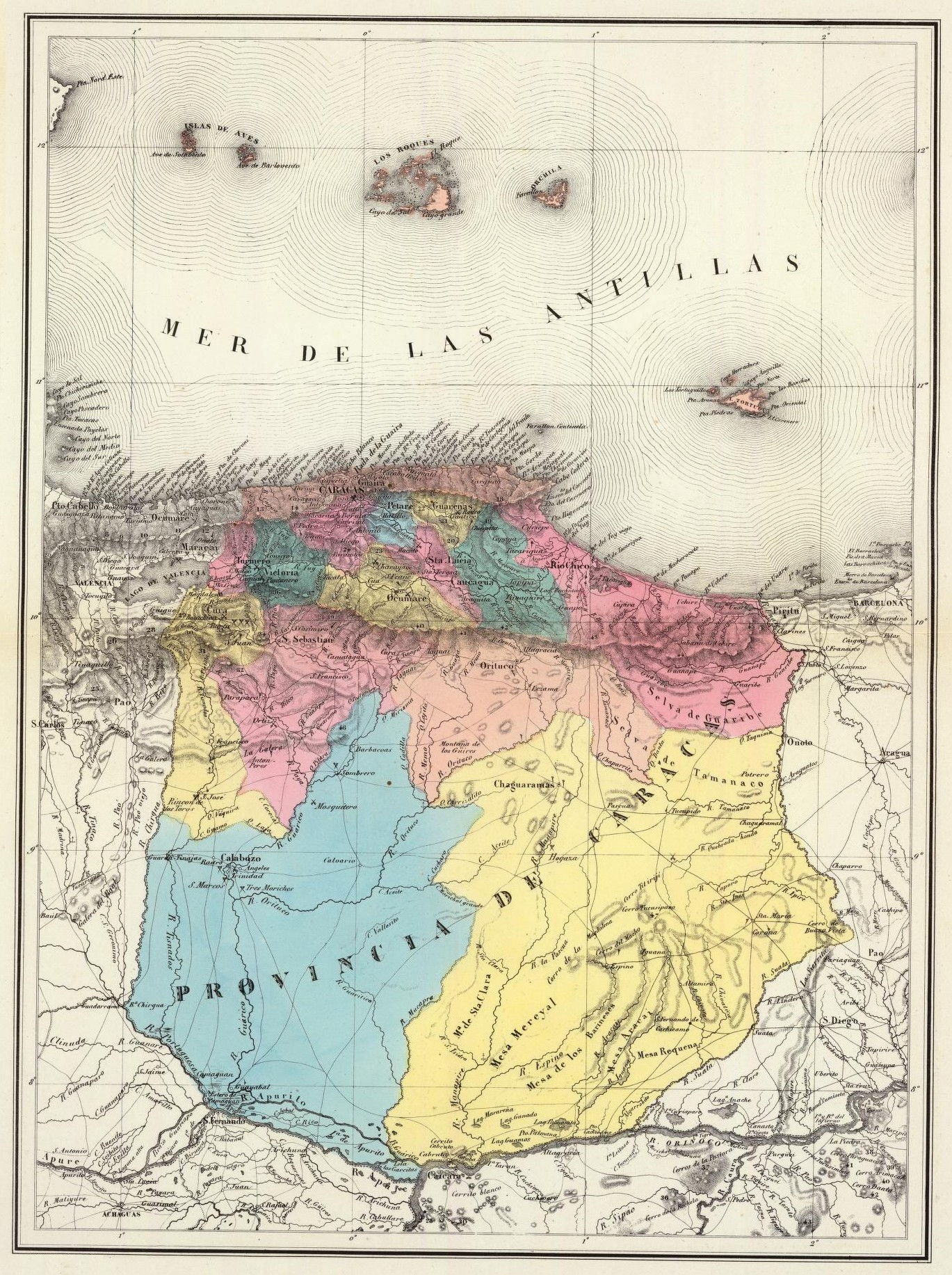
Detailed map of the Caracas Province, 1840.

== See also ==
- List of governors of Venezuela Province
