= Cumanagoto people =

Indigenous people of South America

Cumanagoto
Regions with significant populations
- Venezuela

Languages
- Itoto Majun, Spanish

Related ethnic groups
- Carib, Afro-Caribbeans

The Cumanagoto people are an Indigenous people of South America. Their language belongs to the Carib language family (Gildea 1998). Their territory extended originally over the ancient province of Nueva Andalucía (Cumaná and Barcelona) in eastern Venezuela, and their descendants live now in the north of Anzoátegui State, Venezuela.

The Cumanagotos lived in northeastern Venezuela at the time of the Spanish incursion. Since the 17th century they have not existed as a tribal or governmental unit. The Cumanagoto spoke a Cariban language, related to that of the Palenque. Some even say that the Palenque spoke a dialect of Cumanagoto (Mason 1950). They were agricultural, growing maize, manioc, sweet potatoes, and other native crops, as well as coca trees. They also gathered wild foods, and hunting was important. Domesticated animals were uncommon, except for turkeys. Their villages often had wooden palisades for defense. Dress was minimal, consisting of a small genital covering and decorative ornaments of feathers, pearls, gold, shell, clay beads, coral beads, bones, teeth, or flowers. Polygyny was practiced by chiefs, whose wives lived together in a kind of harem. Religion centered on worship of the sun and moon. The Cumanagotos also valued frogs, as they saw the animal to be the god of waters. Therefore, they did not kill frogs, instead choosing to keep them as pets, but whipping them in the case of an extended winter or little rainfall.

The short-lived Province of New Catalonia (1633-1654), founded by Joan Orpí, was also known as the Province of the Cumanagotos. It was absorbed into New Andalusia Province in 1654.

The name of the city of Cagua in Aragua State is said to derive from the Cumanagoto word for snail, cahigua.

== See also ==
- Carib (disambiguation)
- Cariban languages
