= Joan Orpí =

Spanish conquistador

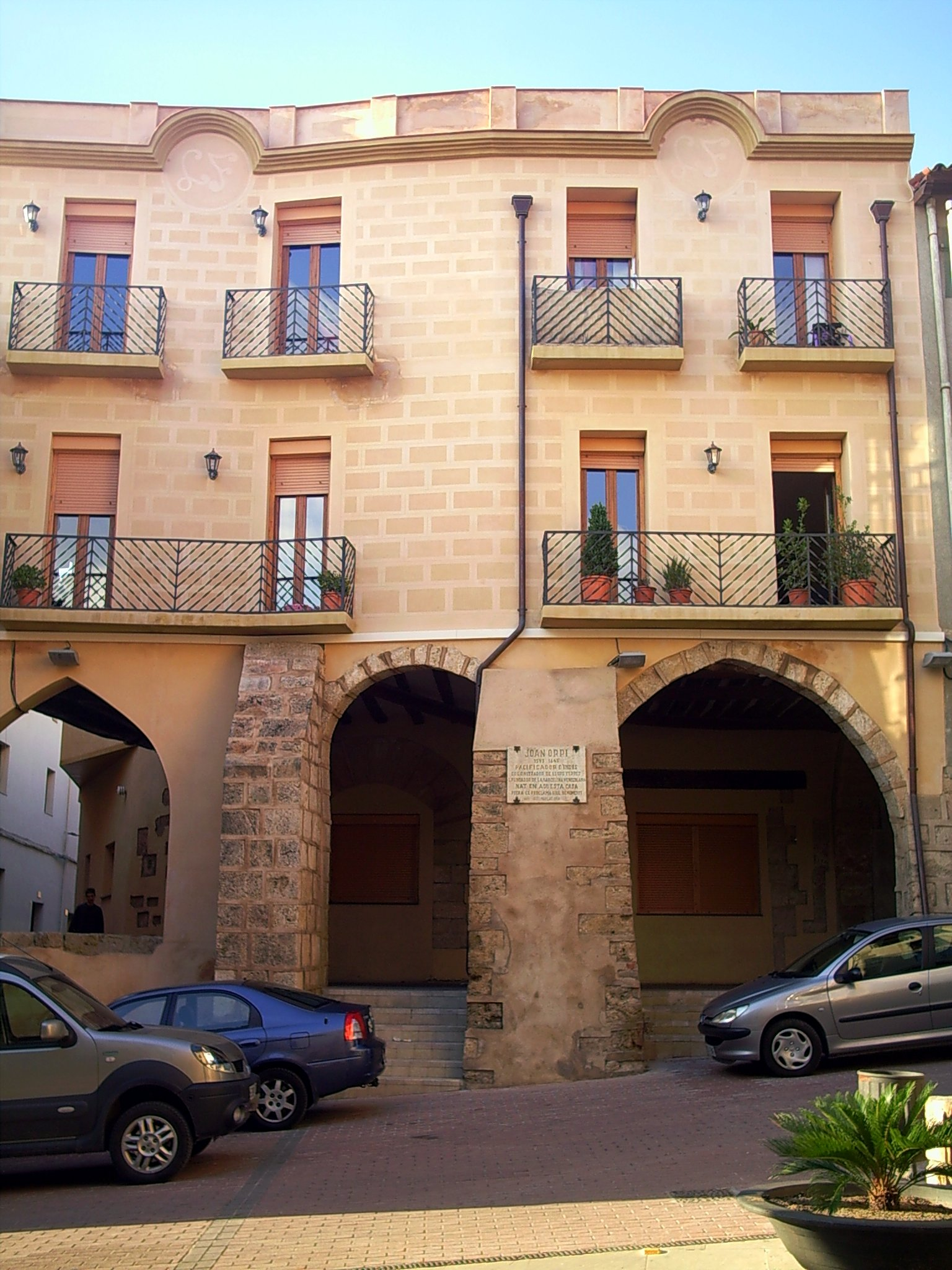
The house Orpí was born in, in Piera.

Joan Orpí i del Pou, also Juan Orpín or Juan Urpín (1593 in Piera – 1 July 1645 in Barcelona, Venezuela) was a Spanish conquistador, known for founding New Barcelona in Venezuela, and for founding the short-lived Province of New Catalonia (1633–1654).

In 1623 he journeyed to Araya. In 1624 the Governor of New Andalusia Province, Diego de Arroyo Daza, named Orpí Lieutenant General of the province, a position he held until 1627/8. That year the Real Audiencia of Santo Domingo recognised the law degree he had obtained in Barcelona, and he began acting as a legal representative of the Audiencia in Caracas.

In 1631 he moved to Santo Domingo, where the difficulty of communication between the Venezuela Province (Caracas) and the New Andalusia Province (Cumaná) was a matter of some concern. He agreed to launch an expedition to secure the territory between the Unare River and the Neverí River, inhabited by the Cumanagotos, and was granted the royal privilege to do so, despite opposition from others. His expedition began in 1632 but had to be called off when the privilege was revoked, and he had to plead a case to the Audiencia and to the Council of the Indies to regain it, which he was able to do in 1636.

A second expedition was launched in 1637, and Orpí founded New Barcelona (Nueva Barcelona del Cerro Santo) in February 1638. New Barcelona became the capital of the Province of Nueva Cataluña he created in 1633, extending along the coast from San Felipe de Austria (Cariaco) to Cabo Codera, and down to the Orinoco River. After his death in 1645 the Province did not last long, being merged into New Andalusia Province in 1654, while New Barcelona had to be refounded in 1671.
