= Islas Borrachas =

Island group in Venezuela

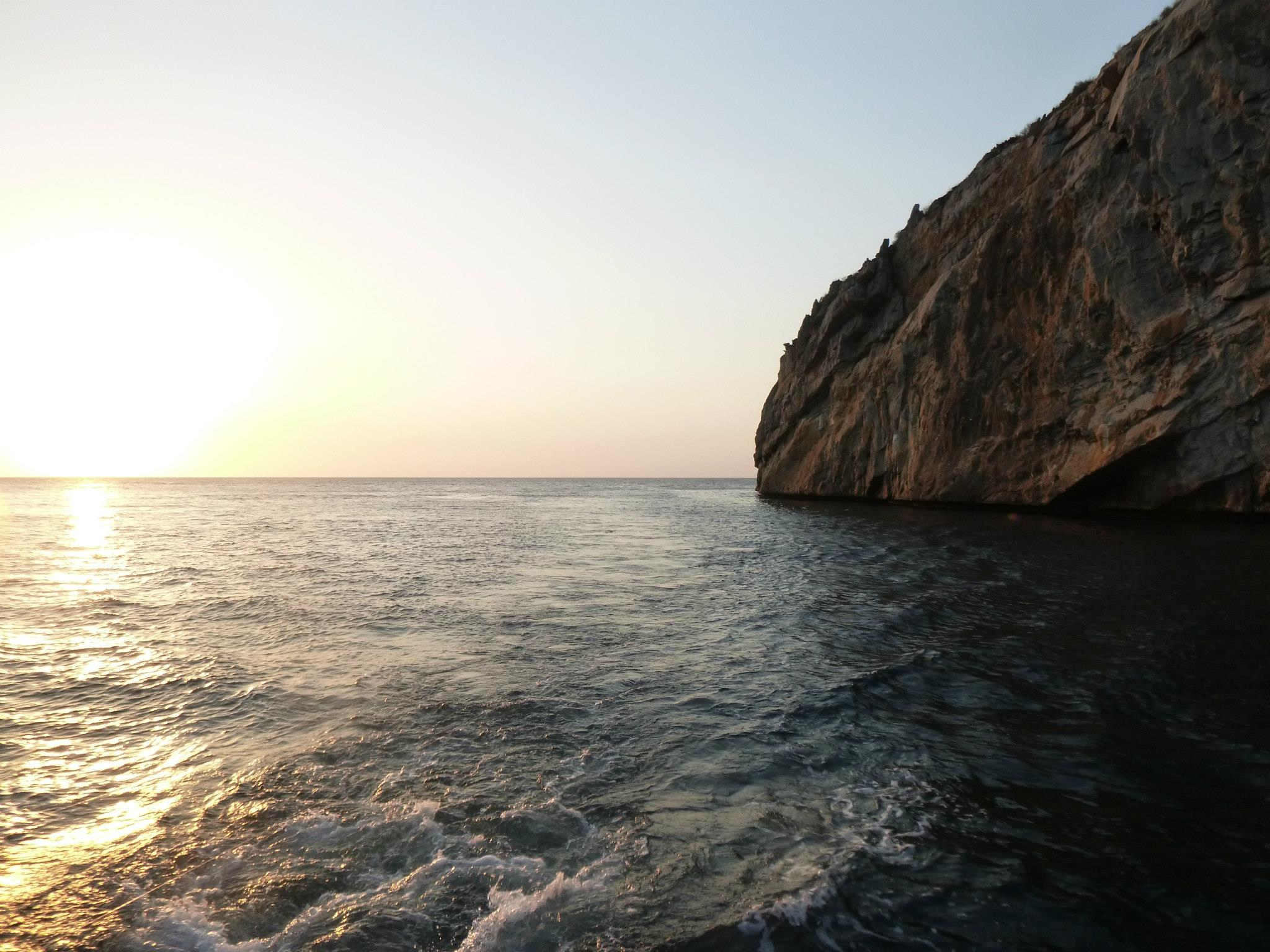
- Borrachas Islands
- Interactive map of Islas Borrachas

Geography
- Location: Caribbean Sea
- Coordinates: 10°15′41″N 64°28′48″W

Administration
- Venezuela
- Anzoátegui

The Islas Borrachas is an archipelago in the Caribbean Sea which consists of three main islands and several islets belonging to Venezuela. They are located north of the Anzoátegui state, west of the Chimanas Islands, and northwest of the city of Puerto la Cruz. Under the 19 December 1973 Decree No. 1534, they belong to the Mochima National Park.

== See also ==
- Geography of Venezuela
