= Barcelona, Venezuela =

Barcelona
- City
- Nueva Barcelona del Cerro Santo
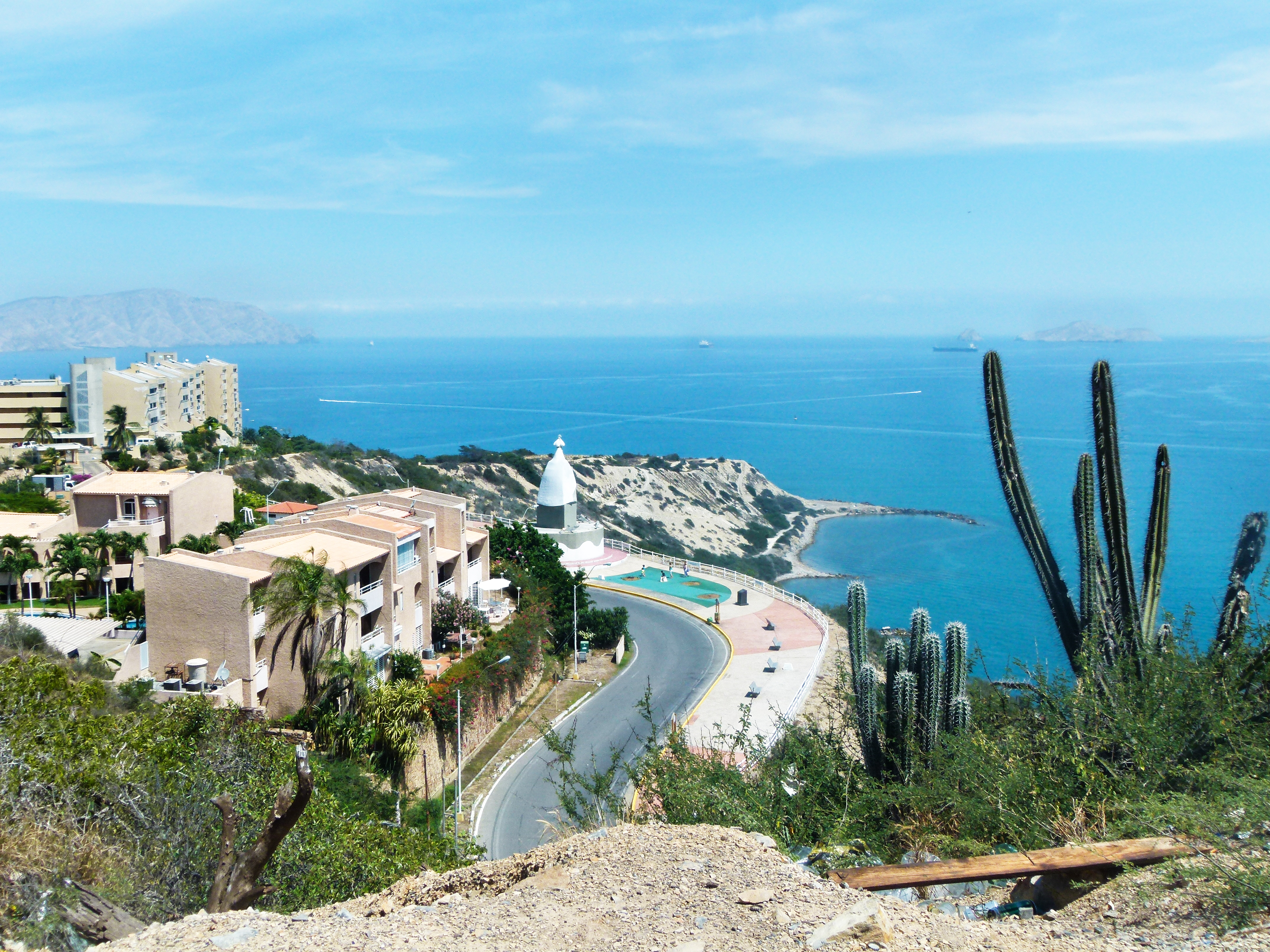
- Panoramic of the city and El Morro hill.

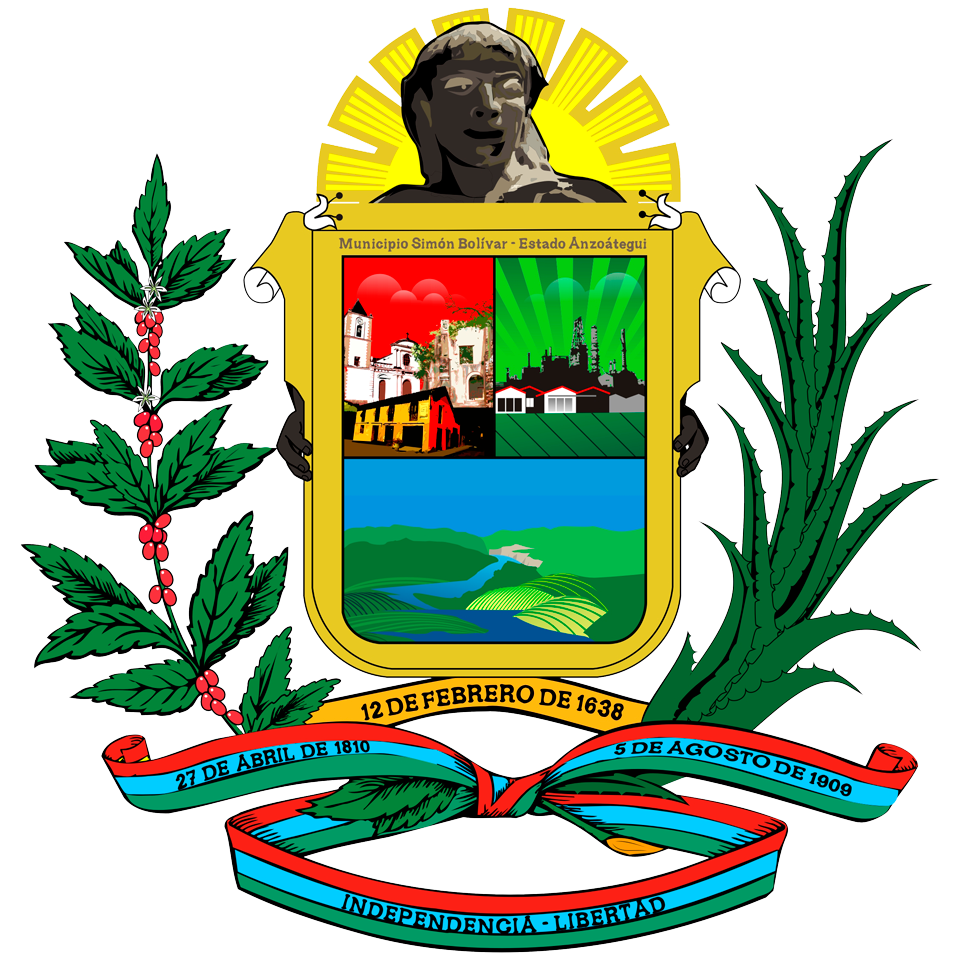
- Flag Coat of arms

- Location within Venezuela Location within the Caribbean Location within South America
- Coordinates: 10°08′25″N 64°41′00″W
- Country: Venezuela
- State: Anzoátegui
- Municipality: Simón Bolívar
- Founded: 1671

Area
  - City: 76.5 km^{2} (29.5 sq mi)
- Elevation: 13 m (43 ft)

Population (2019)
  - City: 454,200
  - Rank: 7th in Venezuela
  - Density: 5,940/km^{2} (15,400/sq mi)
  - Metro: 1,048,776
- Demonym: Barcelonés/a
- Time zone: UTC−4 (VET)
- Postal Code: 6001
- Area code: 0281
- Climate: BSh

Barcelona, originally called Nueva Barcelona, is the capital of Anzoátegui State in Venezuela. Together with Puerto La Cruz, Lechería and Guanta, Barcelona forms Barcelona-Puerto La Cruz with a population of approximately 950,000. It was founded in 1671.

== History ==
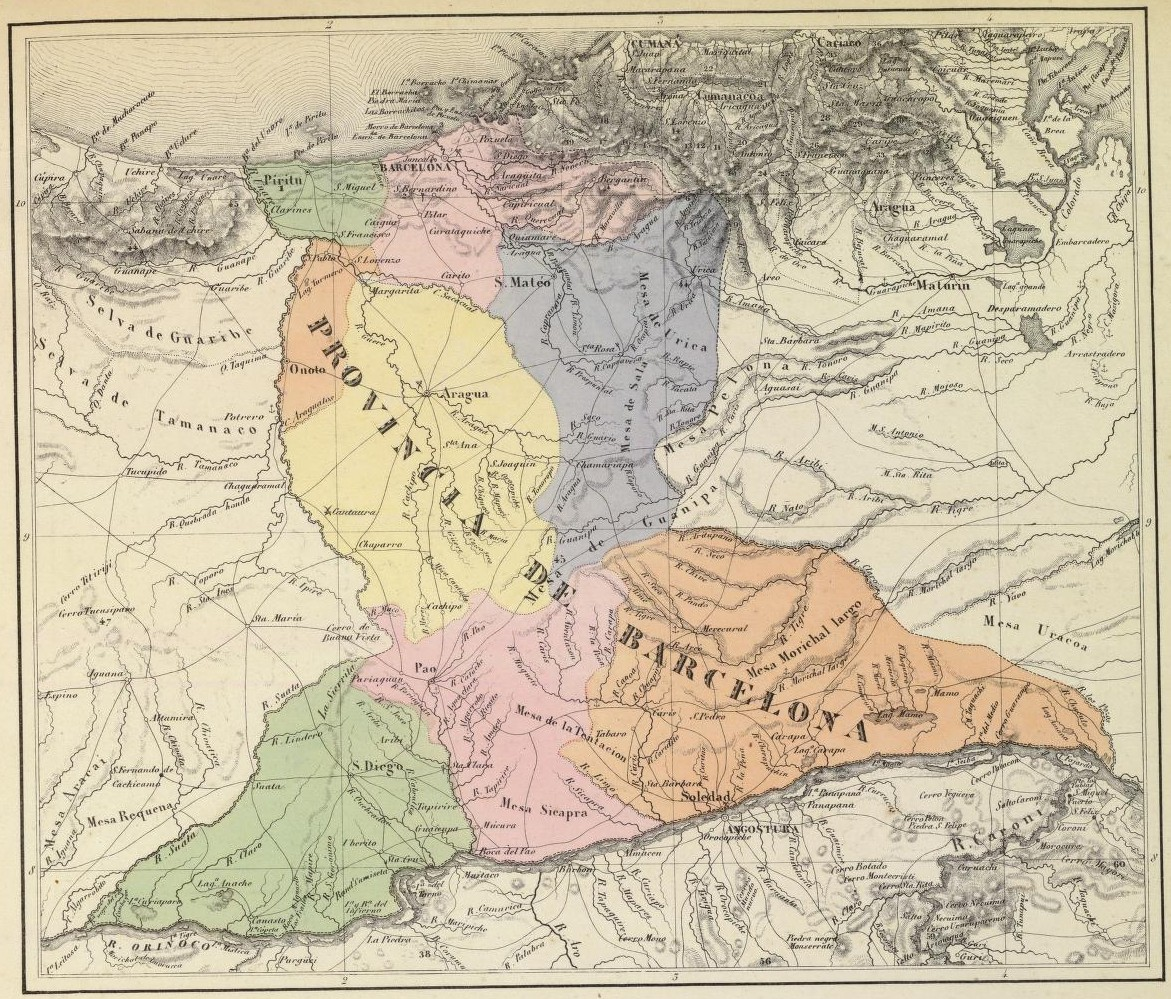
The old Province of Barcelona before it ceased to exist in 1864

=== Spanish colonization ===
Unlike Puerto La Cruz, which was mostly built in the 20th century, Barcelona has a mélange of historical and modern architectures from its many years of growth and development. The settlement of Nueva Barcelona del Cerro Santo (English: New Barcelona of the Holy Mountain), was originally established by the Spanish conquistador Joan Orpí (a native of Piera, Catalonia in Spain) in 1638. It was later re-founded and populated by governor Sancho Fernández de Angulo two kilometres from the original settlement, and by a small community of Catalan colonists around 1671. Barcelona was one of the provinces under the governmental authority of the New Andalusia Province (Nueva Andalusía, or New Andalusia), and referred to commonly as New Barcelona. One of the remaining buildings of this period is the Museo de Anzoátegui, considered the oldest building in the city.

Many of the historical areas of Barcelona centre its main plazas: Bolivar, Miranda and Boyacá. The Plaza Boyacá was the main settlement in Barcelona, and is fronted by the Iglesia El Carmen (English: Carmelite Church) and the city's cathedral, the Catedral de San Cristobal (English: Cathedral of Saint Christopher), built between 1748 and 1773. Today, the cathedral houses the embalmed remains of San Celestino in a glass reliquary in a chapel off the main nave, which dates back to 1744.

By 1761, the territory had been delineated by the population of Pozuelos (to the north), west to the headlands of the River Unare, east to the Guanipa plateau and south to the Orinoco River.

=== Venezuelan independence ===
After forced abdications of the King Ferdinand VII by Napoleon Bonaparte, the Spanish territories in the Americas began to agitate for autonomy. In Venezuela a series of Junta governments took authority in the name of the deposed king after 19 April 1810, that led to the formation of local juntas. A meeting was convened in the city of Barcelona to proclaim the independence of the province of Barcelona (which included both the district of Barcelona and the province of Cumaná), on the 27 April. On 11 July 1810, the Supreme Junta of Caracas included Barcelona Province as one of the provinces that did not recognize the authority of the Spanish government. This led to a civil conflict between those who wanted independence from the Spanish crown and many who still recognized the authority of Spain.

The return of Francisco de Miranda to Venezuela ultimately led to the Declaration of Independence on 5 July 1811, which was quickly followed by a Civil War between those provinces who remained loyal to Spain, and the Cortes of Cádiz, and those that sought complete independence. In 1811, during the Venezuelan Independence War, La Casa Fuerte ('The House-Fort', 'The Strong House'), a building near the centre of town, located on the Avenida 5 de Julio set the scene for the period. Built on the ruins of the old Convento de San Francisco, to house the administrative government of the area, but turned into a fortification by Republican defenders to protect the city from the attacks of the Spanish authorities. On 17 April 1817, the house was taken and destroyed by royalist forces, who killed all 1,600 people barricaded inside.

After the fall of the First Republic, the royalist authorities continued to maintain the limits and structures of the province of Barcelona. But in 1821, it was integrated into the Guayana Province, and along with Cumaná and Margarita, it began to function as part of the Department of the Orinoco.

Barcelona's autonomy was re-established in 1830, and became a center during a second round of Independence battles, where important men like General José Antonio Páez headquartered, or after Independence when Antonio Guzmán Blanco spent time.

== Geography ==
Barcelona is located in the state of Anzoátegui along the northern coast of Venezuela, near the foothills of the western cordillera region. Its northern ocean boundary is peppered with many beaches, including Isla de Plata, Conoma, Arapito, Cangrejo, Lecherias and Playa Mansa, which cater to the tourist industry or local populations. Barcelona is the gateway to the Mochima National Park, an area of islands and islets that extends across the northern coast, and was designated a protected national monument.

Its hydrography is dominated by the River Neverí, which crosses the centre of town, and has been known for seasons of floodings caused excess volume. In 1972, the governor Francisco Arreaza Arreaza granted authority for the construction of cities canals to reduce these seasonal fluctuations. Similarly, the River Aragua, which also circle the settlement has been prone to flooding, most recently in 1999 in the area known as El Viñedo.

=== Climate ===
Owing to its location in the dry belt of the southern Caribbean Sea, Barcelona has a hot semi-arid climate with a wet season from June to September and a dry season from December to April. A strong rain shadow and jets parallel to the coast from the westerly monsoon winds during summer serves to preclude rainfall.

Climate data for Barcelona, Venezuela (1991–2020, extremes 1971–2020)
Month	Jan	Feb	Mar	Apr	May	Jun	Jul	Aug	Sep	Oct	Nov	Dec	Year
Record high °C (°F)	35.5 (95.9)	37.3 (99.1)	38.4 (101.1)	39.7 (103.5)	38.4 (101.1)	37.5 (99.5)	39.8 (103.6)	39.0 (102.2)	39.3 (102.7)	39.0 (102.2)	38.6 (101.5)	36.0 (96.8)	39.8 (103.6)
Mean daily maximum °C (°F)	31.7 (89.1)	32.0 (89.6)	32.7 (90.9)	33.4 (92.1)	33.2 (91.8)	32.4 (90.3)	31.9 (89.4)	32.3 (90.1)	33.0 (91.4)	32.9 (91.2)	32.6 (90.7)	31.9 (89.4)	32.5 (90.5)
Daily mean °C (°F)	26.2 (79.2)	26.8 (80.2)	27.2 (81.0)	28.5 (83.3)	28.3 (82.9)	27.5 (81.5)	26.8 (80.2)	27.1 (80.8)	27.7 (81.9)	27.7 (81.9)	27.4 (81.3)	26.7 (80.1)	27.3 (81.1)
Mean daily minimum °C (°F)	21.4 (70.5)	21.7 (71.1)	22.5 (72.5)	24.0 (75.2)	24.2 (75.6)	23.8 (74.8)	23.4 (74.1)	23.7 (74.7)	24.1 (75.4)	24.0 (75.2)	23.7 (74.7)	22.5 (72.5)	23.2 (73.8)
Record low °C (°F)	12.8 (55.0)	15.2 (59.4)	12.5 (54.5)	16.9 (62.4)	18.5 (65.3)	18.7 (65.7)	18.9 (66.0)	19.3 (66.7)	18.7 (65.7)	19.5 (67.1)	18.1 (64.6)	15.6 (60.1)	12.5 (54.5)
Average rainfall mm (inches)	6.1 (0.24)	7.3 (0.29)	10.7 (0.42)	14.0 (0.55)	46.5 (1.83)	93.3 (3.67)	132.8 (5.23)	136.6 (5.38)	83.4 (3.28)	75.0 (2.95)	58.7 (2.31)	30.3 (1.19)	694.7 (27.35)
Average rainy days (≥ 1.0 mm)	1.6	1.6	1.2	2.5	6.1	11.3	15.4	14.7	10.2	9.9	7.8	5.1	87.4
Average relative humidity (%)	72.0	71.0	70.5	72.0	72.5	75.0	76.0	76.0	74.5	74.5	75.0	73.0	73.5
Mean monthly sunshine hours	288.3	274.4	297.6	261.0	254.2	213.0	232.5	235.6	243.0	263.5	255.0	269.7	3,087.8
Mean daily sunshine hours	9.3	9.8	9.6	8.7	8.2	7.1	7.5	7.6	8.1	8.5	8.5	8.7	8.5
Source 1: NOAA (sun 1971–1990)
Source 2: Instituto Nacional de Meteorología e Hidrología (humidity 1970–1998)

=== City ===
Over time Barcelona reached the status of town and municipal seat within this territory, growing into a historical centre of industry and commerce, causing sprawl that has started to meld the other metro-poles in the region: principally the tourist-oriented

In Barcelona, where the El Morro tourism complex is located. An immense network of canals built to house thousands of local and international tourists in houses, condominiums, apartments and hotels. The complex is home to many marinas and boatyards and is a popular cruising destination for yachtsmen and sport fishing. The canals criss-cross the complex, affording virtually every dwelling access to the sea. One of the most ambitious developments within El Morro is the Maremares Resort and Spa, originally built by Daniel Camejo. Close to El Morro is the modern shopping center Centro Comercial Plaza Mayor, built in the colorful Dutch colonial style, similar to those found in Curaçao.

== Transport ==
Generál José Antonio Anzoátegui International Airport is the principal aerodrome in this region, with connections to other Venezuelan states and to the nation's capital (Caracas). In addition to bus services throughout the State of Anzoátegui, there are also maritime connections to the neighboring islands/islets (such as Las Chimanas, Cachicamo and Borracha) and a ferry to Margarita Island.

== Places of interest ==
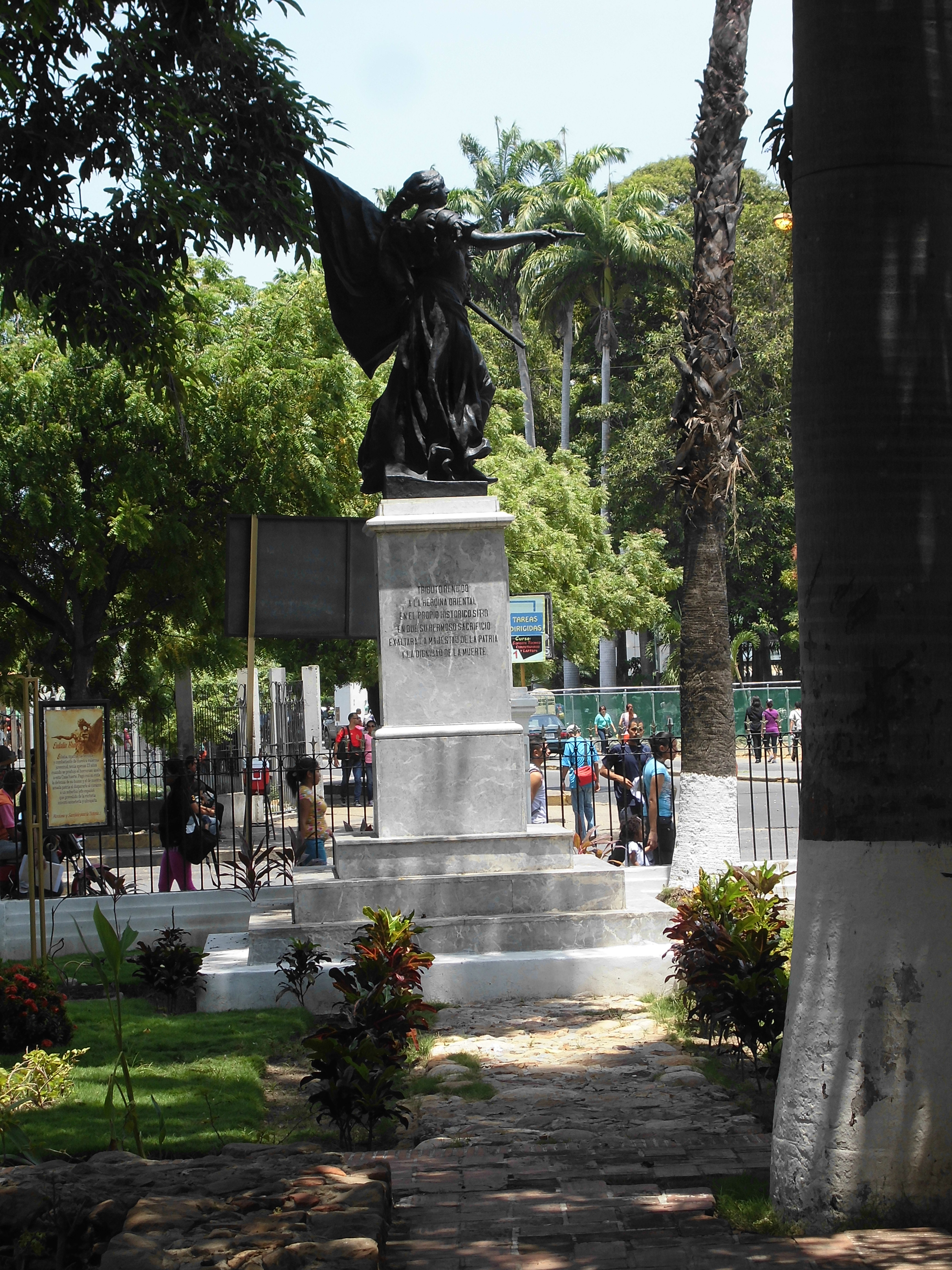
Oriental Heroine Monument

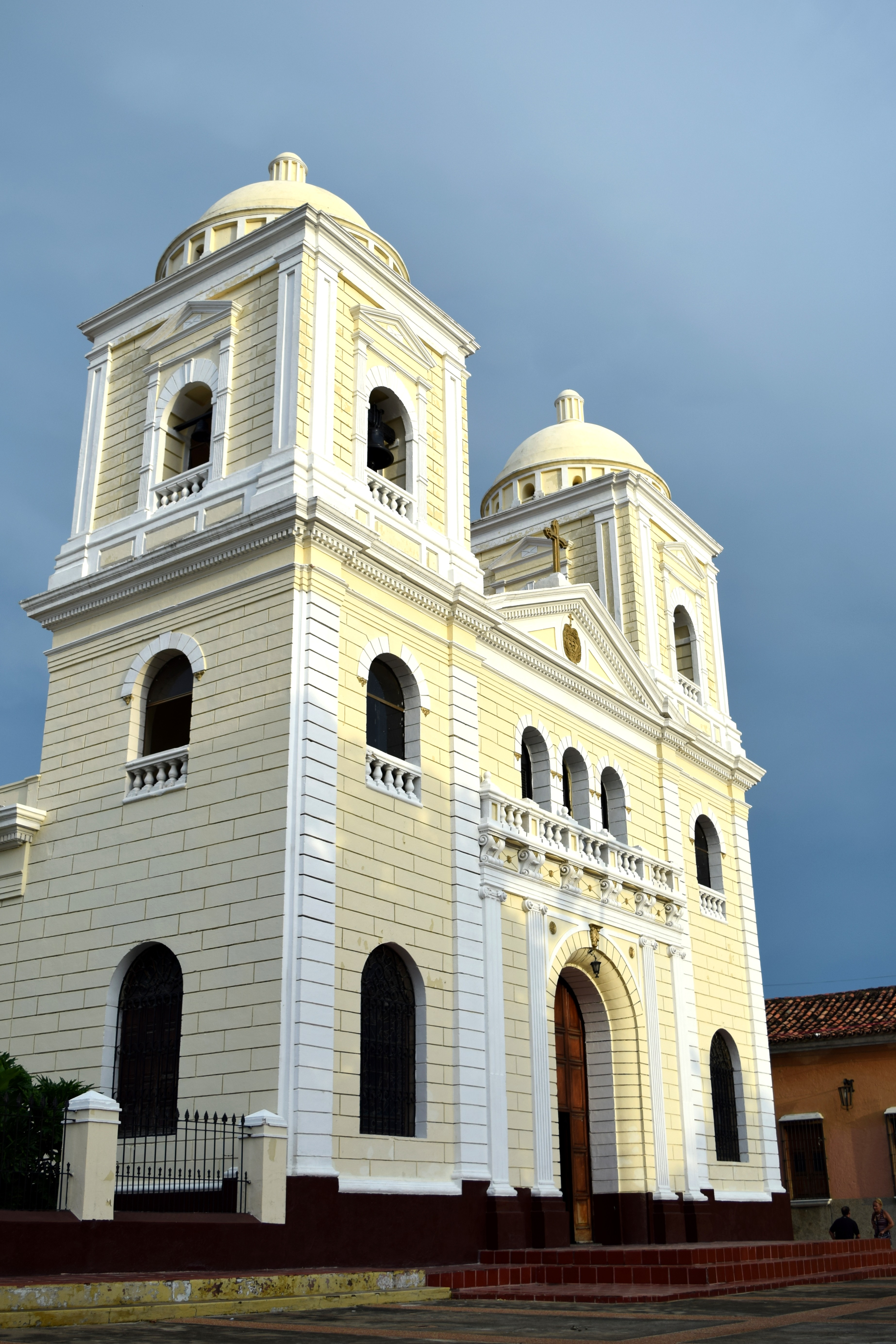
Ermita del Carmen Church

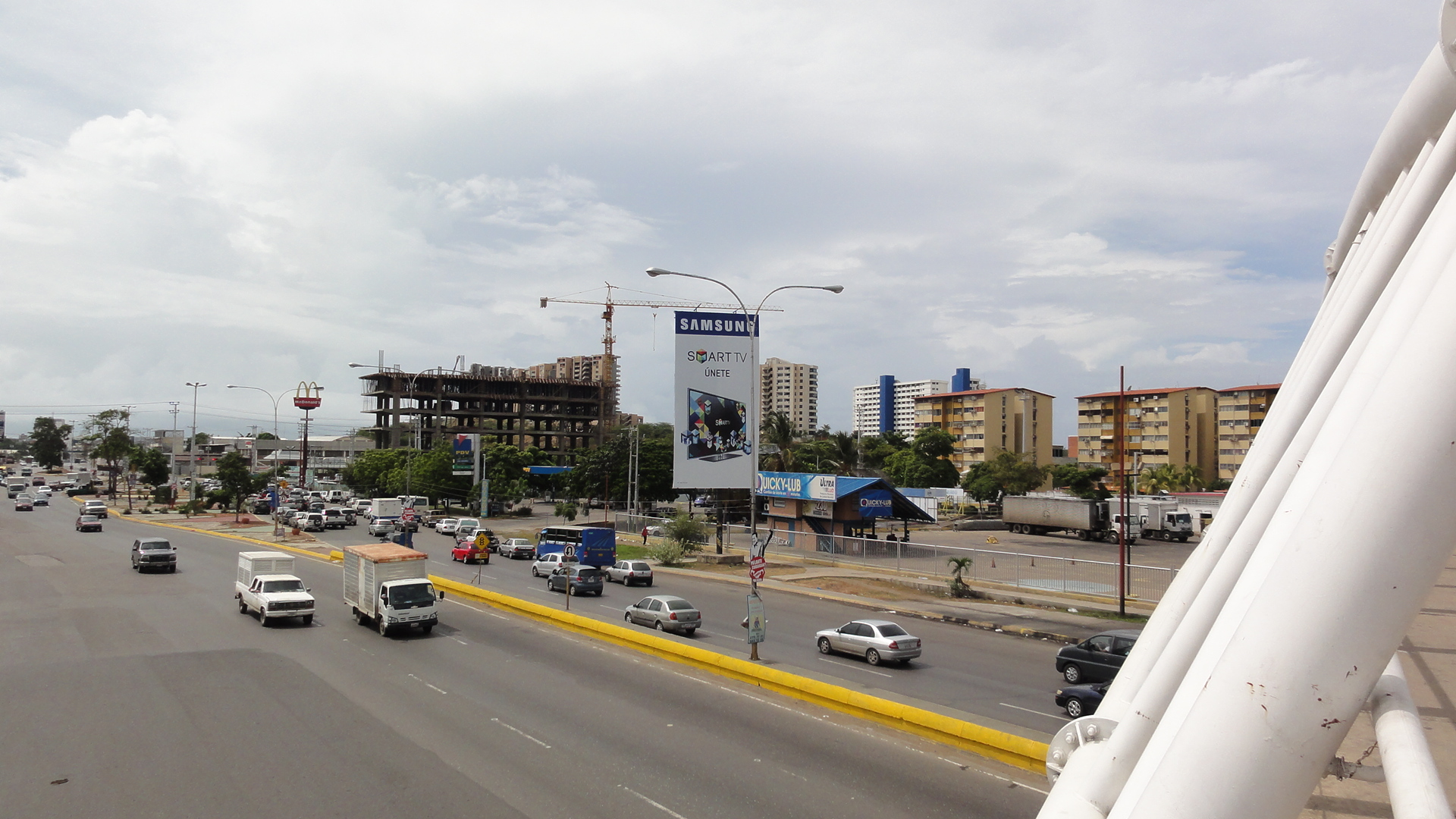
Intercomunal Avenue

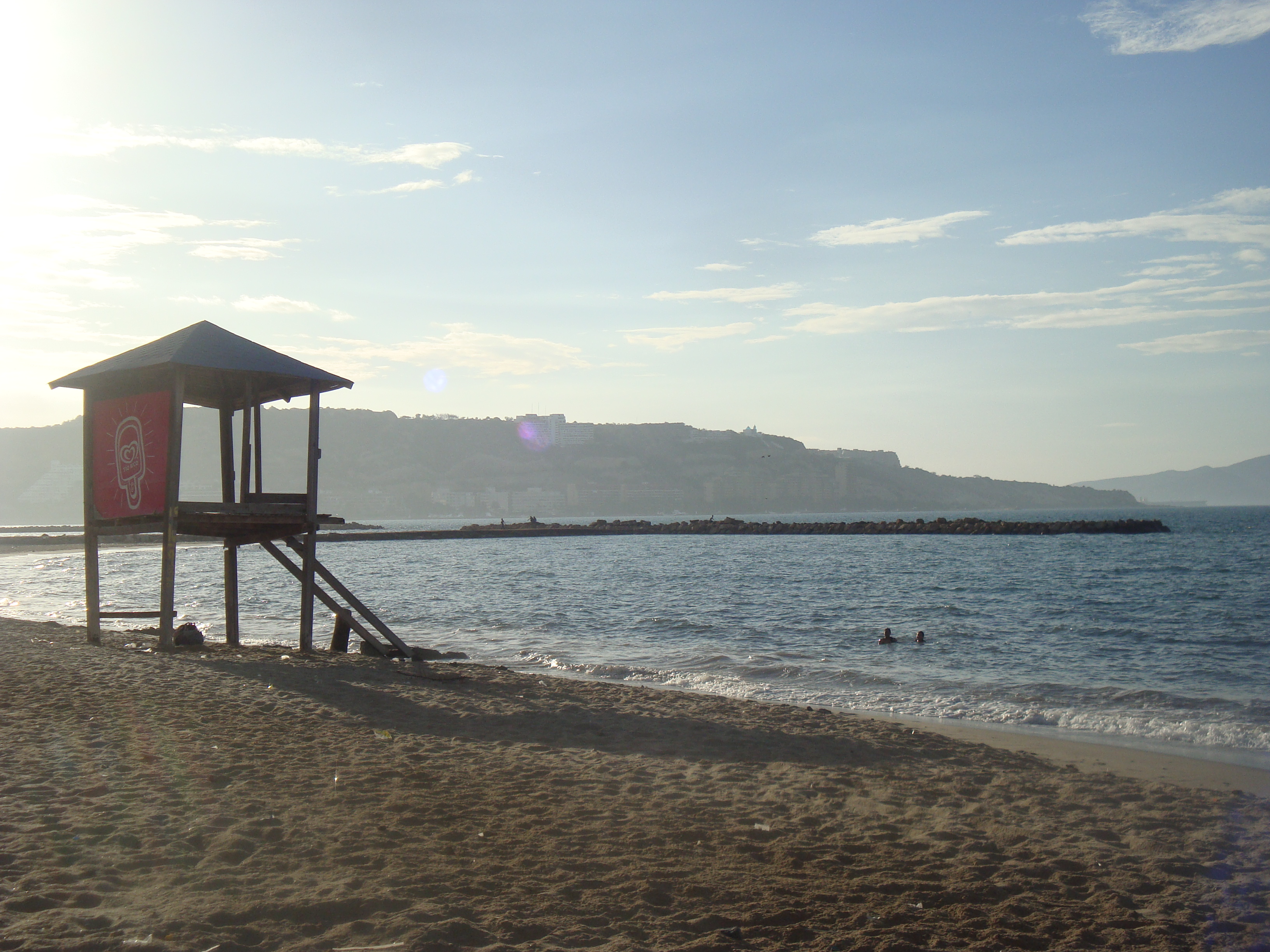
Beach in Barcelona

The Barcelona Metropolitan Area has a variety of historic sites that tell how was the place at that time. The city of Barcelona is full of historic sites, this is because it has been featured in various battles between the Spanish and Natives for its colonization. Likewise, this city has been characterized as religious and venerates various saints.

Economic activity is also history in Barcelona. There was great economic exchange through sea ports between the city and the rest of the country.

Each of these sites are intact at the time its various monuments, museums and cathedrals, which offers its visitors the most complete information about the history of the place.

- Cathedral of San Cristóbal of Barcelona: the Church of San Cristobal was begun in 1748, but due to an earthquake that left nearly destroyed, it was not until 1773 that the temple was finished.

Perhaps most important feature of this church is that under the main altar is a reliquary buried with a bone of each of the seven saints: St. Severino, St. Eustatius, St. Facundo, St. Pedro Alcantara, St. Pacific, St. Athanasius, and St. Pascual Bailon.

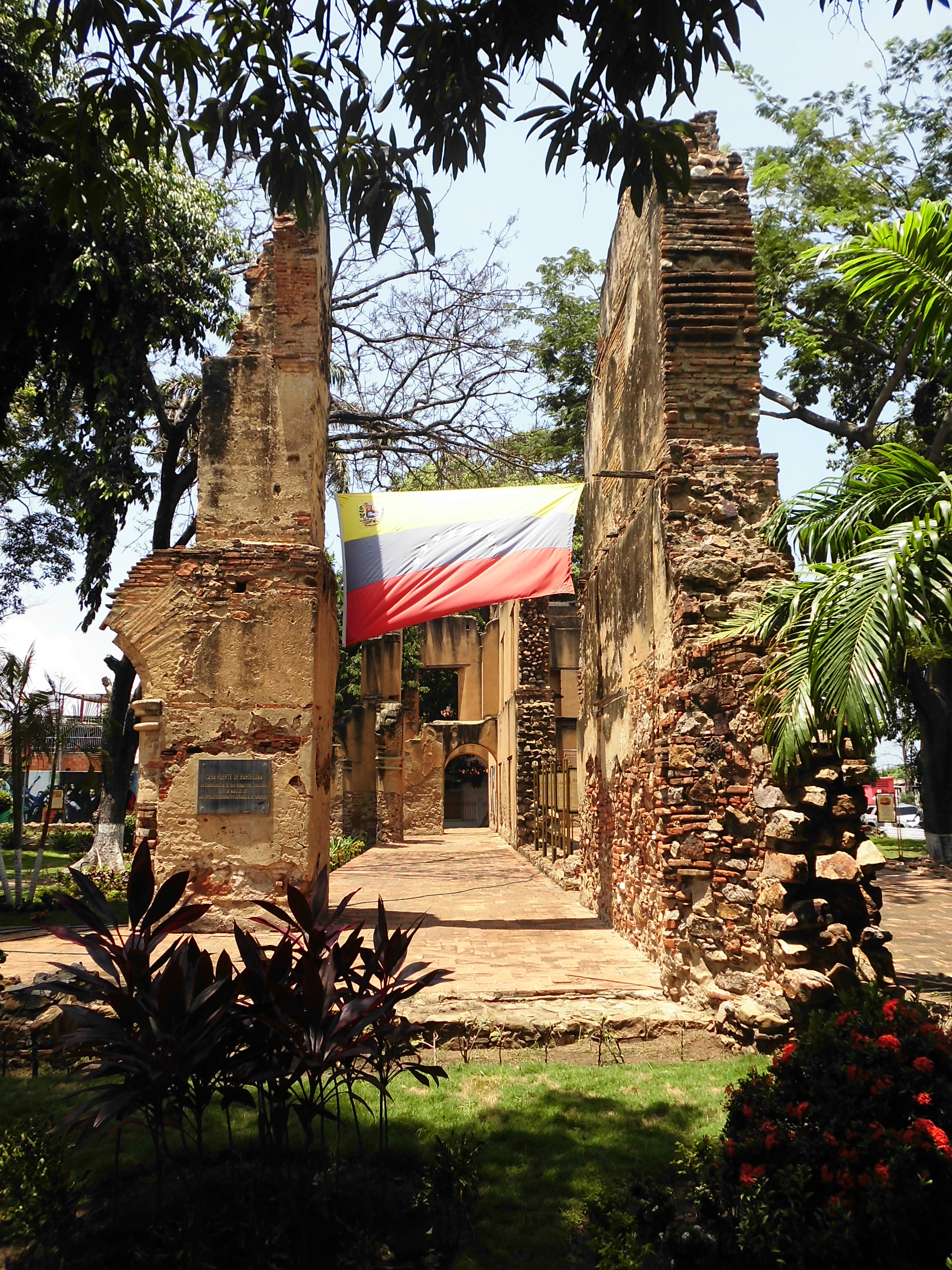
Gardens of the Casa Fuerte

Later in 1777, the Bishop of Puerto Rico, Manuel Jiménez Pérez, brought him from Rome to the church the remains of the martyr St. Celestino, who was one of the main actors of the Crusades. His remains were placed in a shrine located in Baroque and a small chapel on the left wing of the church.

The martyr St. Celestino has been revered since then by the inhabitants of Barcelona and in 1960 was proclaimed Third patron saint of Barcelona. Their celebrations are held on 3 and 4 May of each year.

- Casa de la Cultura is a restored colonial house that was donated to the city of Barcelona for the Otero Silva family. On the second floor of the house is a large permanent exhibition of works by modern painters representative of Venezuela, which is owned by the family.
- Basílica del Cristo de Jose is located on the National Highway of the Coast between Barcelona and Puerto Píritu.

Also known as "El Cristo de los Viajeros', where the faithful come daily that travel to be entrusted to him to protect them in their journey. This Basilica was built by Dr. Mariano Adrián de la Rosa with personal assets in gratitude for favors received.

- Casa Fuerte de Barcelona: this building was a former Franciscan convent transformed into a fortress by the initiative of General Pedro María Freites and Santiago Mariño.

The Casa Fuerte provided shelter to the people of this area before the invasion in 1817 by royalist Aldana.

The ruins of this building were seen as a reminder of the slaughter of April 7 of 1817, where old men, women and children were murdered by royalist forces.

To reach this historic site has to cross the Neverí river by the Boyacá bridge, and turn on the small plaza at the end of the bridge. After crossing Neverí river again, follow straight on Miranda Avenue, four blocks ahead. Visitors come to the 5 de Julio Avenue where it will turn to the left, there you will see the Plaza Bolivar and Plaza Miranda. The Casa Fuerte is opposite the Plaza Bolivar.

- Plaza Boyacá: since 1897, the city's central square is the Plaza Boyacá in honor of the most important battle won by the eponymous hero of the state, Major General José Antonio Anzoátegui. His statue stands in the center of the plaza.

This plaza was the largest in Barcelona Colonial and little has changed since its construction in 1671. the Government House and the Iglesia de San Cristóbal are still facing each other on both sides of the plaza.

To get to Plaza Boyacá, follow 5 de Julio Avenue, walk five blocks, turn left onto Carrera 11, walk three blocks, cross over to the left on 3rd Street, walk one block, then turn left onto Carrera 12 until you reach the plaza.

- Plaza Bolívar: it's a public plaza located on Avenue 5 July in Barcelona. Pays tribute to the maximum military and political leader of the wars of independence of Venezuela, General Simon Bolivar.
- Plaza Miranda
- Theater Cajigal: it's a beautiful 19th-century building, built in the Neoclassical style.

This theater is small and charming, has a capacity for 300 people. Here are several plays and concerts.

=== Gallery Images ===
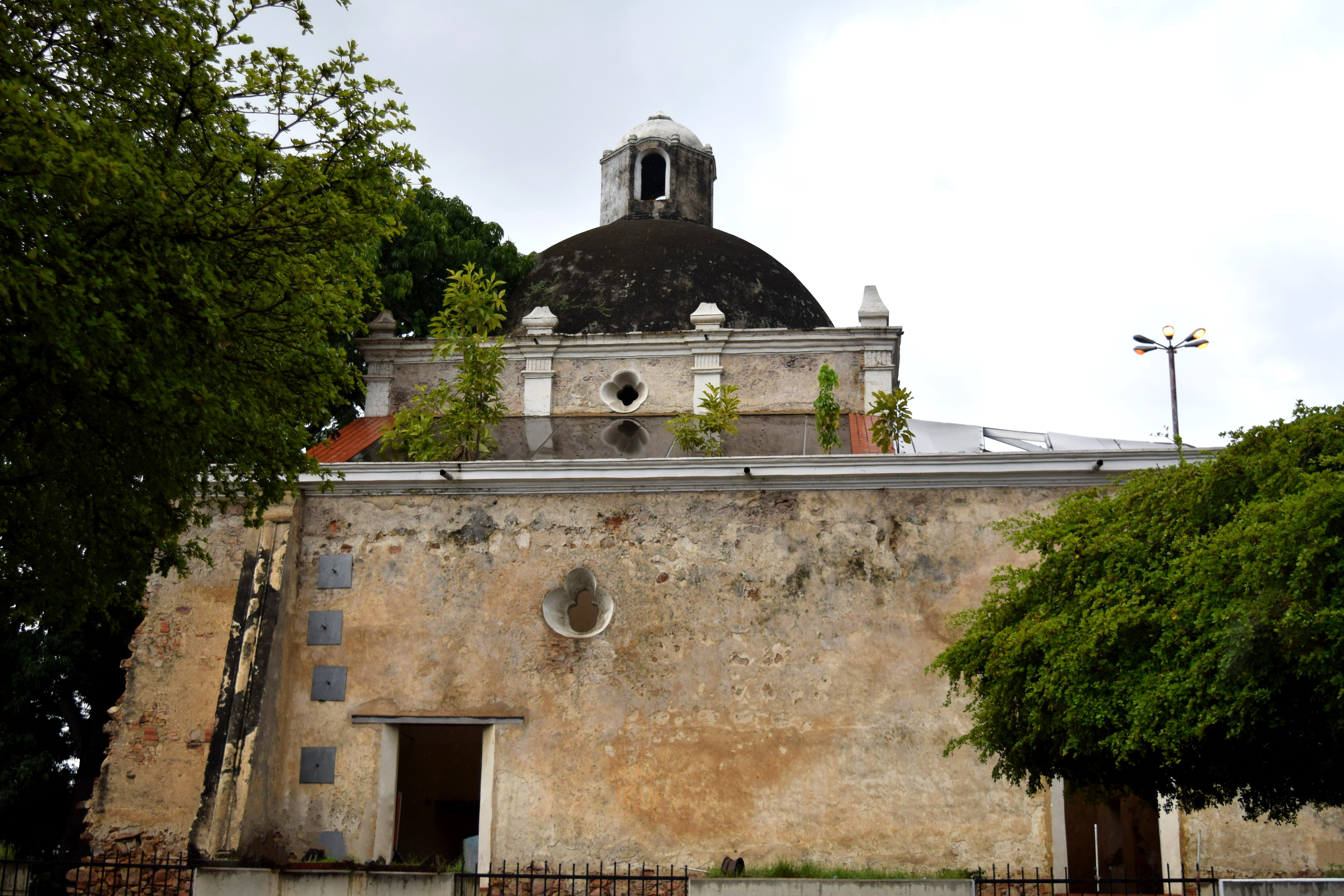
San Felipe de Neri Temple

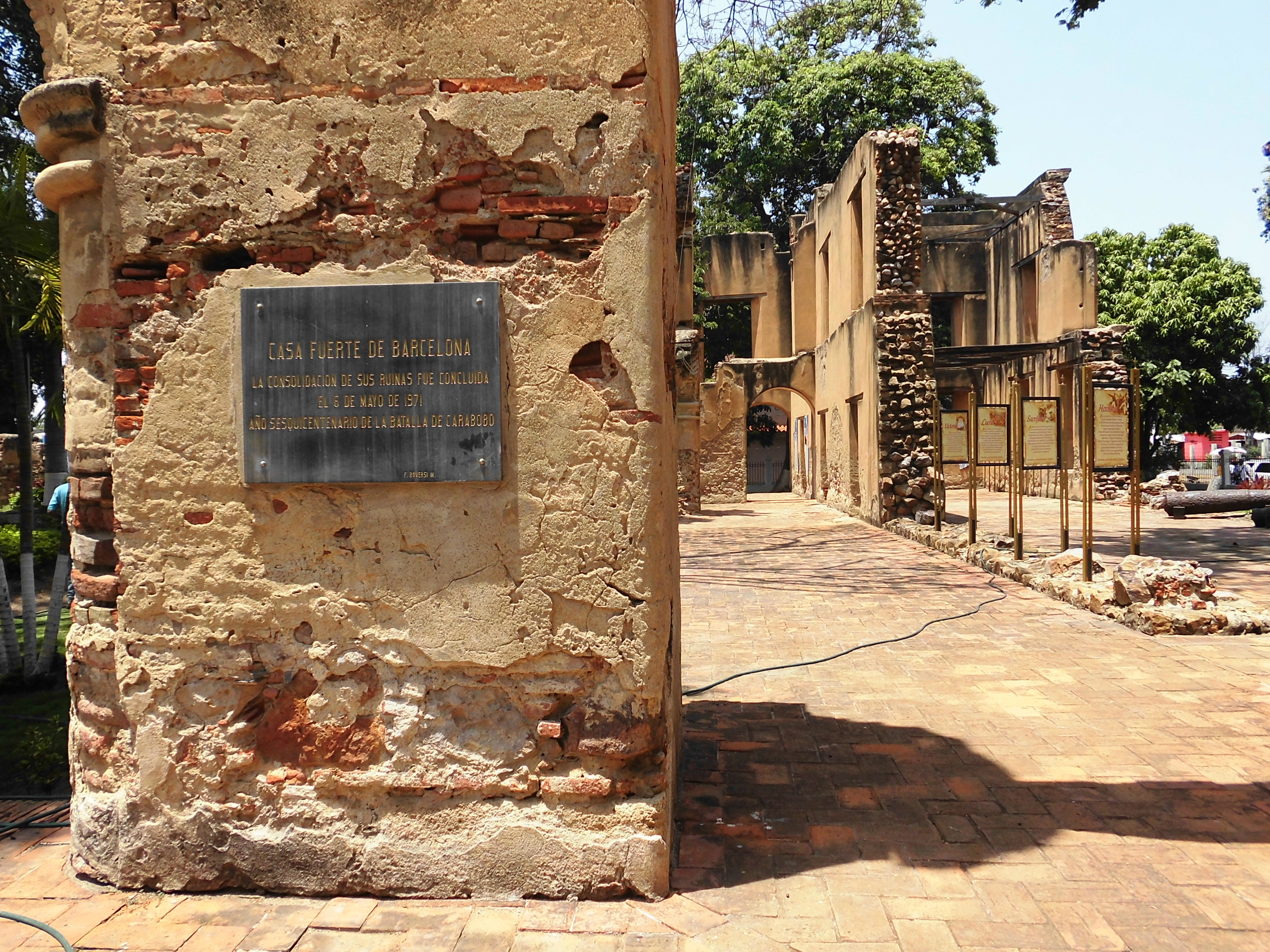
Casa Fuerte

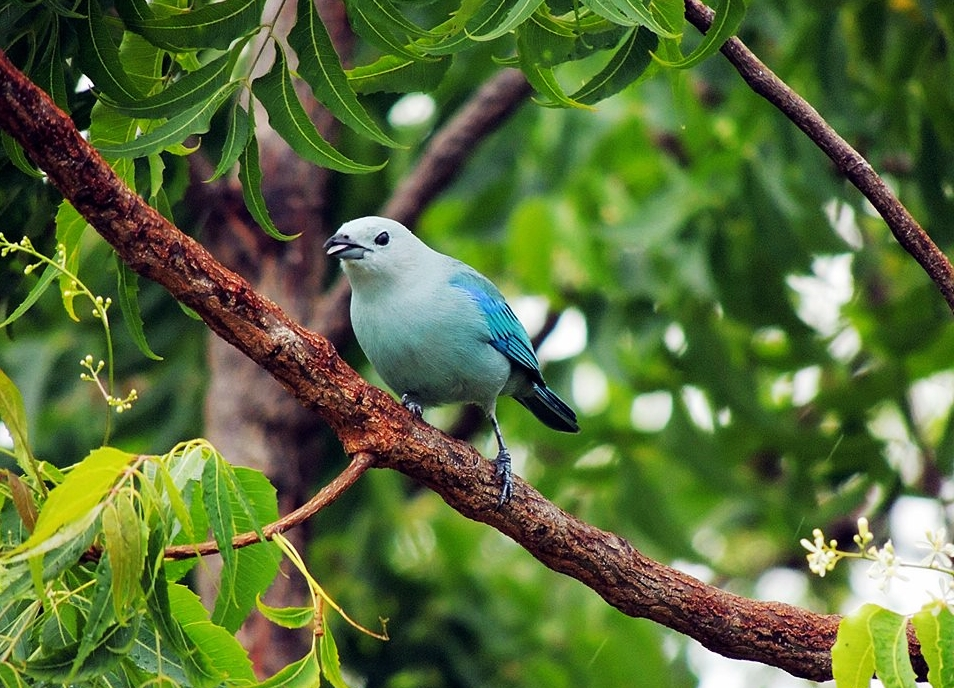
Azulejo bird in Barcelona

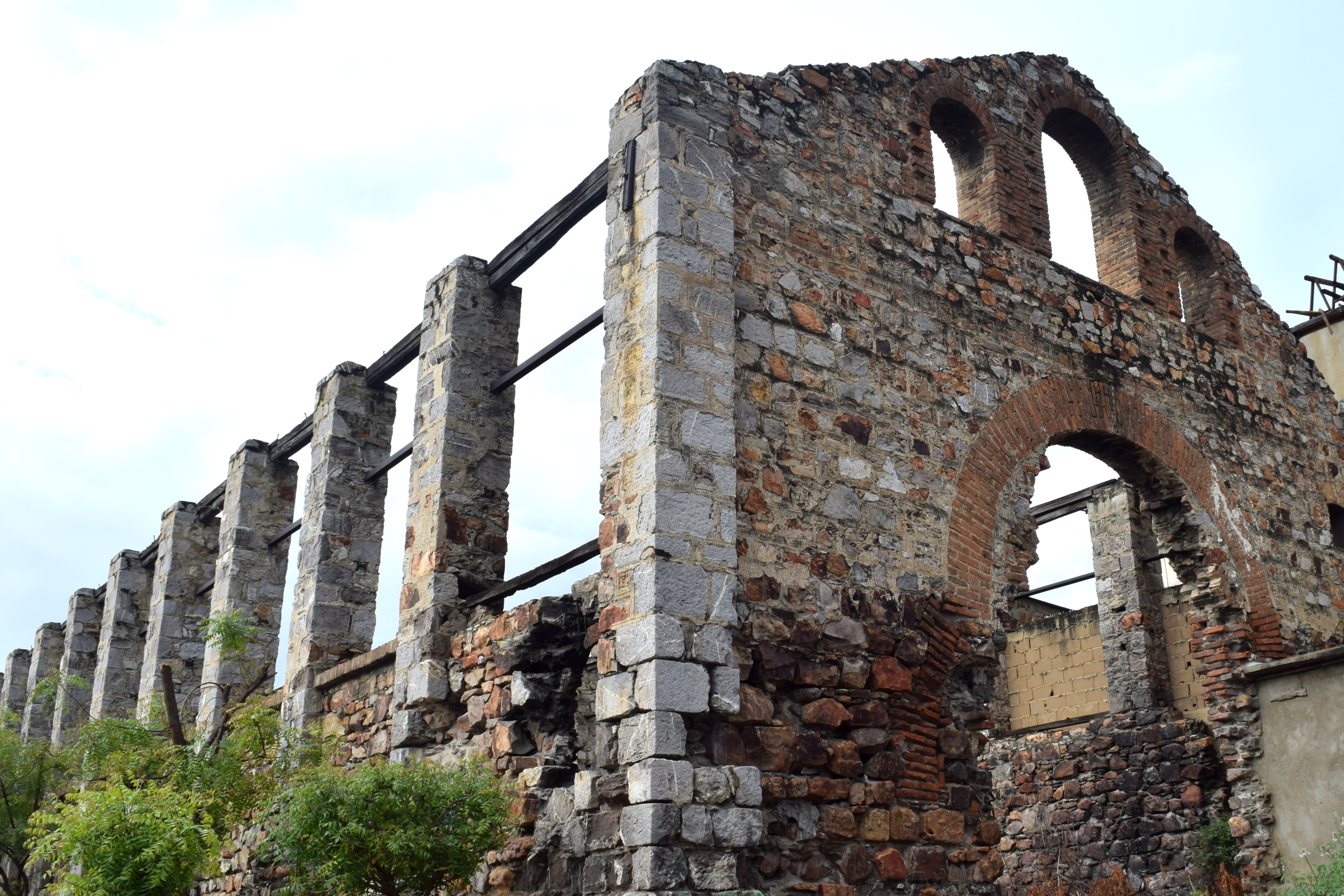
Ruins of railway workshop Guanta-Naricual

It is located in the run 15 Carabobo against Plaza Rolando, Barcelona, Anzoategui state.

- Tradition Museum: built in 1671, the Museum of the Tradition is one of the oldest houses that the city of Barcelona. This house looks exactly the Venezuelan colonial era, when the house was built.

In the past this house had access to the Neverí River, which served as a dock for boats arriving from the neighboring islands. The Museo de la Tradición consists of more than 400 items, among them the indigenous crafts, sculpture and works of Spanish colonial religious art dating from the 16th century, as well as other historical objects from the city of Barcelona.

- Plaza de La Raza
- Royal Bridge of the Spaniards: it's a colonial-style arched bridge made of stone.
- Antigua Aduana: Customs Corner is just the remnants of what was one of the most important customs houses throughout Venezuela from the colonial era. This historic site in Barcelona was for more than two centuries an important trading port between Los Llanos and the rest of Venezuela.

Currently there are only memories of the intense activity that took Barcelona port at that time and now only occupy extensive mangrove forests all over the place of what was once a customs house in the country.

- Ruins of San Felipe Neri: the Iglesia de San Felipe Neri was founded by a religious society in 1564 to develop the oratorio as a musical form and to sing the recognized oratorios of the 18th century.

The 1812 earthquake destroyed the church, but soon built a grotto to the Virgin, known as the Gruta de San Felipe and leaving only what is now known as the Ruinas de San Felipe Neri.

- The Shrine of Nuestra Señora del Carmen: the capital of Anzoategui (Barcelona) is one of the most architecturally rich cities of Venezuela. The best example is the Shrine of Nuestra Señora del Carmen that religious and relics whose forms and make it one of the most prized silver tasit of east.

Neoclassical Line History: The origins of this beautiful Eastern Church dating from the late 18th century a fervent Christian group of locals founded the Confraternity of Our Lady of Carmen. The purpose of the devotees of Carmen was devoted to the task of expanding the faith of the Virgin Mary and seek alms to build a shrine which was subsequently lifted slowly on land that donated Doña Felipa Chirinos.

The Shrine of Our Lady of Carmen had many setbacks during construction. The effects of the war of independence, the conflict between conservatives and liberals, the federal war and continuous revolutions of the 19th century led to the guild did not have enough money to finish quickly the temple which was stopped on several occasions.

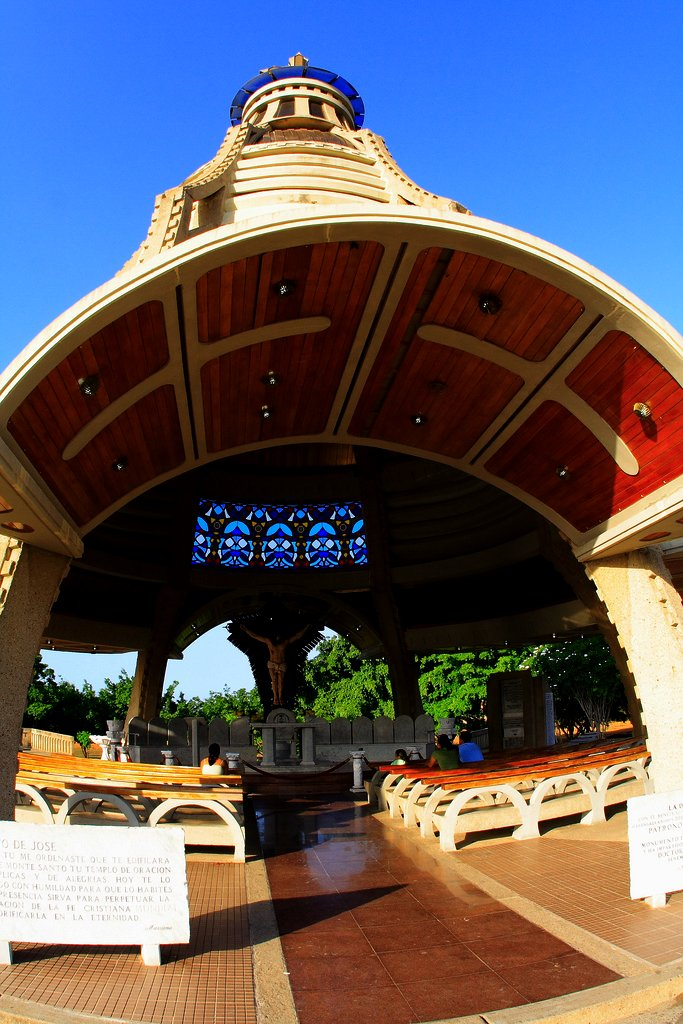
Entrance to the Basílica de San José

After nearly two centuries of construction work the Shrine of Our Lady of Carmen was officially opened in 1896. The governor of Great State of Bermúdez (current Anzoátegui, Sucre and Monagas), General Nicolás Rolando, hired the architect Ramón Irigoyen to complete the work. Previously the bishop of the Diocese of Guiana and Eastern highest ecclesiastical authority, Bishop Manuel Felipe Rodríguez allowed the priest Federico Mendoza officiated the first Mass of the shrine, on July 31 of 1887, but concluded there were still part of the main facade of neoclassical lines, the two towers, the installation of fine black and white marble floor brought the famous Italian quarry of Carrara and finally the valuable stained glass of Italian origin, which are among the most striking of Venezuela.

- Bolívar Bridge
- Naricual Hot Springs: this tourist landscape is located in the kilometer 12 of the Barcelona-San Mateo Road. They are near the same village in the Bolívar municipality, at southeast of Barcelona.

The waters have a high content of iron and soda, its color is whitish due to large portions of silt in suspension. The temperature ranges between 40 and 50 °C.

Here, the water flows from a rock to form a pool 15 meters in diameter."

- Chimana holiday resorts: the Chimana spa is a beautiful zone of coastal high, with coarse sand beaches. Its waters are crystal clear and shallow, the vegetation is xerophytic.

It is located about 45 minutes from Port Pamata Cualito. In this place is the island Chimana holiday resorts, which offers restaurant services, among others, to make visitors' stay as pleasant as possible.

- Bergantín Resorts: this spa is located in a beautiful forest flivial landscape with clear water from the mountains.

Here tourists can enjoy service kiosks, restrooms, tennis Boccia, food, among others.

This heavenly place is situated in the town of Bergantín some 64 kilometers southeast of Puerto La Cruz.

- Neverí River: born northwest of Caserío Las Culatas in Sucre state and formed at north of Cerro Tristeza (Parish Libertador of the Pedro María Freites Municipality, which is at an altitude of 2,280 meters above sea level in the Serranía de Turimiquire), "in line at the Eastern Massif, about 2,200 meters altitude".

Its course: take westbound from above leads to populations El Rincón, San Diego and Aragüita from there defines its bottom. From River receives water Macuaral Naricual and The Old Man and the streams Avocados, the still, Coricual, El Chamo, Chuponal, Higuerote, La Palma, Beijing, Peña Blanca, vicar, Seca, El Tigre, and so on.

It empties into the Caribbean Sea at the geographical coordinates 10° 10 '30 "North Latitude and 64° 43' 30" West Longitude. Its approximate distance is 103 kilometers.

== Education ==
The city is home to numerous educational institutions, among which the following stand out:

- Universidad de Oriente – Núcleo Anzoátegui, UDO. This is the main house of studies in the area and one of the most recognized nationally; it is located on Avenida Argimiro Gabaldón, at the height of the Pozuelos sector.
- National University of Tourism – Main Campus
- University Institute of Technology "General Pedro María Freites"
- Universidad Central de Venezuela, UCV – Centro Regional Barcelona, one of the most popular, located on Avenida Centurión in Nueva Barcelona
- Universidad Nacional Experimental Simón Rodríguez, UNESR, one of the most recognized. Is located on Avenida Caracas, diagonal to Plaza La Raza, and is currently building a new campus on Avenida Costanera.
- National Open University, UNA
- Universidad Gran Mariscal de Ayacucho, UGMA – Main Campus
- Universidad Santa María, USM – Eastern Campus
- Instituto Universitario Politécnico Santiago Mariño, IUPSM – Main Campus

== Sports ==
=== Basketball ===
The city is also home to the professional basketball team Marinos de Anzoátegui (formerly Marinos de Oriente) 11 times champion of the Venezuelan Professional Basketball League. They play at the Polideportivo Simón Bolívar (formerly Polideportivo Luis Ramos) better known as La Caldera del Diablo which has a capacity for 5,500 spectators.

=== Football ===
The city has the José Antonio Anzoátegui Stadium with a capacity for 40,000 fans, venue of the 2007 Copa América where matches were played by teams from Brazil, Mexico, Chile and Ecuador. It also hosted the 2009 South American U-20 Championship, where Venezuela qualified for its first World Cup in this same stadium. This stadium is also the home of the state's soccer team: Deportivo Anzoátegui, whose first team participates in the First Division of Venezuela.

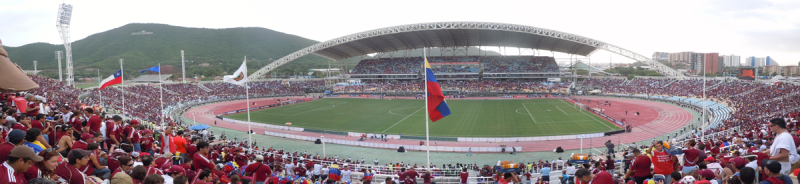
José Antonio Anzoátegui Stadium

== International relations ==
Barcelona is twinned with the following cities:

- Coimbra, Portugal
- Barcelona, Spain
- Buenos Aires, Argentina

== Notable people ==
- Jacob Baiz
- Diego Bautista Urbaneja
- Eulalia Ramos Sánchez de Chamberlain (Eulalia Buroz)
- Joan Orpí i del Pou
- José Antonio Anzoátegui
- Juan Manuel Cajigal
- Miguel Otero Silva
- Willians Astudillo, baseball player for the Fukuoka SoftBank Hawks
- Víctor Reyes, baseball player for the Detroit Tigers

== See also ==
- List of cities and towns in Venezuela
