= Islas Chimanas =

Archipelago in Venezuela

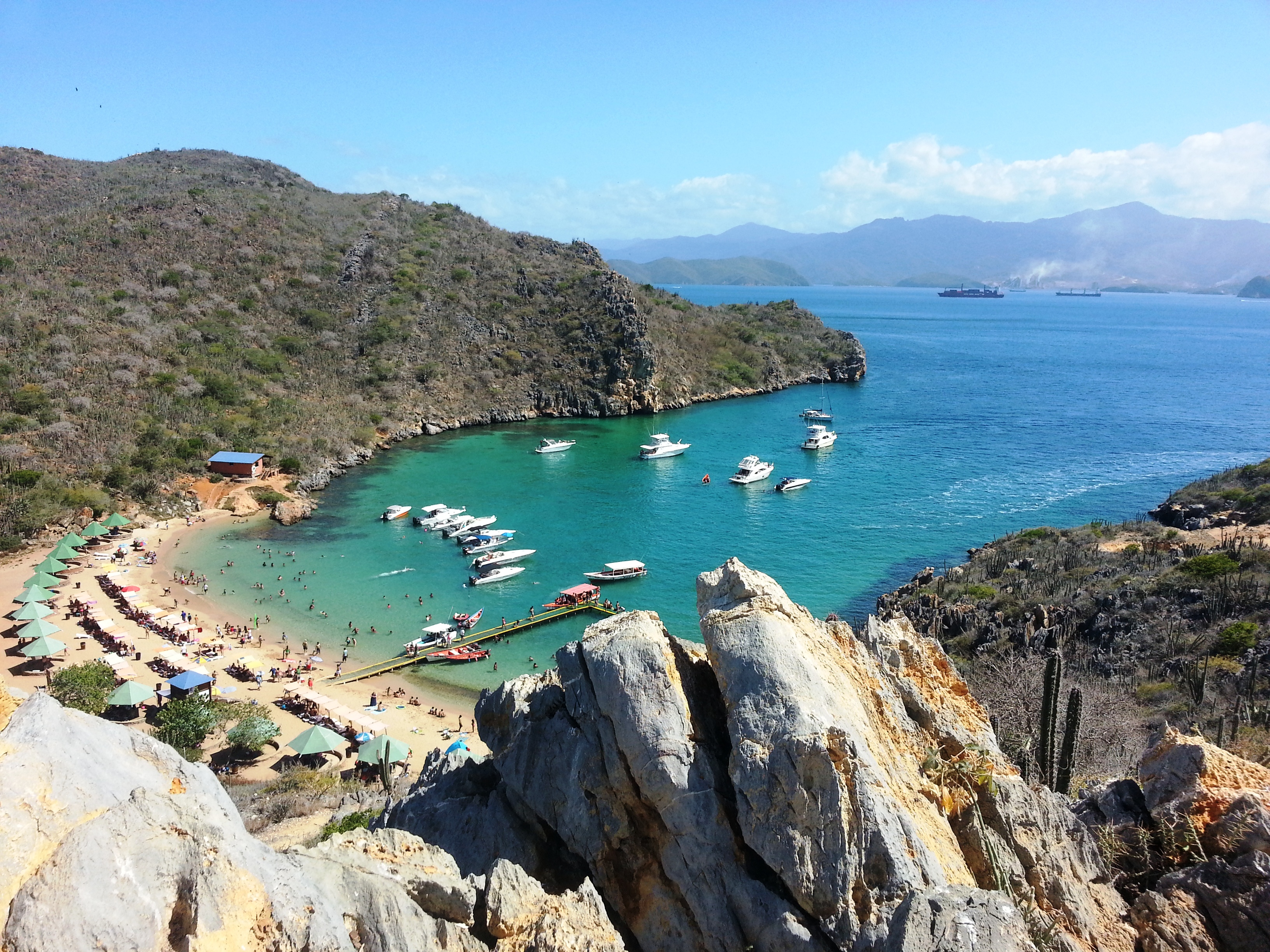
- Chimanas Islands
- Interactive map of Islas Chimanas

Geography
- Location: Caribbean Sea
- Coordinates: 10°15′41″N 64°28′48″W

Administration
- Venezuela
- Anzoátegui

Islas Chimanas is a Caribbean archipelago of 7 islands belonging to Venezuela, located off northeastern Anzoátegui state, east of the Borrachas Islands and north of the Bay of Guanta, just a few kilometers from the nearby city of Puerto La Cruz, whose special attraction based primarily on beautiful beaches and bays, from the 19 December 1973 under Decree No. 1534 belong to the Mochima National Park.

== Gallery ==
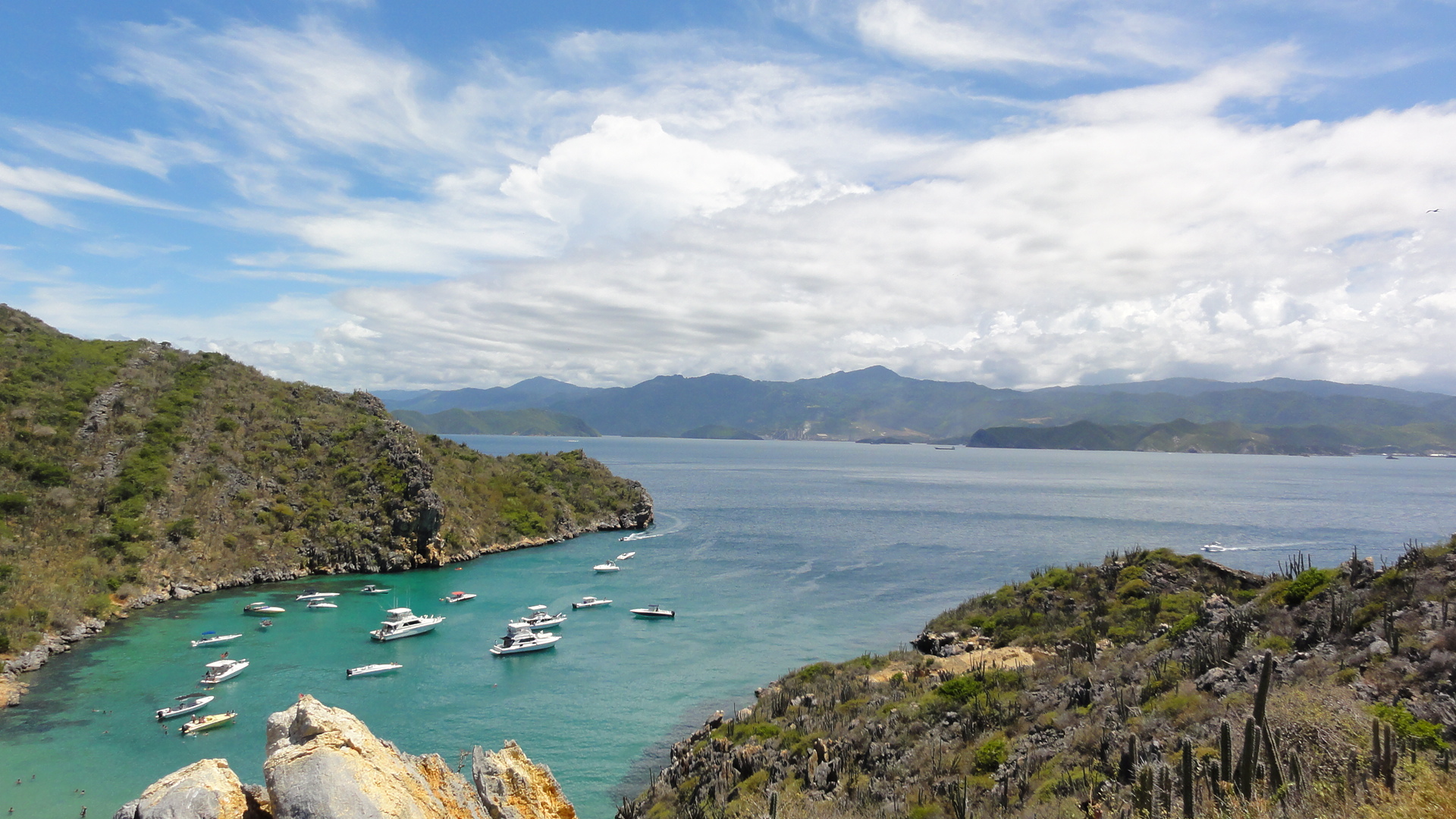

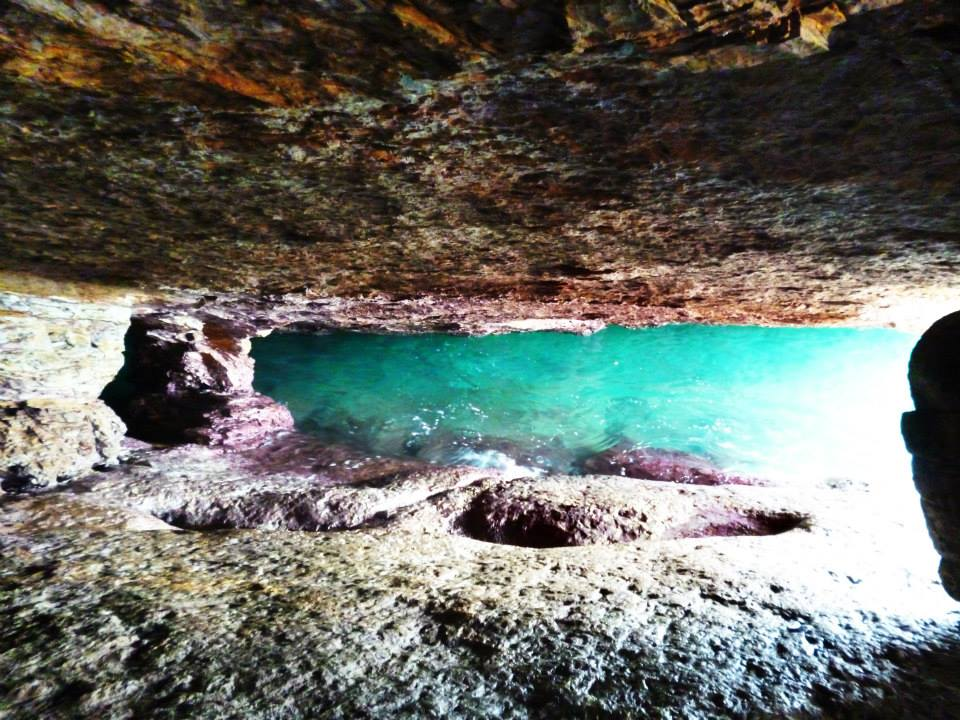

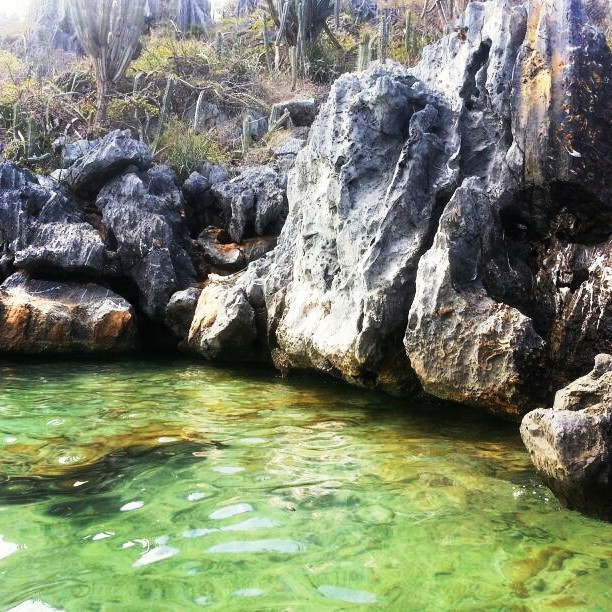

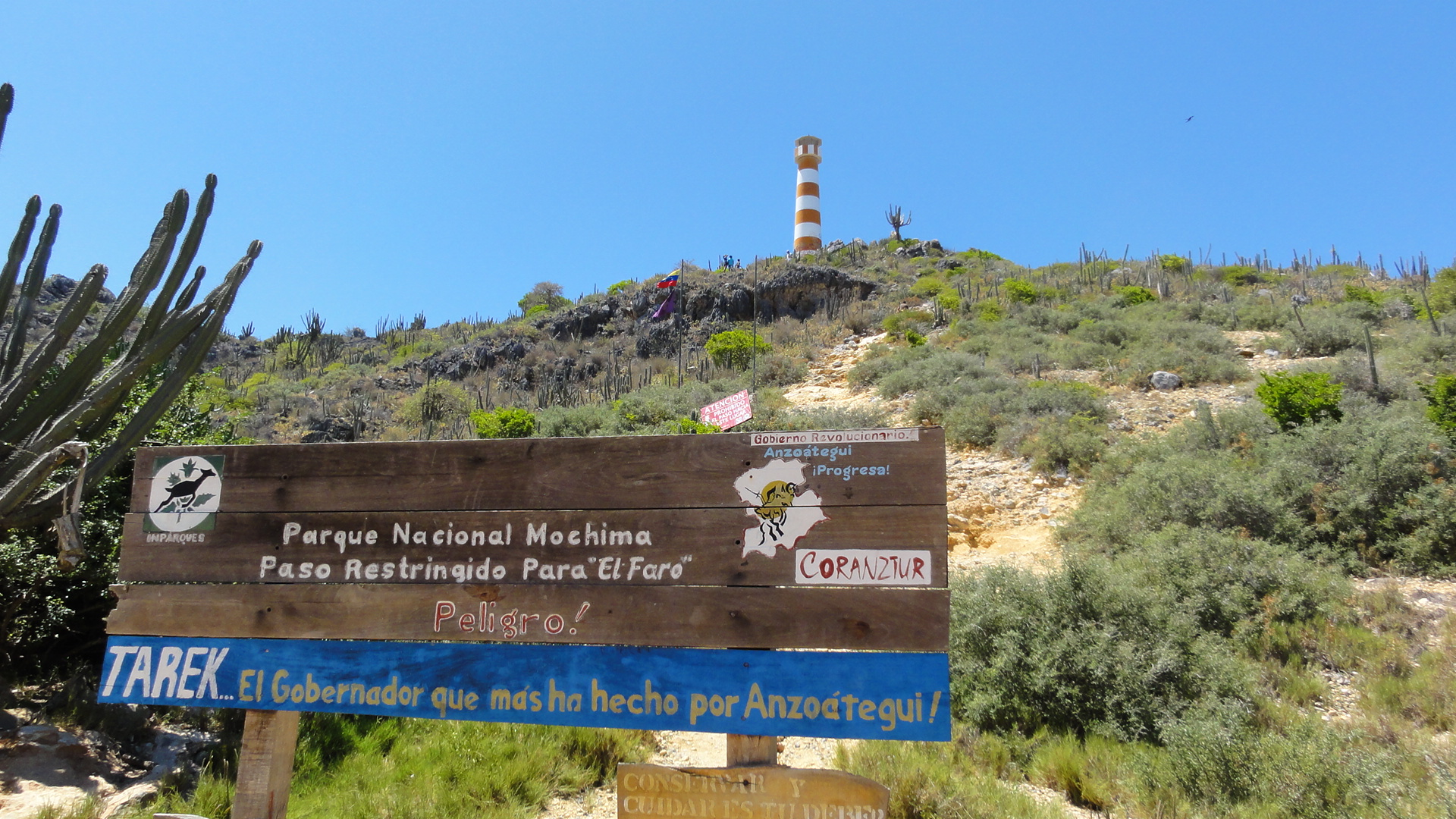

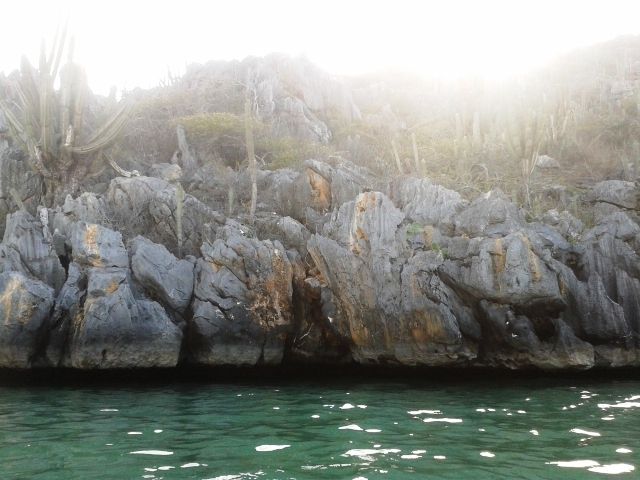

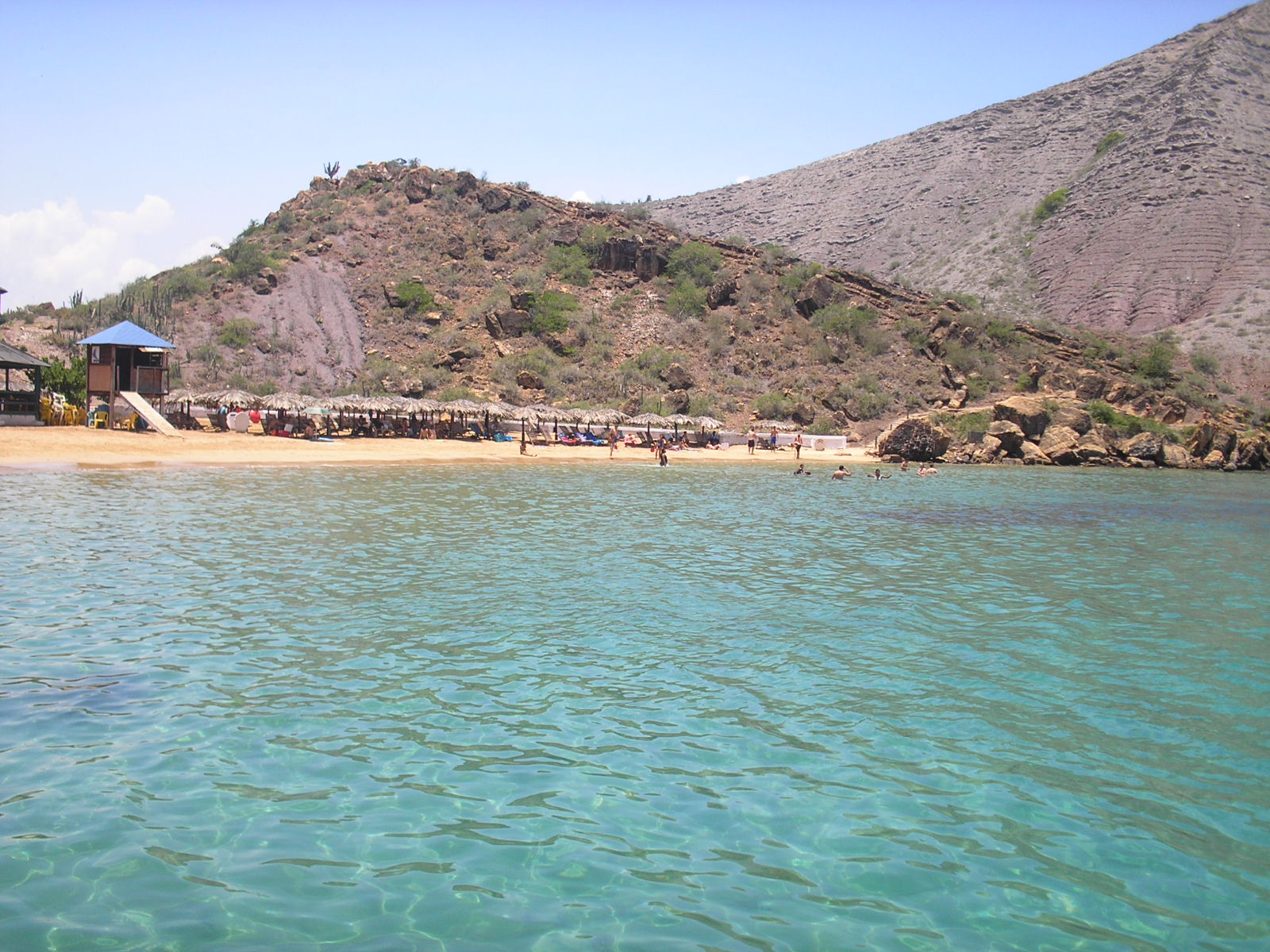

== See also ==
- Geography of Venezuela
