= Miss Venezuela 2026 =

72nd edition of the Miss Venezuela competition

- Date: December 2026
- Broadcaster: International: Venevisión Plus; DirecTV; Official broadcaster: Venevisión
- Entrants: 25

Miss Venezuela 2026 will be 73rd Miss Venezuela pageant to be held in December 2026.

Clara Vegas of Miranda will crown her successor at the end of the event, the winner will represent Venezuela at Miss Universe 2027.

== Results ==
External videos
- Miss Venezuela 2026: Mundo, Internacional, Supranacional Finals
- Miss Venezuela 2026: Mundo, Internacional, Supranacional by Miss Venezuela

=== Miss World Venezuela, Miss International Venezuela and Miss Supranational Venezuela Title ===
The Miss World Venezuela, Miss International Venezuela and Miss Supranational Venezuela titles were held as separate competitions on November 19, 2026. Mística Núñez of Falcón crowned her compatriot Sofia Pascuzzo as her successor, as Miss Venezuela World 2026. She will represent Venezuela at the Miss World 2027 pageant in Tanzania.

| Placement | Contestant | International pageant |
|---|---|---|
| Miss World Venezuela 2026 | Falcón – Sofia Pascuzzo | TBA – Miss World 2027 |
| Miss International Venezuela 2026 | Táchira – Delia Santander | TBA – Miss International 2027 |
| Miss Supranational Venezuela 2026 | Carabobo – Emiliana Carvallo | TBA – Miss Supranational 2027 |
| Top 7 | Aragua – Valentina Morales; La Guaira – Sofía Fernández; Miranda – María Isabel Barrios; Zulia – Oriana Nava | |

Also, Delia Santander of Tachira was crowned as Miss International Venezuela 2026. She will represent Venezuela at the Miss International 2027 pageant in Japan, and Emiliana Carvallo of Carabobo was crowned as Miss Supranational Venezuela 2026. She will represent Venezuela at the Miss Supranational 2027 pageant in Poland.

== Contestants ==
25 contestants will compete for the title.

| State | Contestant | Age (Note: Ages at the time of the pageant) | Height | Hometown |
|---|---|---|---|---|
| (Amazonas, Venezuela) Amazonas | Andrimar José (Andris) Benítez Jiménez | 25 | 1.77 m (5 ft 10 in) | Carúpano |
| Anzoátegui | Eugenia de los Ángeles Moreno Marramao | 24 | 1.83 m (6 ft 0 in) | Puerto La Cruz |
| Apure | Oriana Andrea Bottaro Matheus | 27 | 1.78 m (5 ft 10 in) | Mérida |
| Aragua | María Valentina Morales Hernández | 20 | 1.79 m (5 ft 10 in) | Maracay |
| Barinas | Melani Martín González | 19 | 1.72 m (5 ft 8 in) | Santa Teresa del Tuy |
| Bolívar | Sara Estefanía Fernández Aristimuño | 20 | 1.73 m (5 ft 8 in) | Upata |
| Carabobo | Emiliana Carvallo Barreto | 29 | 1.73 m (5 ft 8 in) | Caracas |
| Cojedes | Laura Sofía Núñez Salas | 22 | 1.80 m (5 ft 11 in) | Caracas |
| Delta Amacuro | Iriana Joselyn Pinto Monagas | 29 | 1.83 m (6 ft 0 in) | Maracay |
| Dependencias Federales | Victoria Duarte Alvarado | 27 | 1.78 m (5 ft 10 in) | Maracaibo |
| Distrito Capital | Jhosennys Daniela Sotillo Siso | 28 | 1.74 m (5 ft 9 in) | San Félix |
| Falcón | Sofía Cristina Pascuzzo Rotondaro | 25 | 1.76 m (5 ft 9 in) | Caracas |
| Guárico | Josefa Antonia Claudia Valentina Herrera Olivares | 33 | 1.76 m (5 ft 9 in) | San Fernando de Apure |
| (La Guaira (state)) La Guaira | Sofía Valentina Fernández Mendoza | 22 | 1.80 m (5 ft 11 in) | Caraballeda |
| Lara | Albany Antonieta Camacaro | 26 | 1.77 m (5 ft 10 in) | Barquisimeto |
| Mérida | Lexly Yuliangel Vergel Nava | 26 | 1.74 m (5 ft 9 in) | Mérida |
| Miranda | María Isabel Barrios Rodríguez | 26 | 1.73 m (5 ft 8 in) | Caracas |
| Monagas | Grecia Andreína Bitchachi Chinchilla | 28 | 1.74 m (5 ft 9 in) | Caracas |
| Nueva Esparta | Sara Pignataro Apicella | 24 | 1.70 m (5 ft 7 in) | Caracas |
| Portuguesa | Shuruk Chirijan El Bounna Paredes | 26 | 1.75 m (5 ft 9 in) | Boconó |
| Sucre | Fanny de los Ángeles Martínez Contreras | 21 | 1.78 m (5 ft 10 in) | Cumaná |
| Táchira | Delia María Santander Moreno | 24 | 1.72 m (5 ft 8 in) | La Grita |
| Trujillo | María Berenice de Los Ángeles Aguilar Gallardo | 26 | 1.73 m (5 ft 8 in) | San Rafael de Carvajal |
| Yaracuy | Gabriela Cristina Vegas Medina | 23 | 1.74 m (5 ft 9 in) | Caracas |
| Zulia | Oriana Alejandra Nava Torrealba | 27 | 1.75 m (5 ft 9 in) | Maracaibo |
