= Carache Municipality =

Carache Reseña Histórica Municipio Carache
- Municipality
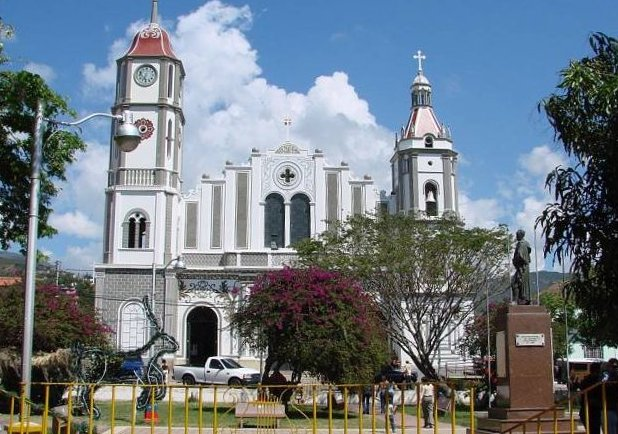
- Church of San Juan in Carache

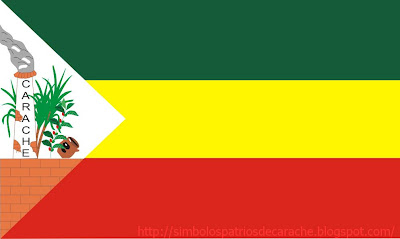
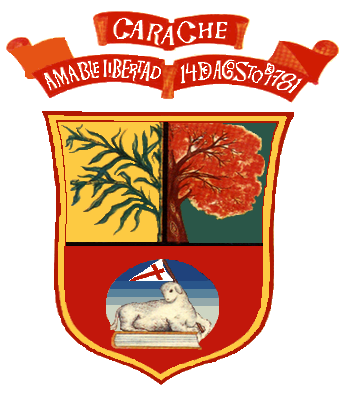
- Flag Seal

- Location in Trujillo
- Coordinates: 9°42′26″N 70°11′36″W
- Country: Venezuela
- State: Trujillo
- Founded: 1560
- Municipal seat: Carache

Government
  - Mayor: Carlos Iglesias Montilla ((PSUV))

Area
  - Total: 957 km^{2} (369 sq mi)

Population (2011)
  - Total: 32,820
  - Density: 34.3/km^{2} (88.8/sq mi)
- Time zone: UTC−4 (VET)

Carache is one of the 20 municipalities of the state of Trujillo, Venezuela. The municipality occupies an area of 957 km² with a population of 32,820 inhabitants according to the 2011 census.

== Towns and parishes ==
The municipality is divided into the following parishes, each of which contain smaller towns.

- Carache: 11,592 (40% of pop.)
- La Concepción: 5,583 (19%)
- Cuicas: 5,825 (20%)
- Panamericana: 1,926 (7%)
- Santa Cruz: 4,125 (14%)

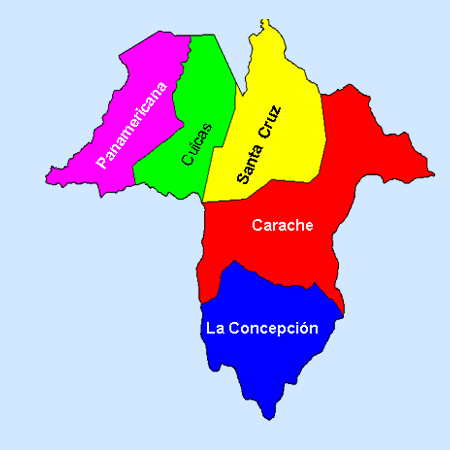
Map of the parishes of Carache

=== Carache ===
- Agua De Obispo
- La Peña
- Las Palmas
- Las Peñitas
- La Laguneta
- La Ranchería
- Loma Pancha
- Las Adjuntas
- Vega Arriba
- Miquimbay
- El Cortijo
- El Potrero
- Mesa Arriba
- Cahingó
- Mesa Abajo
- Mirinday
- San Antonio
- Las Montañitas
- Loma Del Medio
- Loma De San Juan
- Loma De Bonilla
- Picachitos
- La Unión
- La Morita
- Río Abajo
- La Platera
- La Playa
- Los Patiecitos
- Los Cardones
- Cerro Mupi
- Cerro La Cruz
- Barrio El Sartén
- Tejerías
- Brisas De San Juan
- Cuatro Vientos
- Palo Negro
- La Calera
- Cerro San Juan
- Centro De Carache
- Las Mesitas
- Santa Eduvigis
- Urbanización El Rosario
- El Bucarito
- Bojoto después de la quebrada

=== La Concepción ===
- Portachuelo
- Río Arriba
- Sisi
- Cendé
- Polipodio
- Biticuy
- El Potrero
- El Potrerito
- La Alcabala
- El Molino
- Los Guajes
- El Chepe
- Miquimu
- Bogoto
- Mesa Postrera
- La Becerrera
- Miquia Arriba
- Miquia Abajo
- Quebrada Arriba
- Quebrada Seca
- Quebrada De Agua
- Centro De La Concepción
- Betichope
- Sánchez Cortez
- Las Mesitas
- Los Totumos
- El Pupitre

=== Cuicas ===
- Cerro Largo
- Cerro Libre
- La Placita
- Arenales
- El Filo
- San Juan
- El Castillo
- Palmas Reales
- El Helechal
- Casa De Zinc
- Cerro Gordo
- El Paramito Frío
- Ventilación
- El Cumbe
- Japaz
- Cuicas
- Cerro Gordo
- Centro De Cuicas
- Barrio Nuevo
- La Pirela
- La Guajira
- El Tesoro
- La Invasión
- Barrio La Providencia
- El Calvario
- Campo Lindo
- El Vigía
- Barrio Moscú
- Las minas
- Palmira
- Frutas coloradas
- Los Chaos la Rivera

=== Santa Cruz ===
- La Cuchilla
- Santo Domingo
- El Fundo
- Mongon
- Madre Vieja
- El Trentino
- Puente Villegas
- Valle Hondo
- El Santero
- La Acequia

=== Panamericana ===
- San Felipe
- Santa Rosa
- El Paramito Caliente
- La Rivera
- El Cerrito
- Zapatero
- San Miguel
- Caño Arriba
