= Juan Vicente Campo Elías Municipality =

Juan Vicente Campo Elías Municipality Municipio Juan Vicente Campo Elías
- Municipality
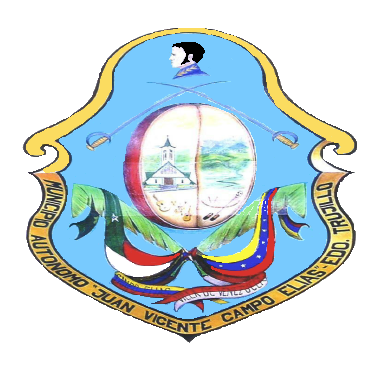
- Flag Seal

- Location in Trujillo

- Location in Venezuela
- Coordinates: 10°14′00″N 68°55′00″W
- Country: Venezuela
- State: Trujillo
- Established: 9 June 1994
- Municipal seat: Campo Elías

Government
  - Mayor: José Torrealba Moreno (PSUV)

Area
  - Total: 98 km^{2} (38 sq mi)
- Elevation: 2,200 m (7,200 ft)

Population (2011)
  - Total: 5,959
  - Density: 61/km^{2} (160/sq mi)
- Time zone: UTC−4 (VET)
- Website: https://juanvicentecampoelias-trujillo.gov.ve/

Juan Vicente Campo Elías is one of the 20 municipalities of the state of Trujillo, Venezuela. The municipality occupies an area of 98 km^{2} with a population of 5,959 inhabitants according to the 2011 census.

== Parishes ==
The municipality consists of the following two parishes:

- Arnoldo Gabaldón
- Campo Elías
