= Boconó Municipality =

Boconó Municipality Municipio Boconó
- Municipality
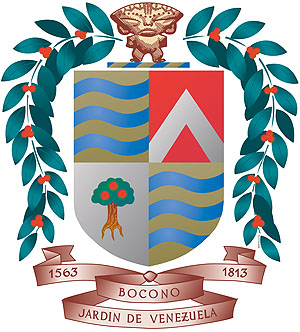
- Flag Seal

- Location in Trujillo

- Location in Venezuela
- Coordinates: 9°14′46″N 70°15′42″W
- Country: Venezuela
- State: Trujillo
- Established: October 2001
- Municipal seat: Boconó

Government
  - Mayor: Alejandro García Castellano (PSUV)

Area
  - Total: 1,365 km^{2} (527 sq mi)
- Elevation: 1,225 m (4,019 ft)

Population (2011)
  - Total: 100,240
  - Density: 73.44/km^{2} (190.2/sq mi)
- Time zone: UTC−4 (VET)

Boconó is one of the 20 municipalities of the state of Trujillo, Venezuela. The municipality occupies an area of 1,365 km^{2} with a population of 100,240 inhabitants according to the 2011 census. Its shire town is Boconó.

== Parishes ==
The municipality consists of the following 12 parishes, with the seat of each in parentheses:

- Ayacucho (Batatal)
- Boconó (Boconó)
- Burbusay (Burbusay)
- El Carmen (El Carmen)
- General Rivas (Las Mesitas)
- Guaramacal (Guaramacal)
- Monseñor Jáuregui (Niquitao)
- Mosquey (Mosquey)
- Rafael Rangel (San Rafael)
- San José (Tostós)
- San Miguel (San Miguel)
- Vega de Guaramacal (Vega de Guaramacal)
