= Sucre Municipality, Trujillo =

Sucre Municipality Municipio Sucre
- Municipality
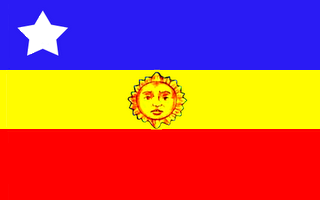
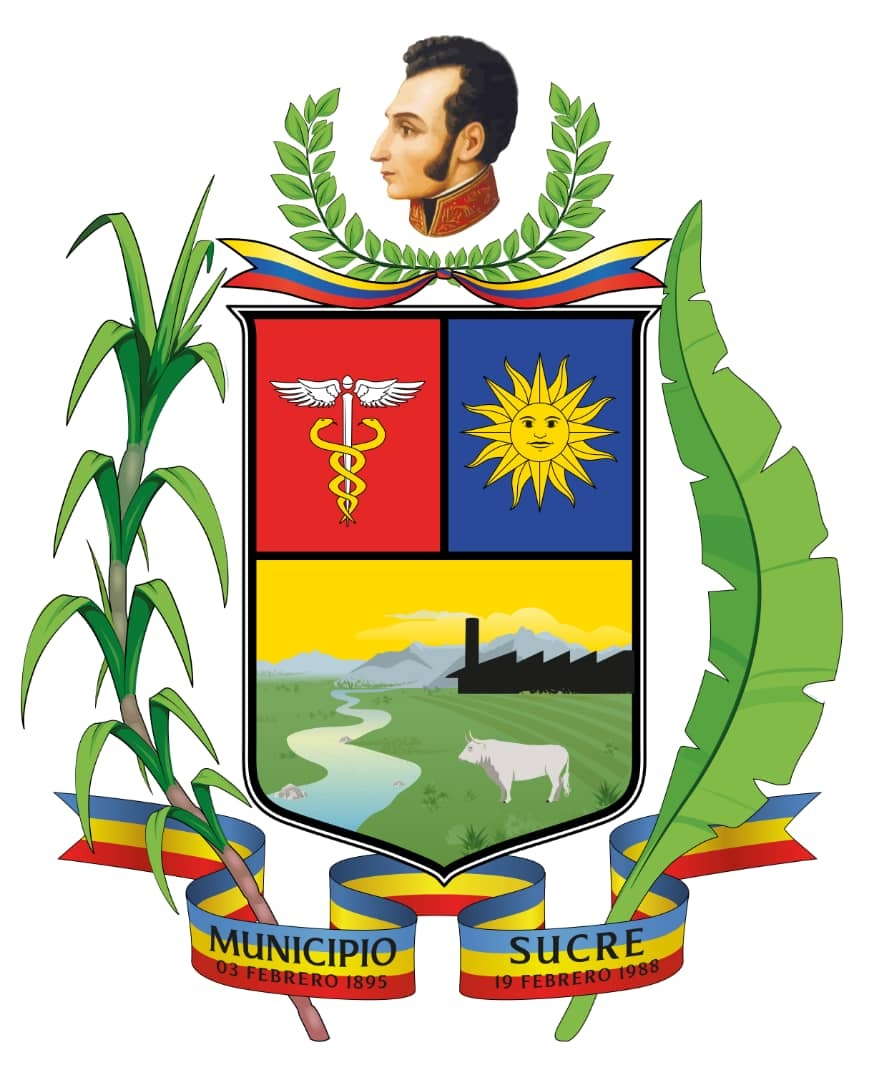
- Flag Seal

- Location in Trujillo

- Location in Venezuela
- Coordinates: 9°26′02″N 70°46′24″W
- Country: Venezuela
- State: Trujillo
- Municipal seat: Sabana de Mendoza

Government
  - Mayor: Keiver Peña (MUD)

Area
  - Total: 214 km^{2} (83 sq mi)
- Elevation: 122 m (400 ft)

Population (2011)
  - Total: 30,715
  - Density: 144/km^{2} (372/sq mi)
- Time zone: UTC−4 (VET)

Sucre is one of the 20 municipalities of the state of Trujillo, Venezuela. The municipality occupies an area of 214 km^{2} with a population of 30,715 inhabitants according to the 2011 census.

== Parishes ==
The municipality consists of the following four parishes:

- El Paraíso
- Junín
- Sabana de Mendoza
- Valmore Rodríguez
