= Bolívar Municipality, Trujillo =

Bolívar Municipality Municipio Bolívar
- Municipality
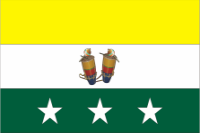
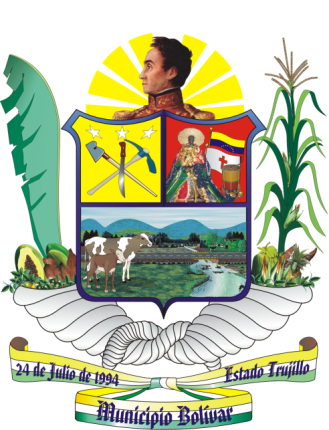
- Flag Seal

- Location in Trujillo

- Location in Venezuela
- Coordinates: 9°35′37″N 69°52′02″W
- Country: Venezuela
- State: Trujillo
- Established: 1962
- Municipal seat: Sabana Grande

Government
  - Mayor: María Nuñez de Nava (PSUV)

Area
  - Total: 208 km^{2} (80 sq mi)
- Elevation: 135 m (443 ft)

Population (2011)
  - Total: 15,285
  - Density: 73.5/km^{2} (190/sq mi)
- Time zone: UTC−4 (VET)

Bolívar is one of the 20 municipalities of the state of Trujillo, Venezuela. The municipality occupies an area of 208 km^{2} with a population of 15,285 inhabitants according to the 2011 census.

== Parishes ==
The municipality consists of the following three parishes:

- Cheregüé
- Granados
- Sabana Grande
