= Miranda Municipality, Trujillo =

Miranda Municipality Municipio Miranda
- Municipality
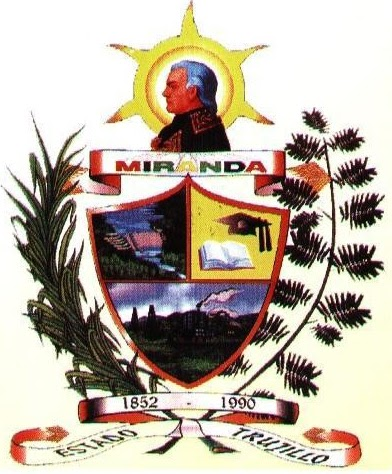
- Flag Seal

- Location in Trujillo

- Location in Venezuela
- Coordinates: 9°28′33″N 70°44′09″W
- Country: Venezuela
- State: Trujillo

Government
  - Mayor: Jhonny González Barrios (PSUV)

Area
  - Total: 374 km^{2} (144 sq mi)

Population (2011)
  - Total: 29,445
  - Density: 78.7/km^{2} (204/sq mi)
- Time zone: UTC−4 (VET)
- Website: Official website

Miranda is one of the 20 municipalities (municipios) that makes up the Venezuelan state of Trujillo and, according to a 2011 population estimate by the National Institute of Statistics of Venezuela, the municipality has a population of 29,445. The town of El Dividive is the municipal seat of Miranda Municipality.
