= Escuque Municipality =

Escuque Municipality Municipio Escuque
- Municipality
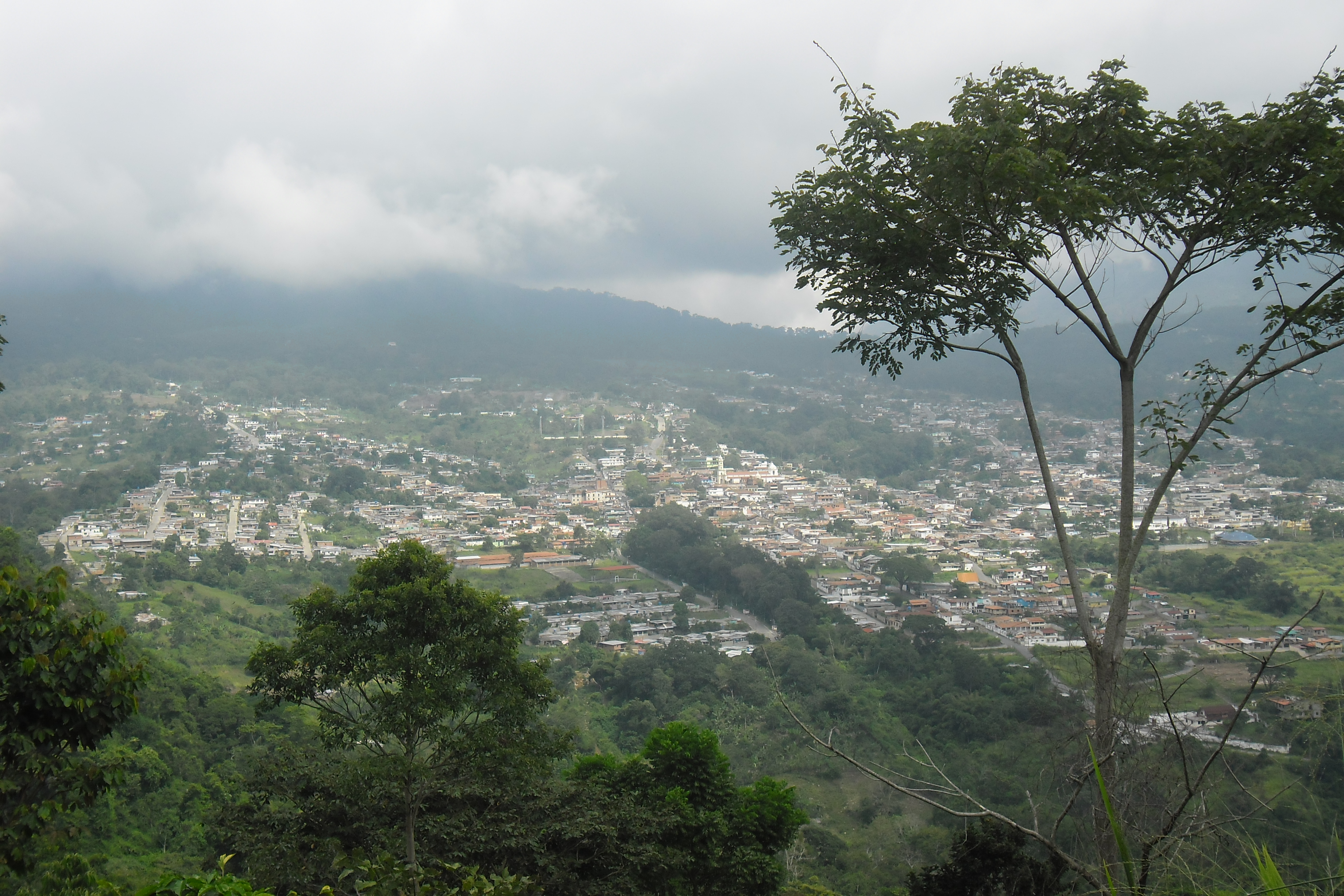
- Panorama of Escuque, the capital of the municipality.

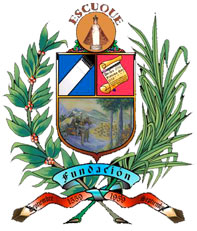
- Flag Seal

- Location in Trujillo

- Location in Venezuela
- Coordinates: 9°15′N 70°45′W
- Country: Venezuela
- State: Trujillo
- Municipal seat: Escuque

Government
  - Mayor: Ely Abreu Durán

Area
  - Total: 165 km^{2} (64 sq mi)

Population (2017)
  - Total: 32,901
  - Density: 199/km^{2} (516/sq mi)
- Time zone: UTC−4 (VET)

Escuque is one of the 20 municipalities of the state of Trujillo, Venezuela. The municipality occupies an area of 165 km^{2} with a population of 32,901 inhabitants according to the 2017 census.

== Towns ==
Parish	Population	Capital
Escuque	11,922	Escuque
La Unión	2,276	El Alto de Escuque
Sabana Libre	4,836	Sabana Libre
Santa Rita	1,762	La Mata
