= Candelaria Municipality, Trujillo =

Candelaria Municipality Municipio Candelaria
- Municipality
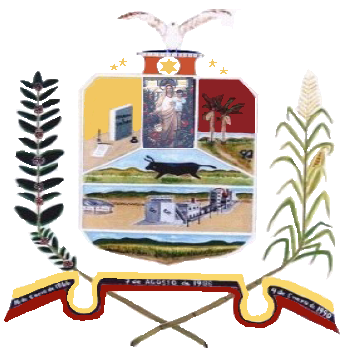
- Flag Seal

- Location in Trujillo

- Location in Venezuela
- Coordinates: 9°37′05″N 70°21′26″W
- Country: Venezuela
- State: Trujillo
- Established: 6 August 1988
- Municipal seat: Chejendé

Government
  - Mayor: Carmen Elena Benítez (PSUV)

Area
  - Total: 411 km^{2} (159 sq mi)

Population (2011)
  - Total: 27,811
  - Density: 67.7/km^{2} (175/sq mi)
- Time zone: UTC−4 (VET)

Candelaria is one of the 20 municipalities of the state of Trujillo, Venezuela. The municipality occupies an area of 411 km^{2} with a population of 27,811 inhabitants according to the 2011 census.

== Parishes ==
The municipality consists of the following seven parishes, with their capitals listed in parentheses:

- Arnoldo Gabaldón (Minas)
- Bolivia (Bolivia)
- Carrillo (Torococo)
- Cegarra (Mitón)
- Chejendé (Chejendé)
- Manuel Salvador Ulloa (Sabana Grande)
- San José (Las Llanadas)
