= Pampanito Municipality =

Pampanito Municipality Municipio Pampanito
- Municipality
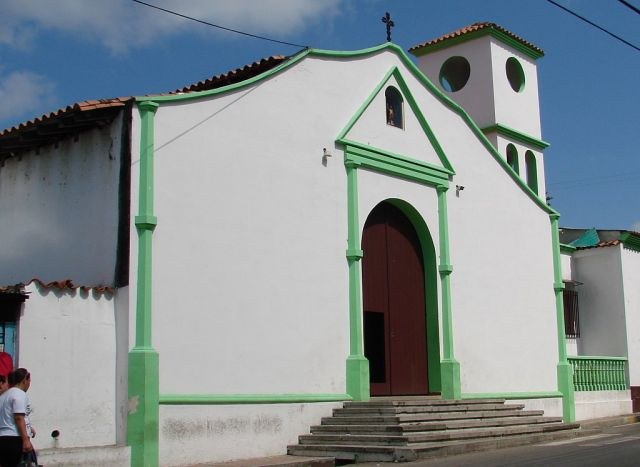
- The church of St. John the Baptist located in Pampanito

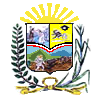
- Flag Seal

- Location in Trujillo

- Location in Venezuela
- Coordinates: 9°24′41″N 70°29′45″W
- Country: Venezuela
- State: Trujillo
- Municipal seat: Pampanito

Government
  - Mayor: Leonel Ruiz (PSUV)

Area
  - Total: 93 km^{2} (36 sq mi)
- Elevation: 100–800 m (330–2,620 ft)

Population (2011)
  - Total: 31,836
  - Density: 340/km^{2} (890/sq mi)
- Time zone: UTC−4 (VET)

Pampanito is one of the 20 municipalities of the state of Trujillo, Venezuela. The municipality occupies an area of 93 km^{2} with a population of 31,836 inhabitants according to the 2011 census.

== Parishes ==
The municipality consists of the following two parishes:

- La Concepción (Pampanito)
- Pampanito
- Pampanito II
