= Andrés Bello Municipality, Trujillo =

Andrés Bello Municipality Municipio Andrés Bello
- Municipality
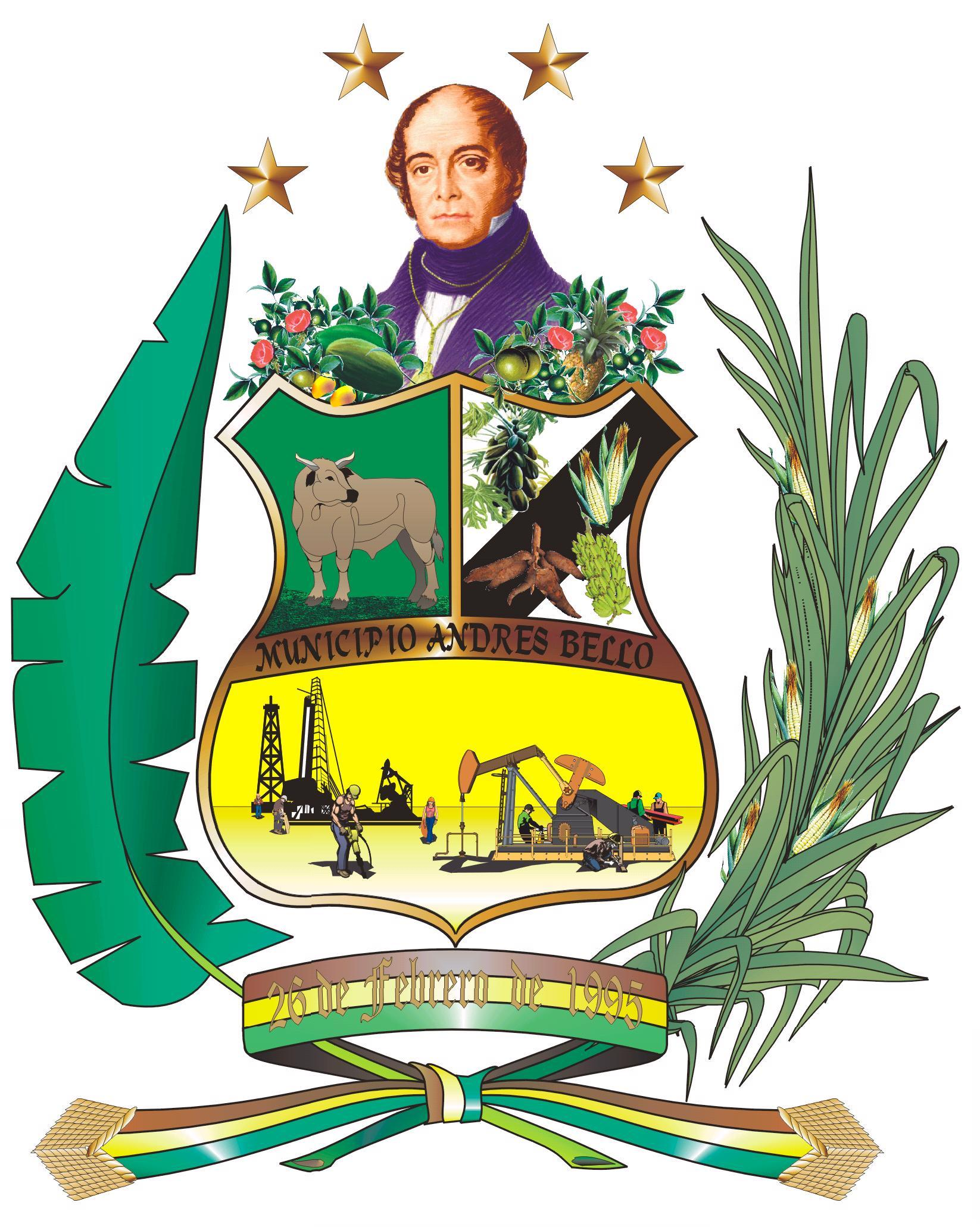
- Flag Seal

- Location in Trujillo

- Location in Venezuela
- Coordinates: 9°39′51″N 70°44′18″W
- Country: Venezuela
- State: Trujillo
- Established: 30 January 1995
- Municipal seat: Santa Isabel

Government
  - Mayor: José Reyes Carvajal (PSUV)

Area
  - Total: 202 km^{2} (78 sq mi)
- Elevation: 30 m (98 ft)

Population (2011)
  - Total: 18,879
  - Density: 93.5/km^{2} (242/sq mi)
- Time zone: UTC−4 (VET)

Andrés Bello is one of the 20 municipalities of the state of Trujillo, Venezuela. The municipality occupies an area of 202 km^{2} with a population of 18,879 inhabitants according to the 2011 census.

== Parishes ==
The municipality consists of the following four parishes:

- Araguaney
- El Jaguito
- La Esperanza
- Santa Isabel
