= José Felipe Márquez Cañizales Municipality =

José Felipe Márquez Cañizales Municipality Municipio José Felipe Márquez Cañizales
- Municipality
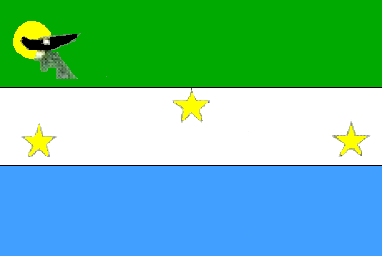
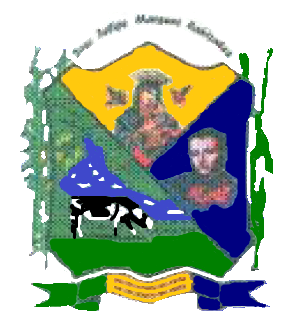
- Flag Seal

- Location in Trujillo

- Location in Venezuela
- Coordinates: 10°23′05″N 63°46′26″W
- Country: Venezuela
- State: Trujillo
- Established: January 1995
- Municipal seat: El Paradero

Government
  - Mayor: Cervando Godoy Godoy ((AD))

Area
  - Total: 648 km^{2} (250 sq mi)
- Elevation: 217 m (712 ft)

Population (2011)
  - Total: 6,492
  - Density: 10.0/km^{2} (25.9/sq mi)
- Time zone: UTC−4 (VET)

José Felipe Márquez Cañizales is one of the 20 municipalities of the state of Trujillo, Venezuela. The municipality occupies an area of 648 km^{2} (250 sq mi) with a population of 6,492 inhabitants according to the 2011 census.

== Parishes ==
The municipality consists of the following three parishes, with the seat of each in parentheses:

- Antonio José de Sucre (La Placita);
- El Socorro (El Paradero);
- Los Caprichos (Los Caprichos)
