= Rafael Rangel Municipality =

Rafael Rangel Municipality Municipio Rafael Rangel
- Municipality
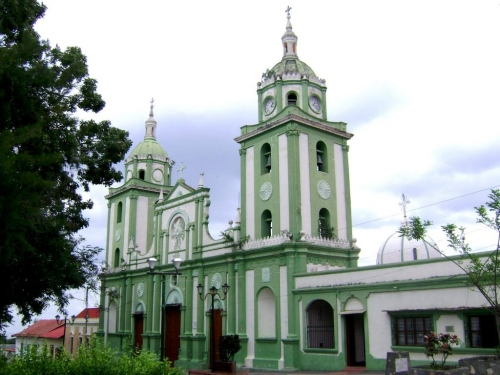
- The Saint-Jean-Baptiste church in Betijoque

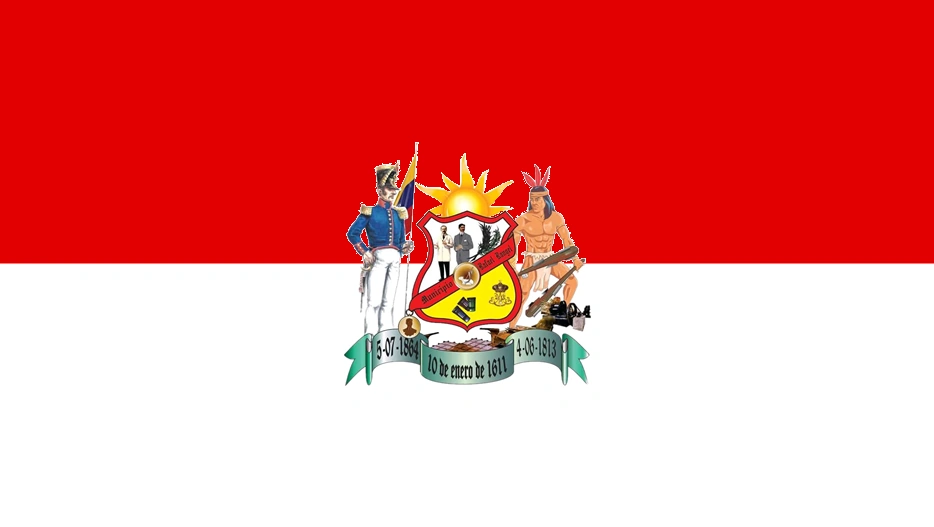
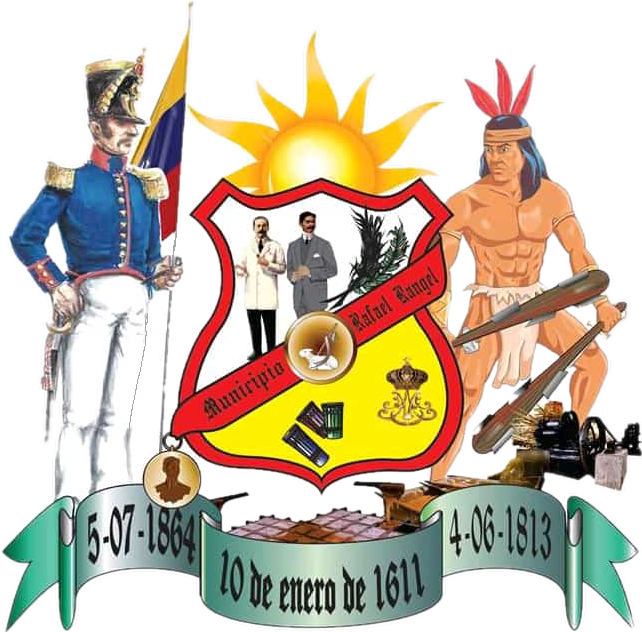
- Flag Seal

- Location in Trujillo

- Location in Venezuela
- Coordinates: 9°22′54″N 70°44′03″W
- Country: Venezuela
- State: Trujillo
- Municipal seat: Betijoque

Government
  - Mayor: Sonia Silva Pineda (PSUV)

Area
  - Total: 120 km^{2} (46 sq mi)
- Elevation: 122 m (400 ft)

Population (2011)
  - Total: 22,153
  - Density: 180/km^{2} (480/sq mi)
- Time zone: UTC−4 (VET)

Rafael Rangel is one of the 20 municipalities of the state of Trujillo, Venezuela. The municipality occupies an area of 120 km^{2} with a population of 22,153 inhabitants according to the 2011 census. Its shire town is Betijoque.

== Parishes ==
The municipality consists of the following four parishes:

- Betijoque
- José Gregorio Hernández
- La Pueblita
- Los Cedros
