= Trujillo Municipality =

Trujillo Municipality Municipio Trujillo
- Municipality
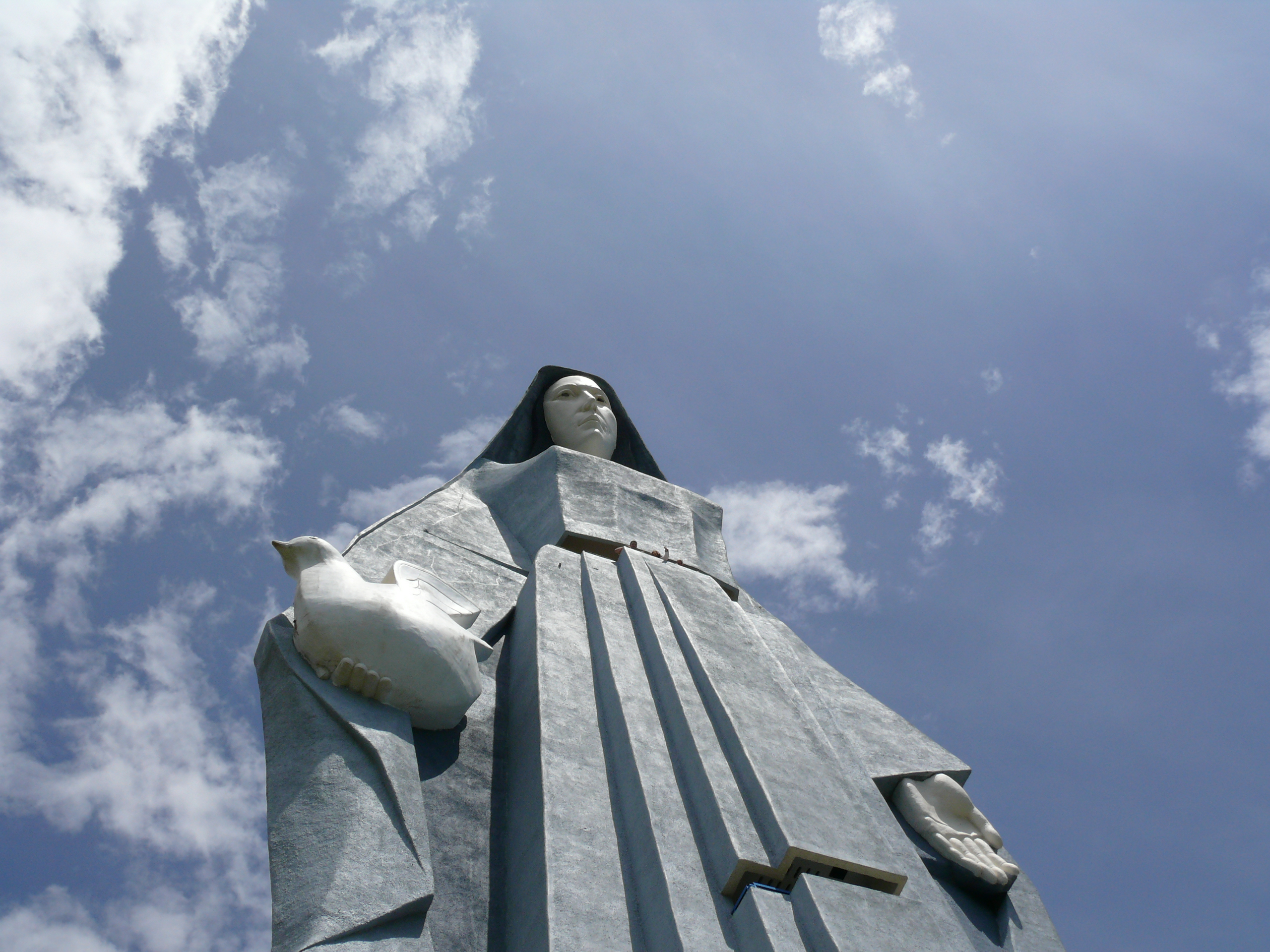

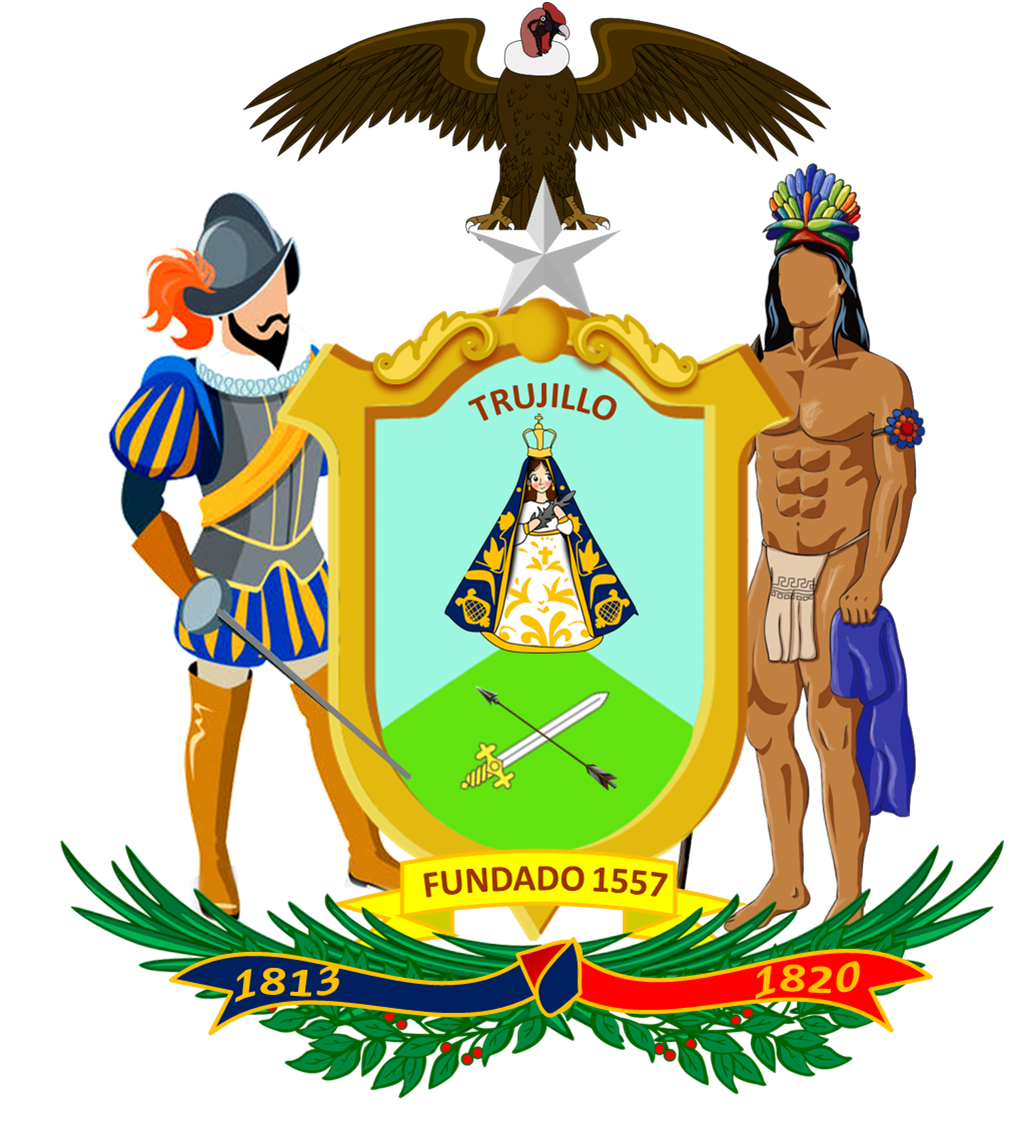
- Flag Seal

- Location in Trujillo

- Location in Venezuela
- Coordinates: 9°22′00″N 70°25′59″W
- Country: Venezuela
- State: Trujillo
- Municipal seat: Trujillo

Government
  - Mayor: Carlos Terán Montilla (PSUV)

Population (2011)
  - Total: 54,213
- Time zone: UTC−4 (VET)

Trujillo is one of the 20 municipalities (municipios) that makes up the Venezuelan state of Trujillo and, according to a 2011 population estimate by the National Institute of Statistics of Venezuela, the municipality has a population of 54,213. The city of Trujillo is the municipal seat of Trujillo Municipality.
