= Pampán Municipality =

Pampán Municipality Municipio Pampán
- Municipality
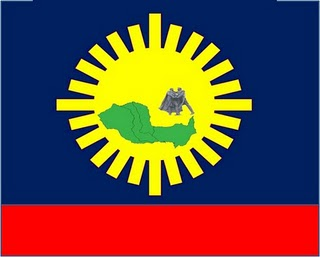
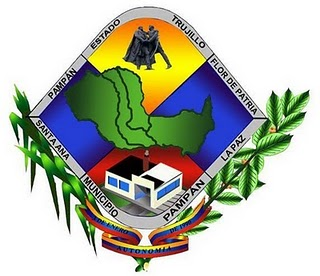
- Flag Seal

- Location in Trujillo
- Coordinates: 9°27′04″N 70°28′33″W
- Country: Venezuela
- State: Trujillo
- Established: October 2001
- Municipal seat: Pampán

Government
  - Mayor: Manuel Peña Aguilar (PSUV)

Area
  - Total: 431 km^{2} (166 sq mi)
- Elevation: 973 m (3,192 ft)

Population (2011)
  - Total: 47,549
  - Density: 110/km^{2} (286/sq mi)
- Time zone: UTC−4 (VET)
- Website: Official website

Pampán is one of the twenty municipalities of the state of Trujillo, Venezuela. The municipality occupies an area of 431 km^{2} with a population of 47,549 inhabitants according to the 2011 census.

The municipality consists of the following 4 towns:

- Pampán
- Flor de Patria
- La Paz
- Santa Ana
