= Trujillo, Trujillo =

Trujillo
- Nuestra Señora de la Paz de Trujillo
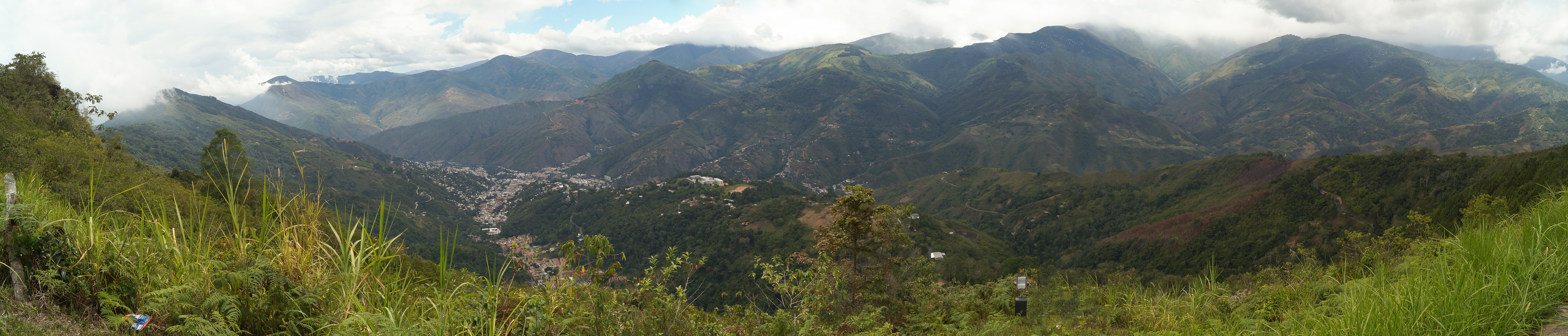
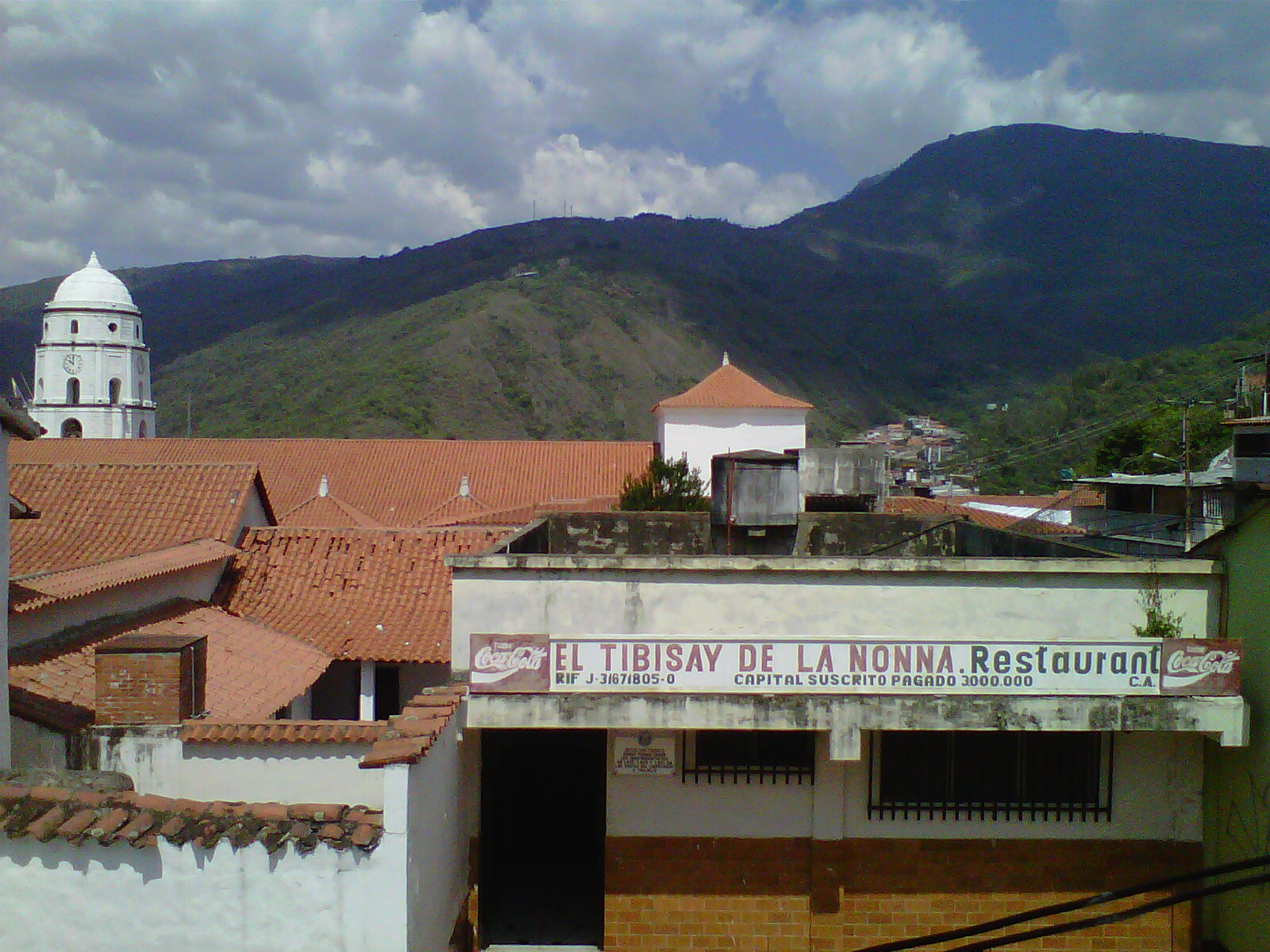
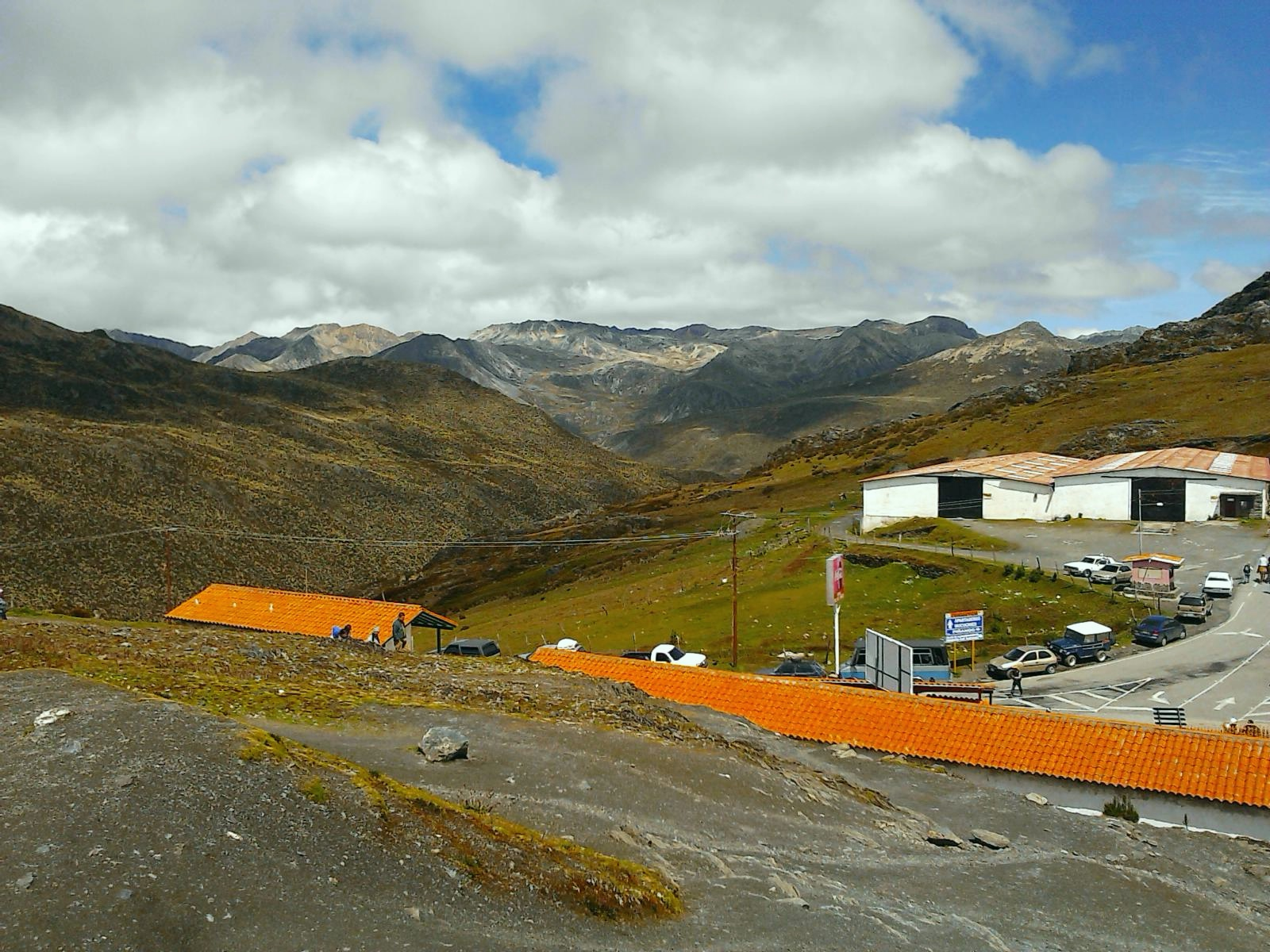
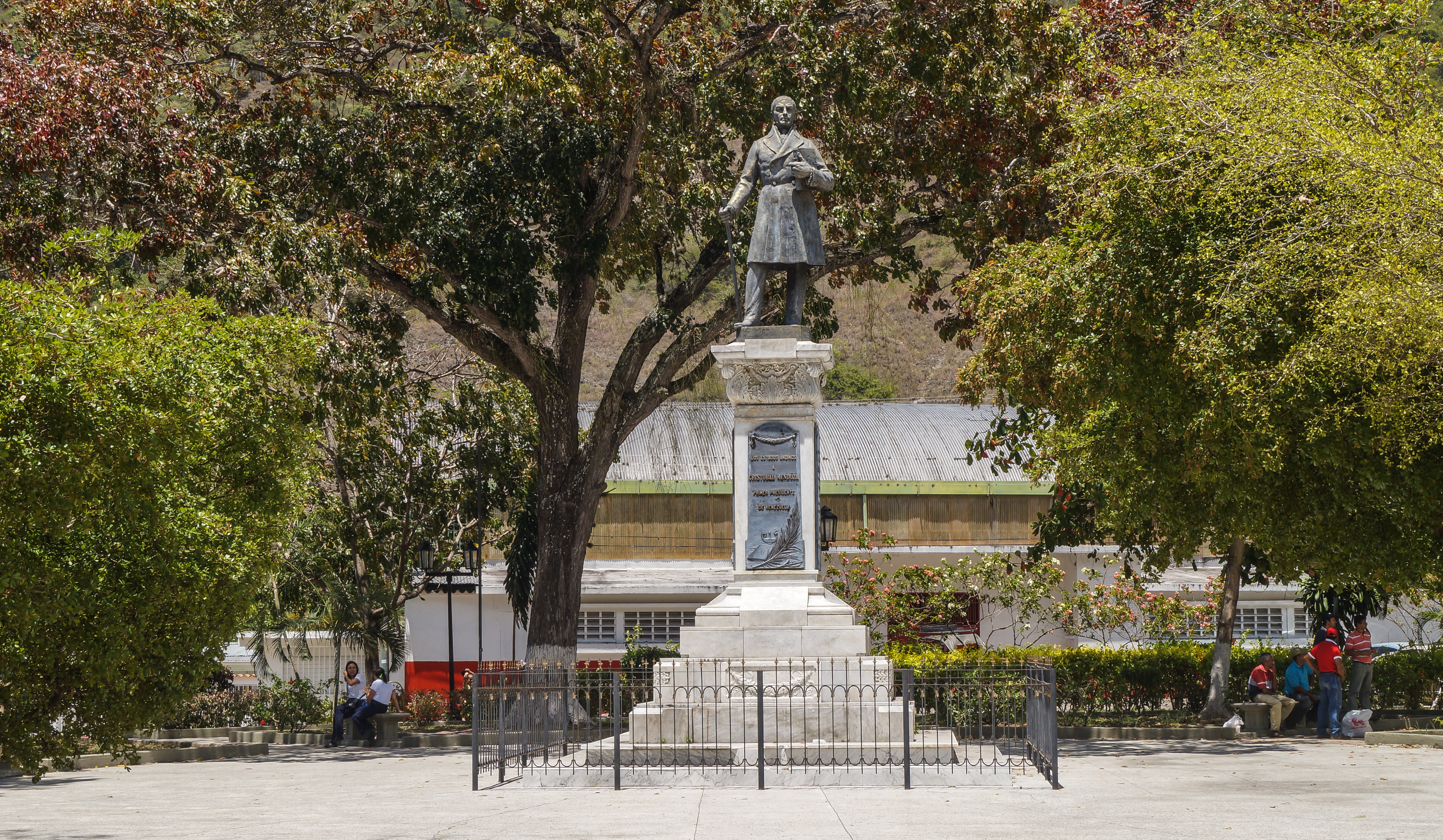
- Top:Panoramic view of Trujillo, from La Paz Monument, Second:Panoramic view of Trujillo and Trujillo Cathedral, Gonzalico Hills, (Cerro de Gonzalico), Bottom:Cristobal Mendoza Square (Plaza Cristobal de Mendoza) (all items were left to right)

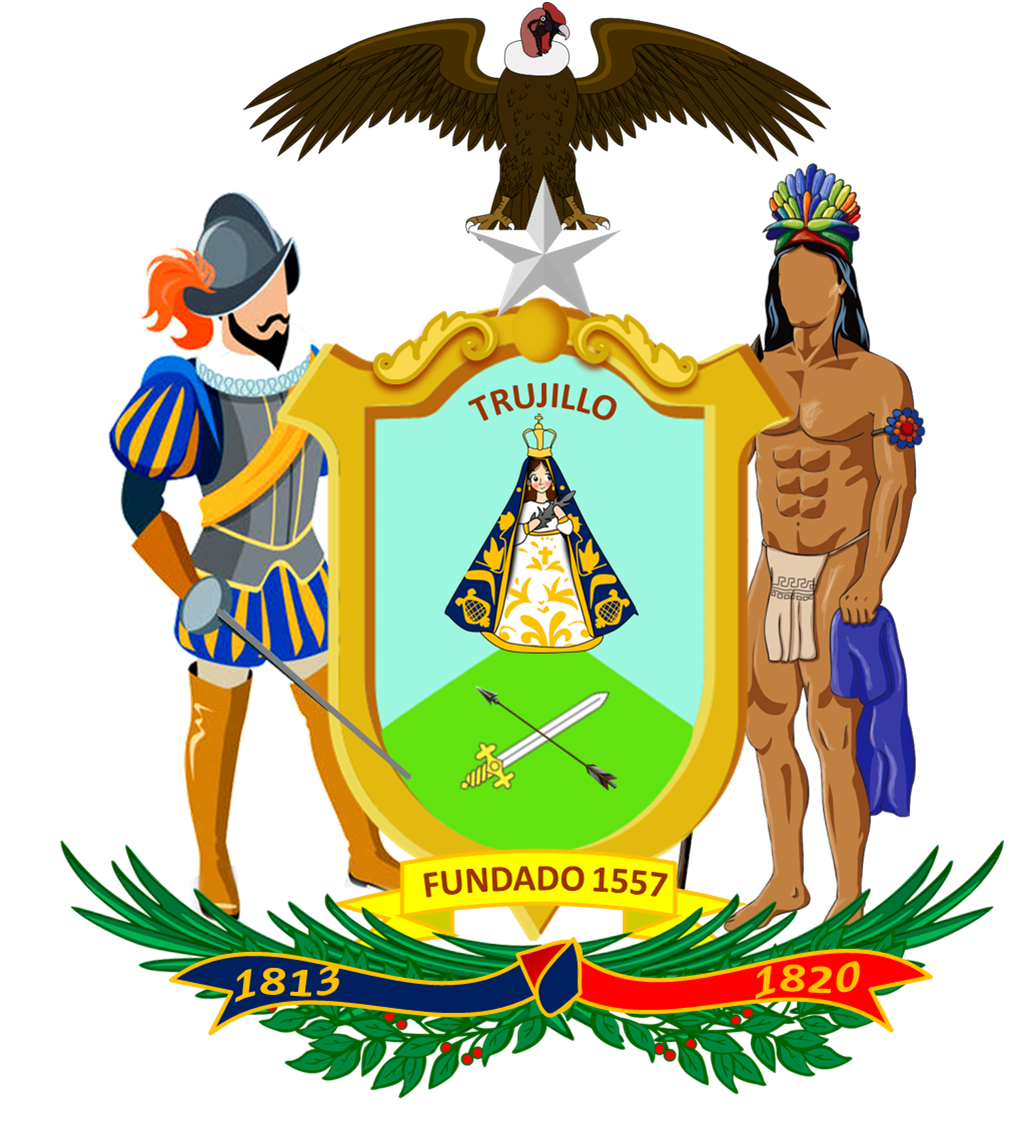
- Coat of arms

- Location within Venezuela
- Coordinates: 09°22′00″N 70°25′59″W
- Country: Venezuela
- State: Trujillo
- Municipality: Trujillo
- Founded: 9 October 1557
- Elevation: 1,400 m (4,600 ft)

Population
  - Total: 110,920
  - Density: 92.28/km^{2} (239.0/sq mi)
  - Demonym: Trujillano(a)
- Time zone: UTC−4 (VET)
- Postal code: 3150
- Area code: 0272
- Climate: Aw
- Website: Alcaldía de Trujillo (in Spanish)

Trujillo is the capital city of Trujillo State in Venezuela. About 40,000 people live in this city, located in El Valle de Los Mukas.

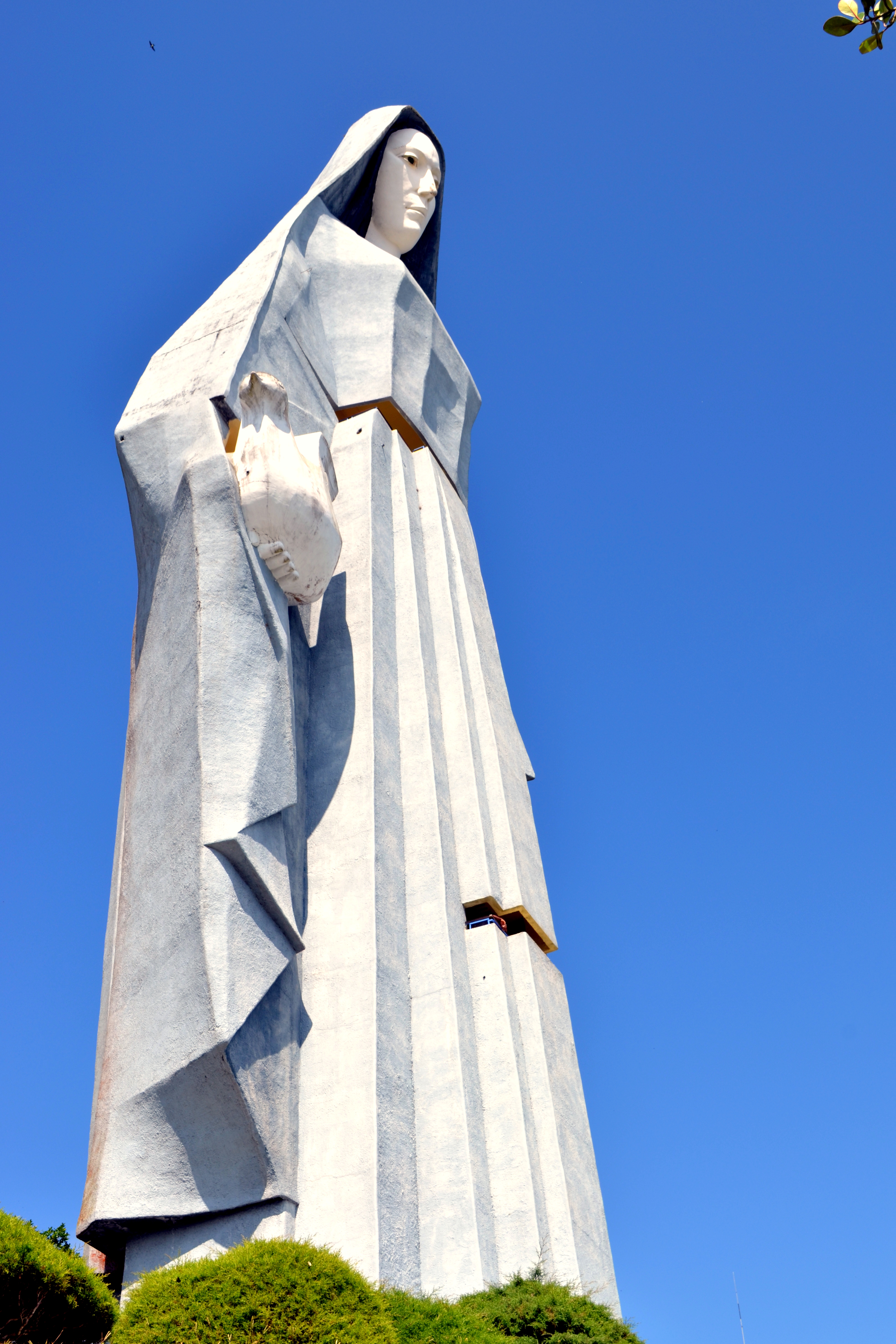
La Virgen de la Paz Monument in Trujillo, the tallest statue in South America.

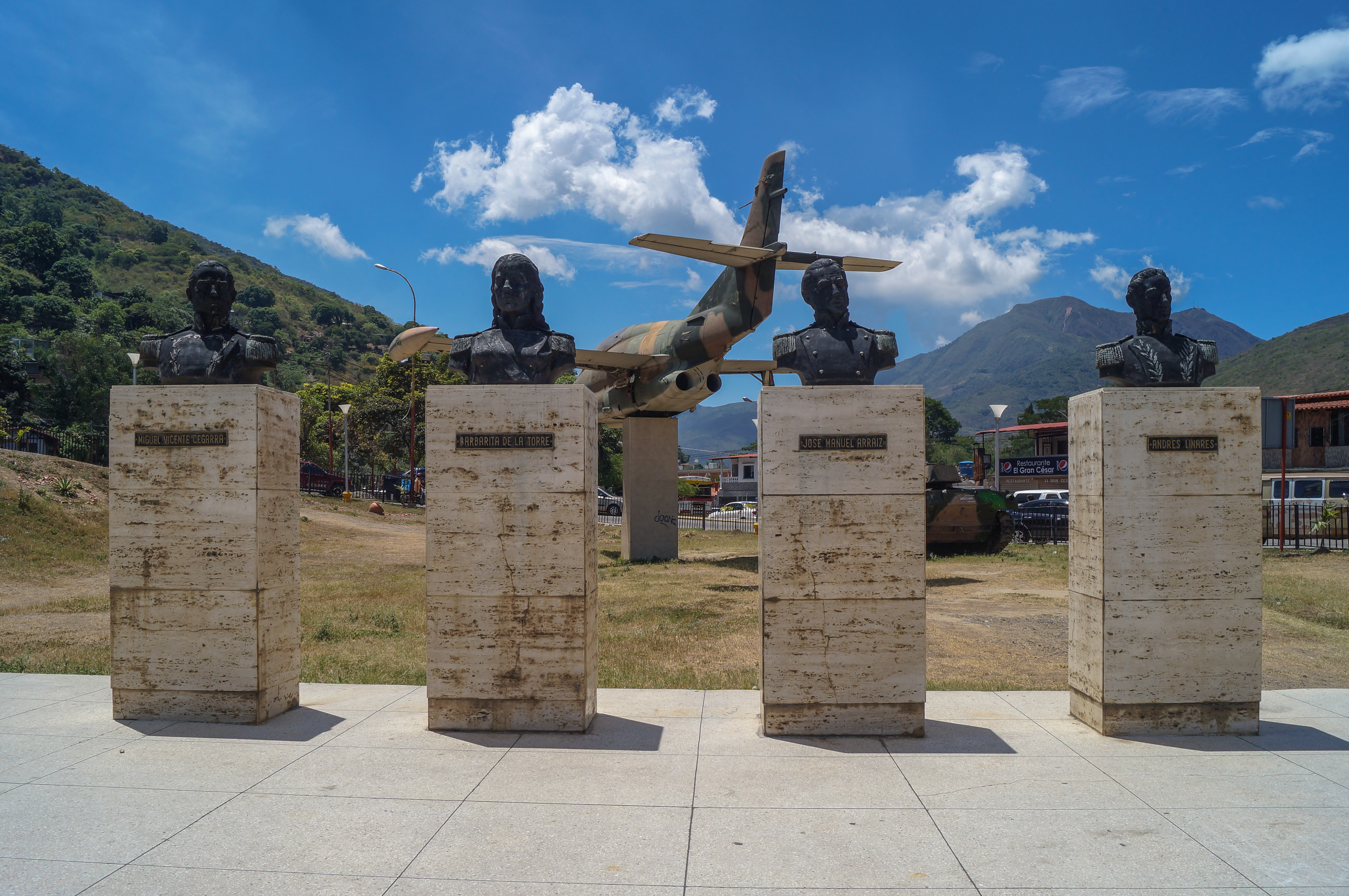
Monument of Trujillenses Heroes.

== History ==
Founded by one of the "Conquistadores de America", Diego García de Paredes (1506–1563), son of Diego García de Paredes (the father), (1466–1534), Spanish soldier and duellist, native of Trujillo in Extremadura, Spain.

In 1678, Trujillo was the farthest point in a daring raid on Spanish-held Venezuela, carried out by six pirate ships and 700 men led by the French buccaneer Michel de Grammont.

Simon Bolívar promulgated the Decree of War to the Death in the city on 15 June 1813.

== Notable people ==
- Yoel Daboín (born 2004) - footballer
