= San Rafael de Carvajal Municipality =

San Rafael de Carvajal Municipality Municipio San Rafael de Carvajal
- Municipality
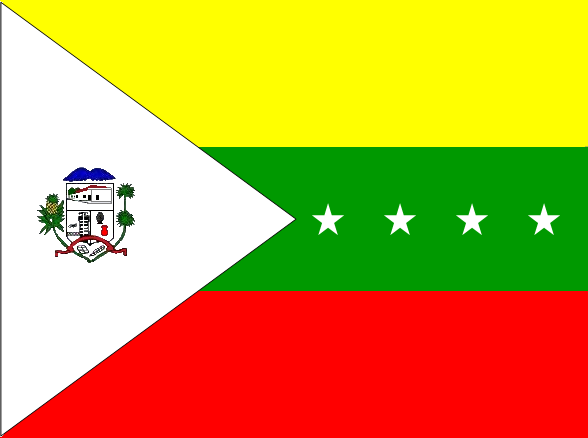
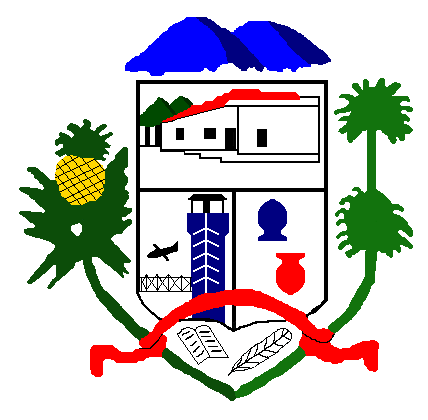
- Flag Seal

- Location in Trujillo

- Location in Venezuela
- Coordinates: 9°19′48″N 70°34′36″W
- Country: Venezuela
- State: Trujillo
- Municipal seat: Carvajal

Government
  - Mayor: Milexi Albarrán Daboin (PSUV)

Area
  - Total: 77 km^{2} (30 sq mi)
- Elevation: 700 m (2,300 ft)

Population (2011)
  - Total: 58,863
  - Density: 760/km^{2} (2,000/sq mi)
- Time zone: UTC−4 (VET)

San Rafael de Carvajal is one of the 20 municipalities of the state of Trujillo, Venezuela. The municipality occupies an area of 77 km^{2} with a population of 58,863 inhabitants according to the 2011 census.

== Parishes ==
The municipality consists of the following four parishes:

- Antonio Nicolás Briceño
- Campo Alegre
- Carvajal
- José Leonardo Suárez
