= Boconó =

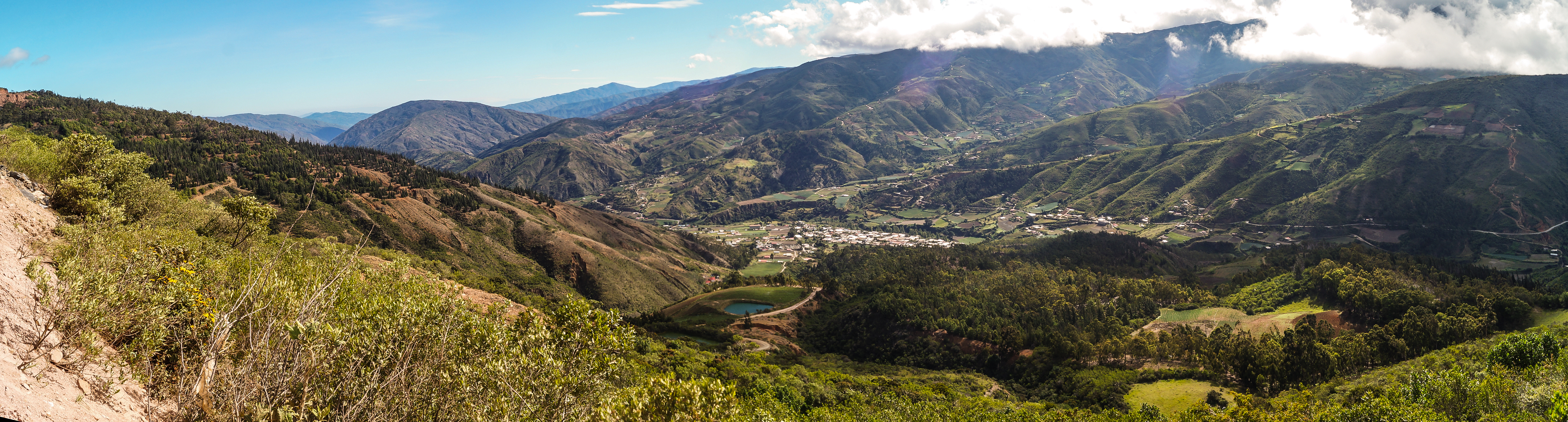

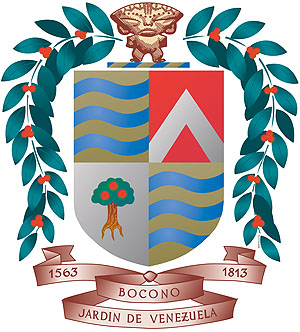
- Flag Coat of arms
- Nickname: "Jardín de Venezuela" (English: "Garden of Venezuela")
- Boconó Municipality in Trujillo State

- Location within Venezuela
- Coordinates: 09°41′00″N 70°45′00″W
- Country: Venezuela
- State: Trujillo
- Municipality: Boconó
- Founded: 1560

Government
  - Mayor: Alejandro García Castellano (PSUV)

Area
  - Total: 1,365 km^{2} (527 sq mi)
- Elevation: 1,225 m (4,019 ft)

Population (2001)
  - Total: 79,710
  - Density: 58.4/km^{2} (151/sq mi)
  - Demonym: Bocones
- Time zone: UTC-4:30 (VST)
  - Summer (DST): UTC-4:30 (not observed)
- Postal code: 3103
- Area code: 272
- Climate: Af
- Website: (in Spanish)
- Area and population figures are for the municipality

Boconó is a city in the Venezuelan Andean state of Trujillo. Founded in 1560, this city is the shire town of the Boconó Municipality and, according to the 2001 Venezuelan census, the municipality has a population of 79,710.

== History ==
Of native origin, the name Boconó comes from the word Komboc, the name of a local river. On October 12, 1548, Diego Ruiz de Vallejo left El Tocuyo, under orders of Juan Villegas, to conquer the Cuicas Province, a name that was given by the natives that inhabited the area and where the Boconó valley was located, with the objective of taking gold from the mines that were supposedly in the area.

In 1558, an argument between Francisco Ruiz, sent by the governor of the province of Venezuela to occupy the sector of los Cuicas, and Juan de Maldonado, representative of the Real Audiencia del Nuevo Reino de Granada, occurred; Juan de Maldonado alleged that his people controlled those lands. Nevertheless, the capable work of Ruiz guaranteed that those lands were under the jurisdiction of Venezuela.

In 1786, the Boconó Canton was formed.

In 1811, Boconó was declared a city and joined the independence movement. The Spanish Empire reacted by imprisoning and exiling Don Miguel Uzcátegui, Mayor of the city.

On two occasions (June 26–29, 1813 and March 10, 1821), Simón Bolívar visited Boconó, where he installed a base at Boca del Monte. While in Boconó, he stayed at the house of Mayor Jose María Baptista, expressed his admiration of the region, and declared the city "Garden of Venezuela".

On July 2, 1813, the Battle Niquitao in the Tirindí savanna took place, an event that occurred during the Admirable Campaign. Residents, the Mucuchíes tribe, and numerous patriots together with José Félix Ribas, Vicente Campo Elías, and Rafael Urdaneta defeated the Spanish Army commanded by José Martí.

In 1864, the Boconó Department was formed.

In 1884, the Boconó Department became the Boconó District.

In 1955, the Boconó Airport was completed and, on September 3 of that year, the first planes began landing at the new airport.

In 1990, the Boconó District became the Boconó Municipality. The municipality was originally divided into 13 parishes (Ayacucho, Boconó, Burbusay, Campo Elías, El Carmen, General Ribas, Guaramacal, Monseñor Jáuregui, Mosquey, Rafael Rangel, San José, San Miguel, and Vega de Guaramacal); Campo Elías separated to form its own municipality on January 30, 1995.

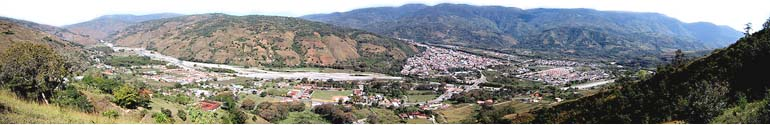

== Demographics ==
The Boconó Municipality, according to the 2001 Venezuelan census, has a population of 79,710 (up from 70,102 in 1990). This amounts to 13.1% of Trujillo's population. The municipality's population density is 151.3 people per square mile (58.40/km^{2}).

== Government ==
Boconó is the shire town of the Boconó Municipality in Trujillo. The municipality is divided into 12 parishes (Ayacucho, Boconó, Burbusay, El Carmen, General Ribas, Guaramacal, Monseñor Jáuregui, Mosquey, Rafael Rangel, San José, San Miguel, and Vega de Guaramacal). The mayor of the Boconó Municipality is Kevin Justo (formerly President of the Municipal Council) after the death of Mayor Luis Hidalgo as a result of COVID-19 The last municipal election was held on December 10, 2017.
