= Trujillo (state) =

Coordinates: 9.417°N 70.500°W

- State of Venezuela
- Flag Coat of arms
- Anthem: Himno del Estado Trujillo
- Location within Venezuela
- Country: Venezuela
- Created: 1899
- Capital: Trujillo
- Largest city: Valera

Government
  - Body: Legislative Council
  - Governor: Gerardo Márquez

Area
  - Total: 7,198 km^{2} (2,779 sq mi)
  - Rank: 18th
- 0.81% of Venezuela

Population (2011 census est.)
  - Total: 686,367
  - Rank: 17th
- 2.58% of Venezuela
- Time zone: UTC−4 (VET)
- ISO 3166 code: VE-T
- Emblematic tree: Bucare anauco (Erythrina fusca)
- HDI (2019): 0.680 medium · 18th of 24
- Website: www.gbet.gov.ve

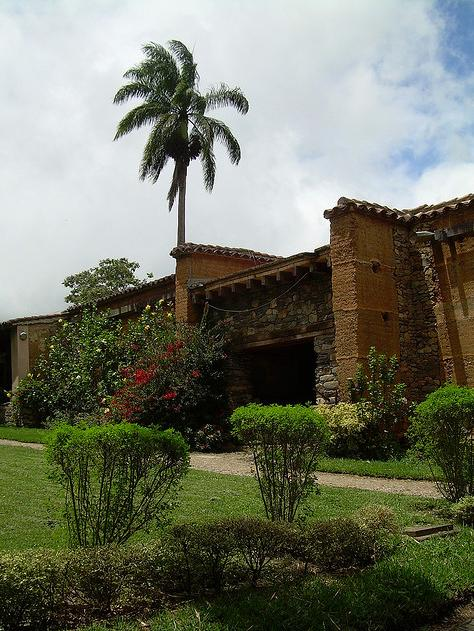
Old sugar plantation in Trujillo

Trujillo State (Spanish: Estado Trujillo, Spanish pronunciation: [esˈtaðo tɾuˈxiʝo]) is one of the 23 states of Venezuela. Its capital is Trujillo and the largest city is Valera. The state is divided into 20 municipalities and 93 parishes. Trujillo State covers a total surface area of 7,198 km^{2} (2,779 sq mi) and, has a 2011 census population of 686,367.

== History ==
=== Spanish colonization ===
The city of Trujillo was founded in 1557 by the conquistador and captain Diego García de Paredes, in honor of his homonymous and native town located in Extremadura, Spain. Hostility from the Kuikas Indians and natural calamities forced changes in settlement, but on 27 October 1570 the town was finally located under the temporary name of Trujillo de Nuestra Señora de la Paz. It is also known as the Portable City because of its many foundations due to the fierce resistance of the indigenous people who inhabited that territory when defending their lands.

On 31 December 1676, Maracaibo (separated from the province of Venezuela) and Mérida-La Grita are united in a government, which includes in its territory the current state of Trujillo, called the Province of Mérida del Espíritu Santo of Maracaibo (capital in Mérida) dependent on the Audiencia of Bogotá.

In 1677 the French pirate Michel de Grandmont sacked the city of Trujillo after subduing Maracaibo and Gibraltar on the eastern shore of Lake Maracaibo. In 1678 Governor Jorge de Madureira moves the capital from Merida to Maracaibo and changes the name to Province of Maracaibo.

On September 8, 1777, King Carlos III created the Captaincy General of Venezuela by Royal Decree, adding the surrounding provinces to his jurisdiction "in the governmental and military field" and ordering the governors of those provinces to "obey" the Captain General and "carry out his orders". The provinces of Cumaná, Maracaibo, Guayana, Trinidad and Margarita are separated from the viceroyalty of New Granada and united with the province of Venezuela. In addition, those of Maracaibo and Guayana pass from the jurisdiction of the Audiencia of Bogotá to that of Santo Domingo, to which the others already belong.

It was part of the Province of Caracas until 1786, when it became an integral part of the Province of Maracaibo. A Royal Decree of February 15, 1786, ordered the transfer of the city of Trujillo from the governorship of Caracas to that of Maracaibo. The same document separated the city of Barinas from Maracaibo, choosing it as a separate province.

=== 19th and 20th centuries ===
In 1810 the city and district of Trujillo separated from the Province of Maracaibo to create a new province, which would be a signatory of the Venezuelan Independence Act in 1811.

On June 15, 1813, Simón Bolívar, the Liberator, signs in the town of Trujillo at 3:00 am the Decree of War to Death against the Spaniards and the Canaries until they were granted freedom, which makes Trujillo a very important city in the history and the War of Independence of Venezuela.

On July 2, 1813, the patriots, under the command of Colonel José Félix Ribas, defeated the royalists in the battle of Niquitao in the framework of the Admirable Campaign.

On November 27, 1820, in the town of Santa Ana de Trujillo, Simón Bolívar and Captain General Pablo Morillo sign the Treaty of Armistice and Regularization of the War. By means of these treaties the war to death was officially repealed, a truce of six months was agreed in addition to constituting a de facto recognition of the Great Colombia by the crown of Spain.

When Venezuela separated from Gran Colombia in 1830, the Department of Zulia was renamed the Province of Maracaibo. The provinces of Merida and Coro were immediately separated, leaving the province composed only of the sections Zulia and Trujillo.

In 1831 the province of Trujillo was constituted by separating from the province of Maracaibo which was composed only of the Zulia section. The state of Trujillo was created in 1863, as it would be during the government of Juan Vicente Gómez, when he created more states after being diminished by Cipriano Castro.

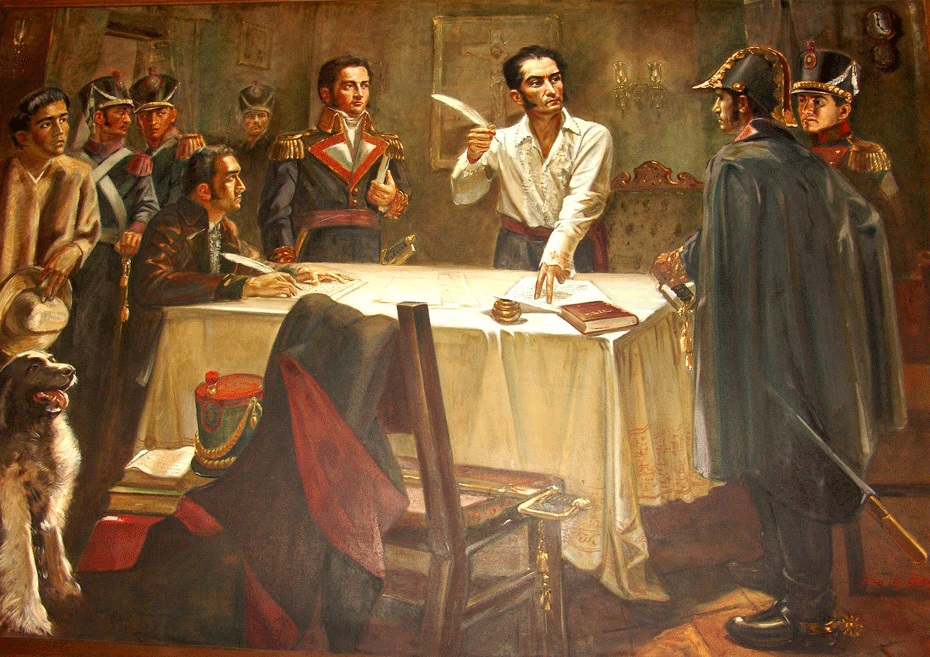
General Simón Bolívar signing the decree of War to Death against Spanish Empire during the War of Independence in Trujillo, 1813

Between 1859 and 1864, during the Federal War, the state was strangely divided into two factions, the conservatives of Jajó and the liberals of Santiago. In 1863 the state was created as Trujillo, formed by the former province of Trujillo that had been created in 1810, with the territory that had been assigned to it in 1856: Trujillo, Escuque, Boconó and Carache. In that same year it was called the Sovereign State of Los Andes; but the Constitution of 1864 recognizes it as the state of Trujillo. In 1881 it is part, together with Mérida and Táchira, of the Great State of Los Andes.

In 1887, the port of La Ceiba became very important when the Gran Ferrocarril La Ceiba-Sabana de Mendoza began operations and later in 1895 it was extended to Motatán. In 1898, it was separated and organized again as Trujillo State, giving itself a new Constitution in 1899; with this denomination it has continued until today.

The railway line begins to lose importance in 1925 with the inauguration of the Trasandina Highway, as well as the progressive decrease of coffee production in Venezuela. In the era of President Juan Vicente Gómez, the population of Trujillo was almost entirely foreign and commercial, but after its fall, its cultural development began. The Ateneo de Trujillo (Kuikas complex) is an example, little by little this population became a city and capital of the state. Among other towns, the most important are Boconó and Valera, both of which are great tourist attractions.

== Geography ==
The state of Trujillo is mainly mountainous as it is crossed from southwest to northeast by the Andes mountain range, although it also has hills and plains.

The Andes Mountains are divided here into three branches, these are separated by the Motatan and Boconó valleys. The highlight of the state is the 4,006 m Teta de Niquitao. The plains are the Sabanas de Monay and the plains of El Cenizo. The shores that border Lake Maracaibo are swampy. Trujillo State is the smallest of the Andean states, and the one with the lowest absolute population as well, although its density is higher than Merida State. It is located in western Venezuela.

=== Limits ===
The boundaries of the state of Trujillo are:

- To the north, it borders the states of Zulia and Lara.
- To the South, it borders the states of Merida and Barinas.
- To the East, it borders the State of Portuguesa
- To the West, it borders on the State of Zulia and has coasts on the Lake of Maracaibo.

=== Relief ===
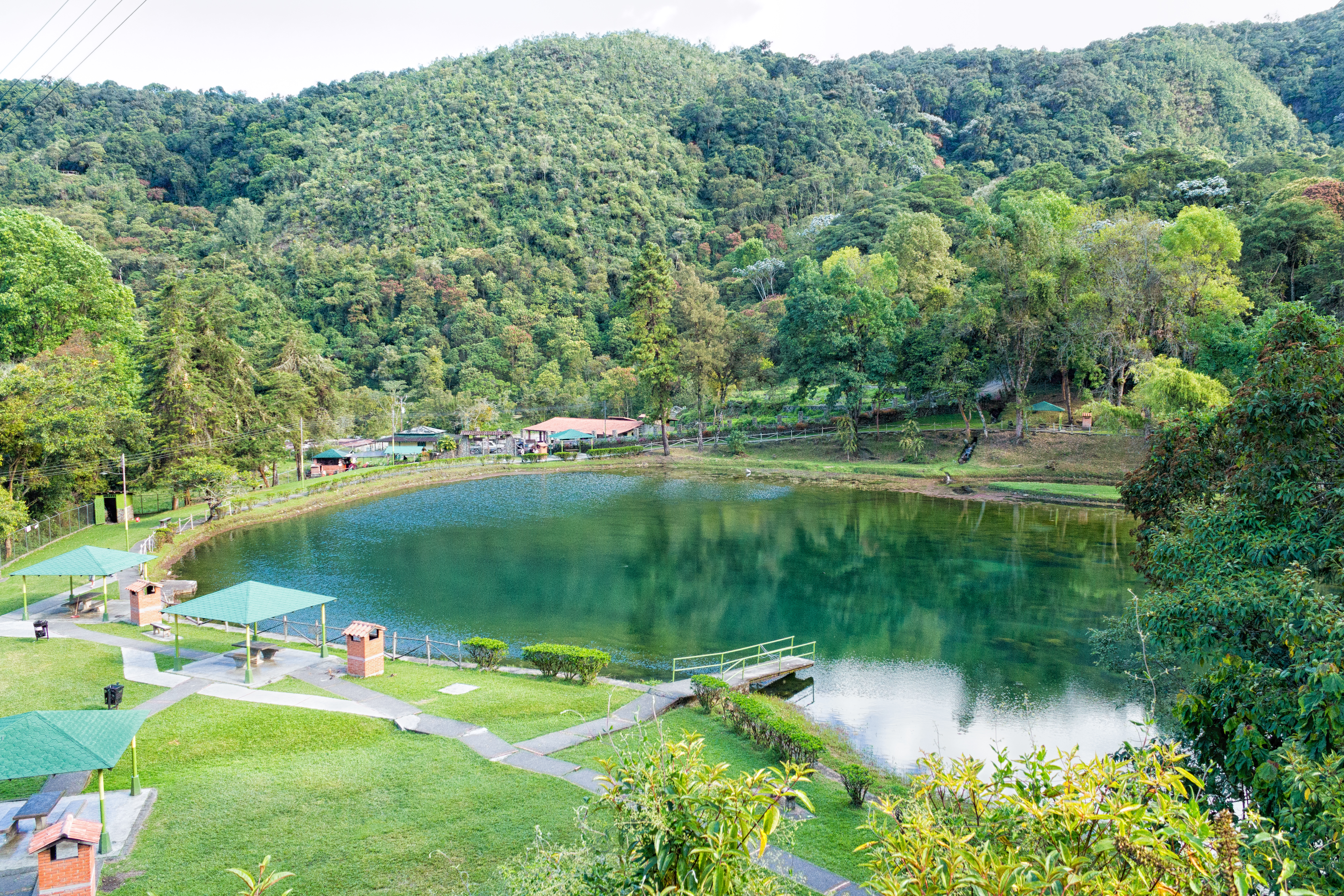
Los Cedros Lagoon, Trujillo State

The relief is rugged because it is located in the Venezuelan Andes (Sierra de Merida), which is part of the great Andes Mountains, although it has a vast flat region in the depression of Lake Maracaibo.

=== Climate ===
The climate is tropical mountainous, and the temperature can be between 20° and 10 °C approximately. However, there are areas such as Monay where the temperature can reach 32 °C and in the páramo area, such as the Riecito area at the border of the Urdaneta, Boconó, and Trujillo municipalities, where the average temperature drops to 4 °C. The relief favors the formation of a series of local climates, where the winds play a very important role, penetrating the state from the northeast, as well as from the east. The predominant climate in almost the entire state corresponds, according to Köeppen's classification, to a savanna climate (Aw), with an average annual temperature in the state capital of approximately 23.5 °C and rainfall of up to 936 mm per year. Soils Despite its traditionally agricultural character, the state of Trujillo has a limited amount of land suitable for agriculture. The presence of large mountain areas is a determining factor in this limitation. However, the State Management Plan states that 64.5% of the territory has good conditions for the implementation of a variety of agricultural production systems of a certain intensity, and that the remaining 35.5% is covered by natural protective vegetation. The development of an intensive agriculture must be subordinated to conservation practices of the resources involved, that is why three levels of preservation of lands with potential for agricultural activity are proposed: maximum, medium and low, expressing each one of them different degrees of flexibility in the defense of the soil resource.

=== Hydrography ===
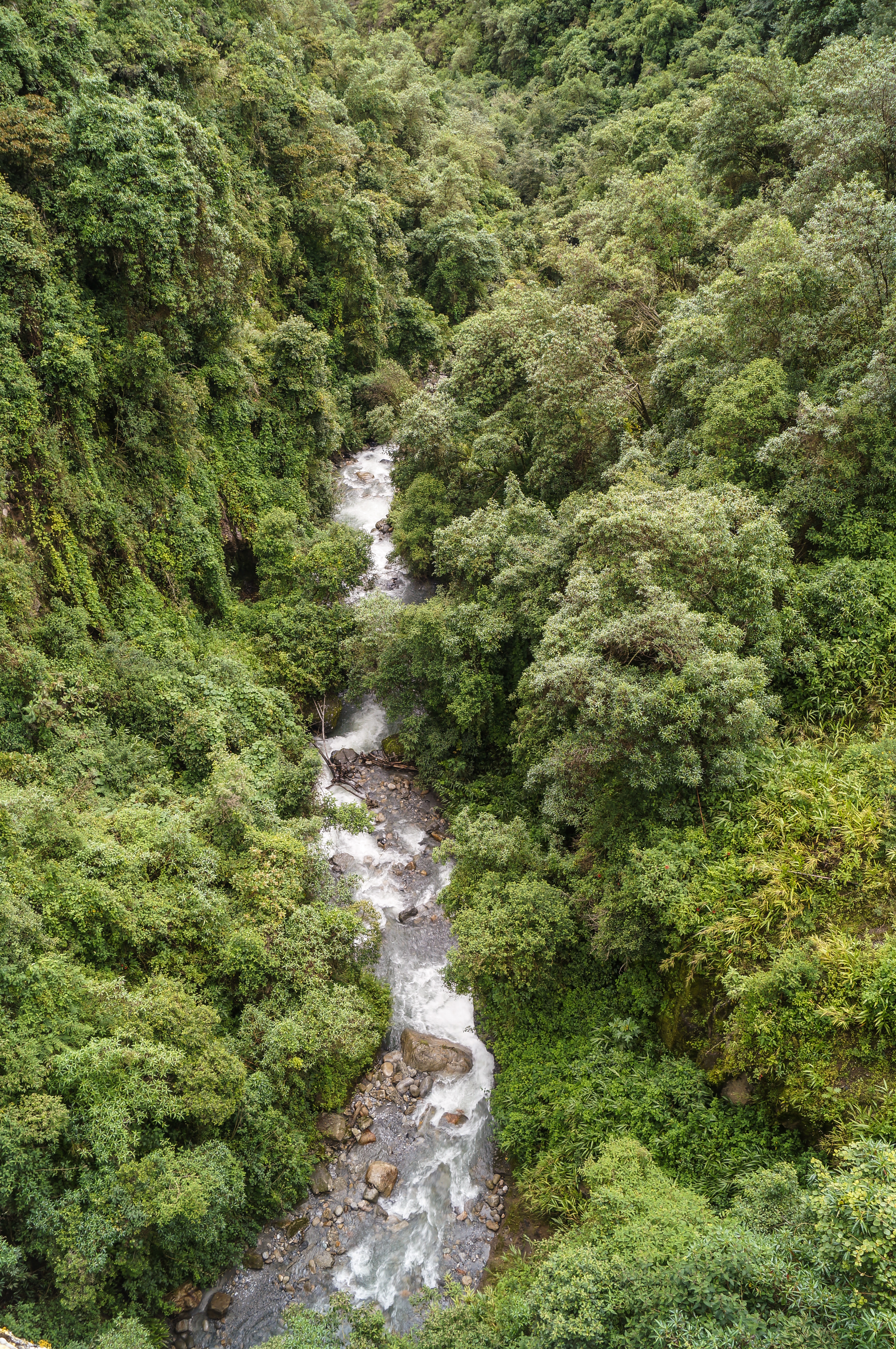
Burate River, Trujillo State

Rivers

- Motatan River
- Carache River
- Boconó River
- Burate River
- River Castan
- Jimenez River
- River Caus
- Rio Pocó
- Piedras Negras River
- Escuque River, known as the Quebrada de Escuque.

== Government and politics ==
Like other states, the structure of the government of Trujillo is laid out in the Constitution, the highest law in the state.

=== Executive Power ===
It is composed by the Governor of the State of Trujillo and a group of State Secretaries chosen by him to assist him in the government functions. The Governor is elected by the people through direct and secret vote for a period of four years and with the possibility of one or more reelections as of 2009 for an equal period, being in charge of the state administration.

Since 1989 the Governors are chosen in direct elections by the people, the current Trujillo Government is led by Henry Rangel Silva.

=== Legislative Power ===
The state legislature is the unicameral Legislative Council of the State of Trujillo, elected by the people through a universal, direct and secret vote every four years, with the possibility of being reelected for other consecutive periods, under a system of proportional representation of the population of the state and its municipalities. The state has 9 legislators, of which 1 belongs to the opposition (UNT) and 8 to the government (PSUV and UVE).

=== Trujillo Police ===
Like the other 23 federal entities of Venezuela, the State maintains its own police force, which is supported and complemented by the National Police and the Venezuelan National Guard.

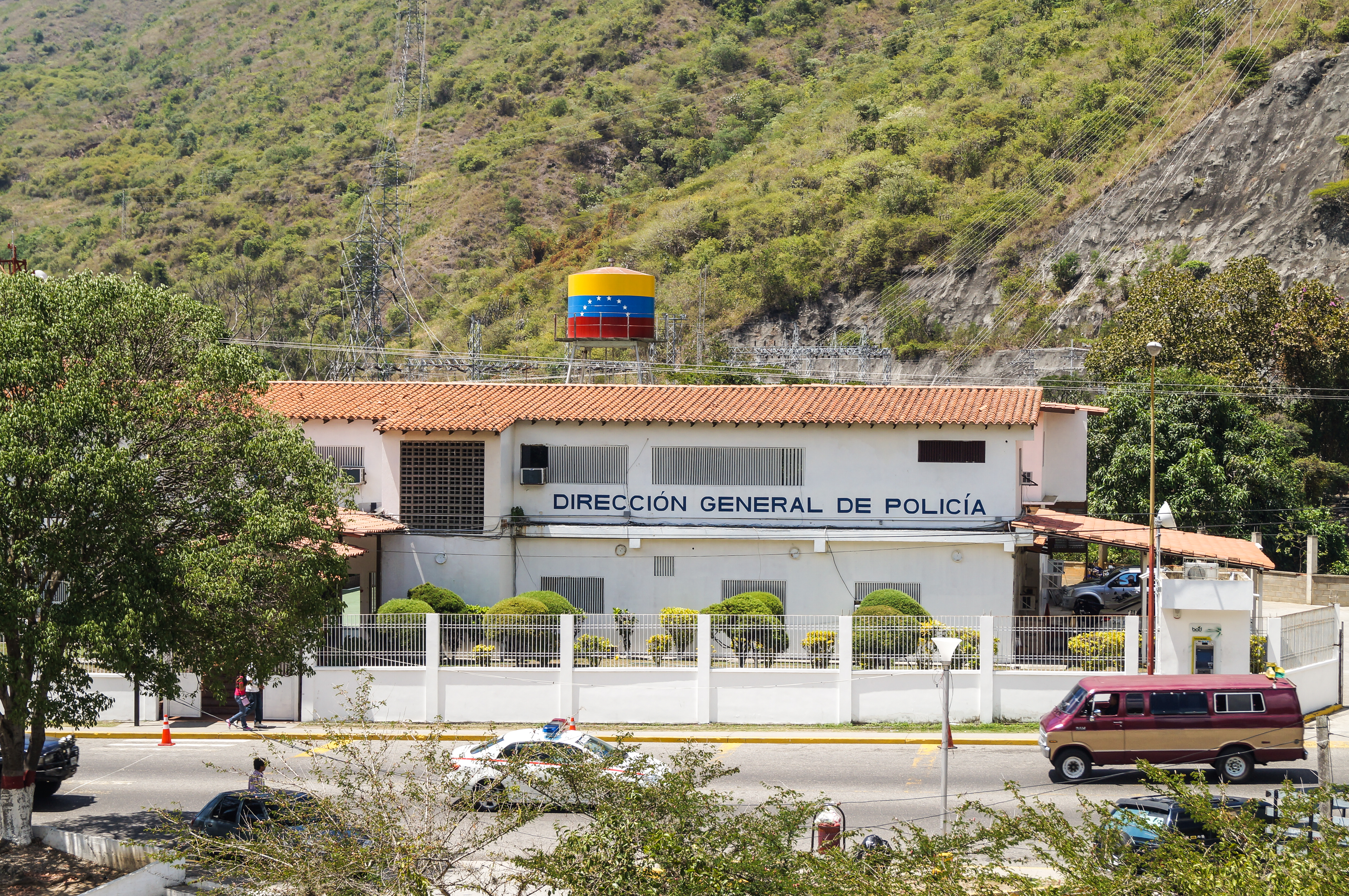
Headquarters of the General Directorate of the State Police of Trujillo

== Demographics ==
Historical population
Year	Pop.	±% p.a.
1873	108,672	—
1881	144,102	+3.59%
1891	146,585	+0.17%
1920	178,942	+0.69%
1926	218,780	+3.41%
1936	242,605	+1.04%
1941	264,270	+1.73%
1950	273,919	+0.40%
1961	326,634	+1.61%
1971	381,334	+1.56%
1981	433,735	+1.30%
1990	493,912	+1.45%
2001	608,563	+1.92%
2011	686,367	+1.21%
Source: "XIV CENSO NACIONAL DE POBLACIÓN Y VIVIENDA - Resultados por Entidad Federal y Municipio del Estado Trujillo" (PDF). Instituto Nacional de Estadística.

The main cities in the state of Trujillo are: Valera, a city that is the economic capital of the state, and at the same time, the city with the largest population (165,848 inhabitants in 2015 and about 200,000 with the conglomerate Valera-Carvajal). Another important city is Boconó, which is one of the cities with the largest population of the state (127,420 inhabitants), this is an agro-industrial city. Trujillo is the political-administrative capital of the state, with some growth in tourism and other economies. Other important towns are: La Puerta, Pampán, a town of historical importance, Pampanito, Cuicas, Santa Ana de Trujillo, Carache, a great producer of papelón, Betijoque, Escuque, Motatán and others, towns of great regional culture, among others. Its main and only port is La Ceiba located on the eastern coast of Lake Maracaibo.

=== Race and ethnicity ===
According to the 2011 Census, the racial composition of the population was:

Racial composition	Population	%
Mestizo	—N/a	49.6
White	369,961	48.3
Black	9,958	1.3
Other race	—N/a	0.8

== Economy ==
The state bases its economic activity mainly on agriculture, which is complemented by other important sectors.

- Breeding: Poultry, Aquaculture, Bovine, Sheep and Pigs.
- Fishing: Dogfish, Smooth, Skate, Bass and Crab.
- Agricultural Products: Coffee, Cambur, Sugar Cane, Corn, Potato, Banana, Beet, Yucca and Mushroom, of which 40,000 kg are currently produced in Boconó. It should also be noted that in the agricultural area there is a growing development that is supported by more than ten (10) Fish Production Units, which maintain considerable levels of production of Trout in the Municipality of Boconó (50. 000 kg/year); Tilapias in the El Jaguito sector of the Andrés Bello Municipality (100,000 kg/year) and the Artificial Reproduction Plant located in El Corazón Moor, "El Riecito" sector (Municipality of Trujllo), whose production of trout fry is close to 300,000 units/year.
- Forest Resources: Carob tree, Apamate, Gateado, Jabillo, Jobo, Roble, Vera, among others.
- Mineral Resources: Despite the discovery of oil in Lake Maracaibo at the beginning of the 20th century, oil activity in Tomoporo only began timidly in the 1980s, when the TOM-1 well was drilled in 1986. With the drilling of the TOM-7 well in 1999 by EXXON Mobil, which produced 16,000 barrels per day, a giant field was discovered, which is now 25 wells in 2009. Among other mineral resources being exploited in the state are Silica Sands, Limestone, Feldspar, Granite, and Mica.

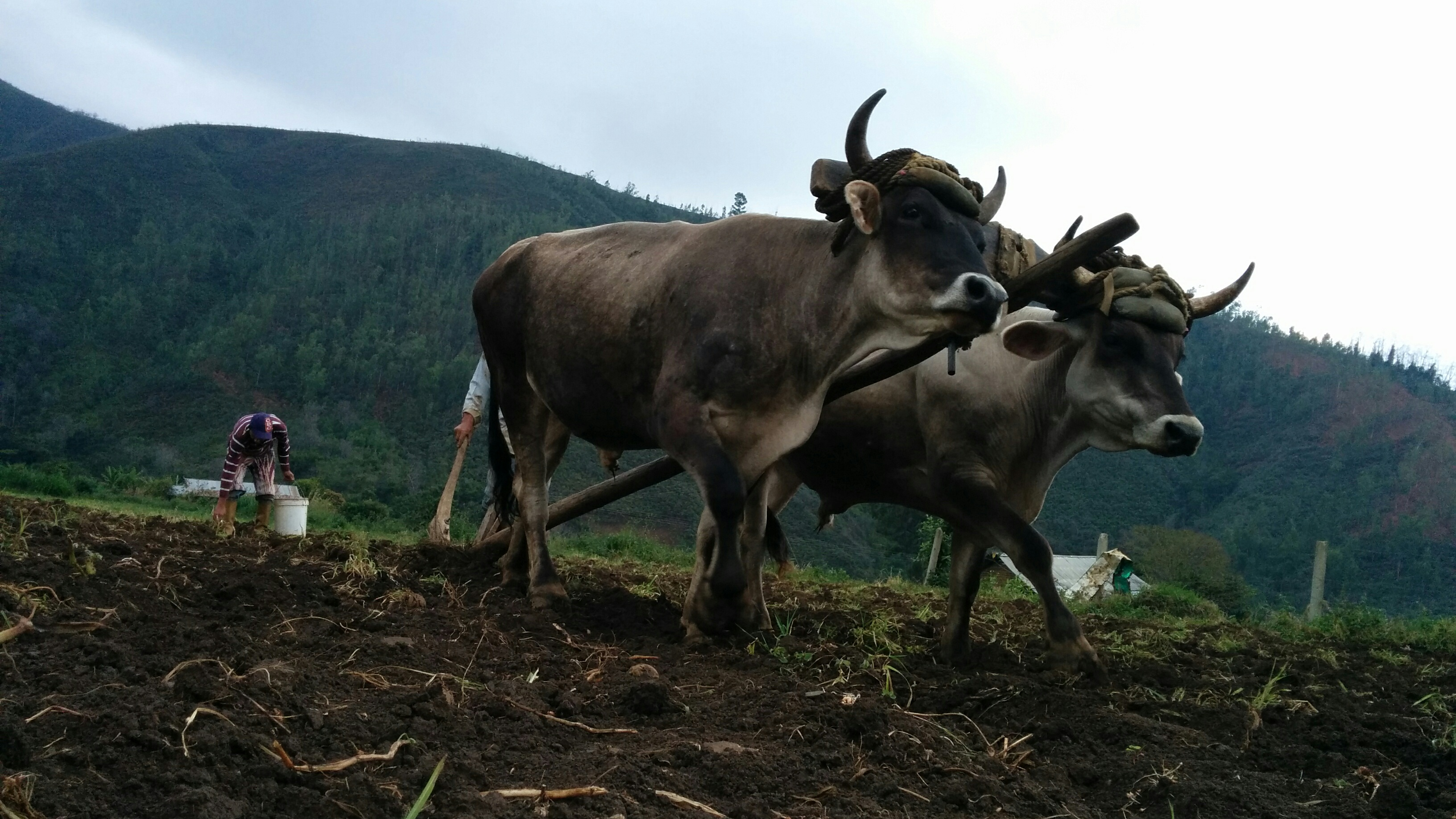
Potato harvest in the state of Trujillo

=== Agriculture ===
The great variety of geological, geomorphological and climatic factors have determined the existence of a great variety of soils in the state, which has a total of 291,280 ha of agricultural land, representing 39.36% of its total area. In addition some 55,110 ha of livestock use (7.45%), some 307,020 ha of forest vegetation (41.49%) and 86,590 ha of combined use (11.70%). In the plain in contact with Lake Maracaibo or "low zone", specifically in jurisdiction of the municipalities of Andrés Bello, La Ceiba, Sucre, Bolívar and Monte Carmelo, and in the plains of Monay (municipality of Pampán), the highest proportion It comprises about 200,000 ha of land suitable for agricultural and forestry use for the cultivation of cereals, oilseeds, roots and tubers, vegetables and plantations and/or fruit trees.

One of the oldest irrigation systems and agricultural settlements in the country, El Cenizo, was built in this area and development programmes have been undertaken It is also located on the plain in the industrial zone of Agua Santa, of the same name as the Caús-Pocó, with fruit trees, cereals and an important Cattle farm. In the plains of Monay, located in the north and east of the AguaViva, sugar cane production has a great competitive advantage due to its proximity to the La Pastora power station and the agronomic conditions of its soils.

== Tourism ==
Among the sites of tourist interest in the state are the buildings and monuments that served as the scene of events that had a strong meaning during the time of the independence struggle, the main ones are the Admirable campaign and the signing of the Decree of War to Death and the Treaty of Armistice and Regularization of the War. In addition to these we can also find various natural monuments.

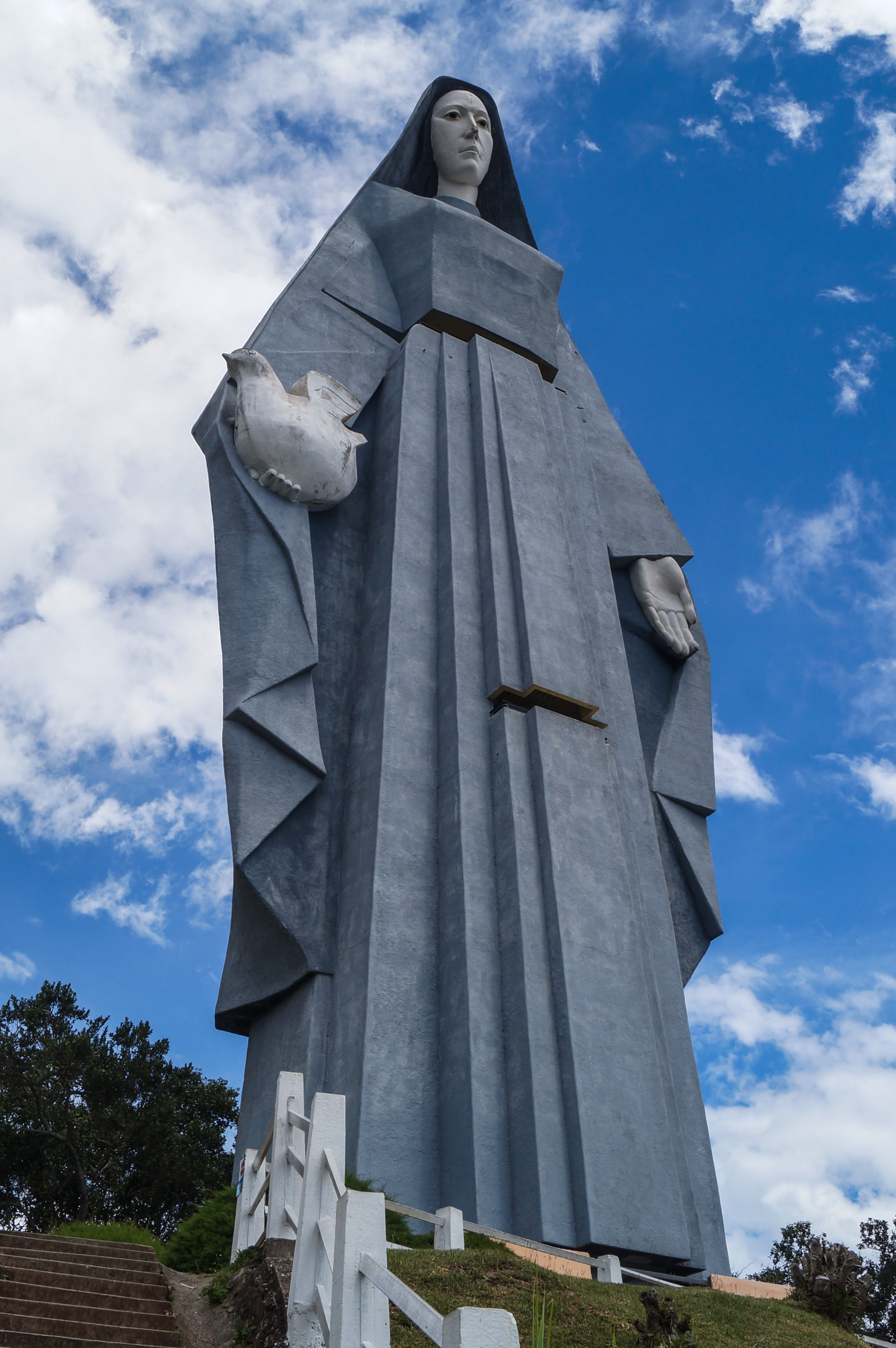
Monument to Our Lady of Peace, Trujillo State

- Natural Monuments
  - Natural Monument Teta de Niquitao-Guirigay.
  - Diego García de Paredes Park.
  - Esteban Valera Park.
  - Park Francisco Jose Matheus.
  - Park the Stone of the Zamuro.
  - National park Dinira.
  - General Cruz Carrillo National Park (Guaramacal).
  - Sierra de la Culata National Park.
  - Park and protective zone El Riecito (Páramo El Corazón). Convergence of the Municipalities Trujillo, Urdaneta and Boconó.
  - Park Caves of the Golondrino.
- Built monuments
  - Monument to the Armistice in Santa Ana
  - Ateneo of Trujillo
  - Athenaeum of Valera
  - Ateneo de Boconó
  - San Isidro Castle (Valera)
  - Regina Angelorum Convent (Trujillo)
  - Galleries the Eye of San Alejo Church
  - Sanctuary of Dulce Nombre de Jesús de Escuque
  - Chiquinquirá Church of Trujillo
  - San Juan Bautista Church in Valera
  - San Juan Bautista Church in Carache
  - San Juan Bautista Church of Betijoque
  - San Antonio Abad de Mendoza Church
  - San Jacinto de Polonia Church in Trujillo
  - San Rafael Arcángel Church in Cuicas
  - San Miguel de Boconó Church
  - Trujillo's Mother Church

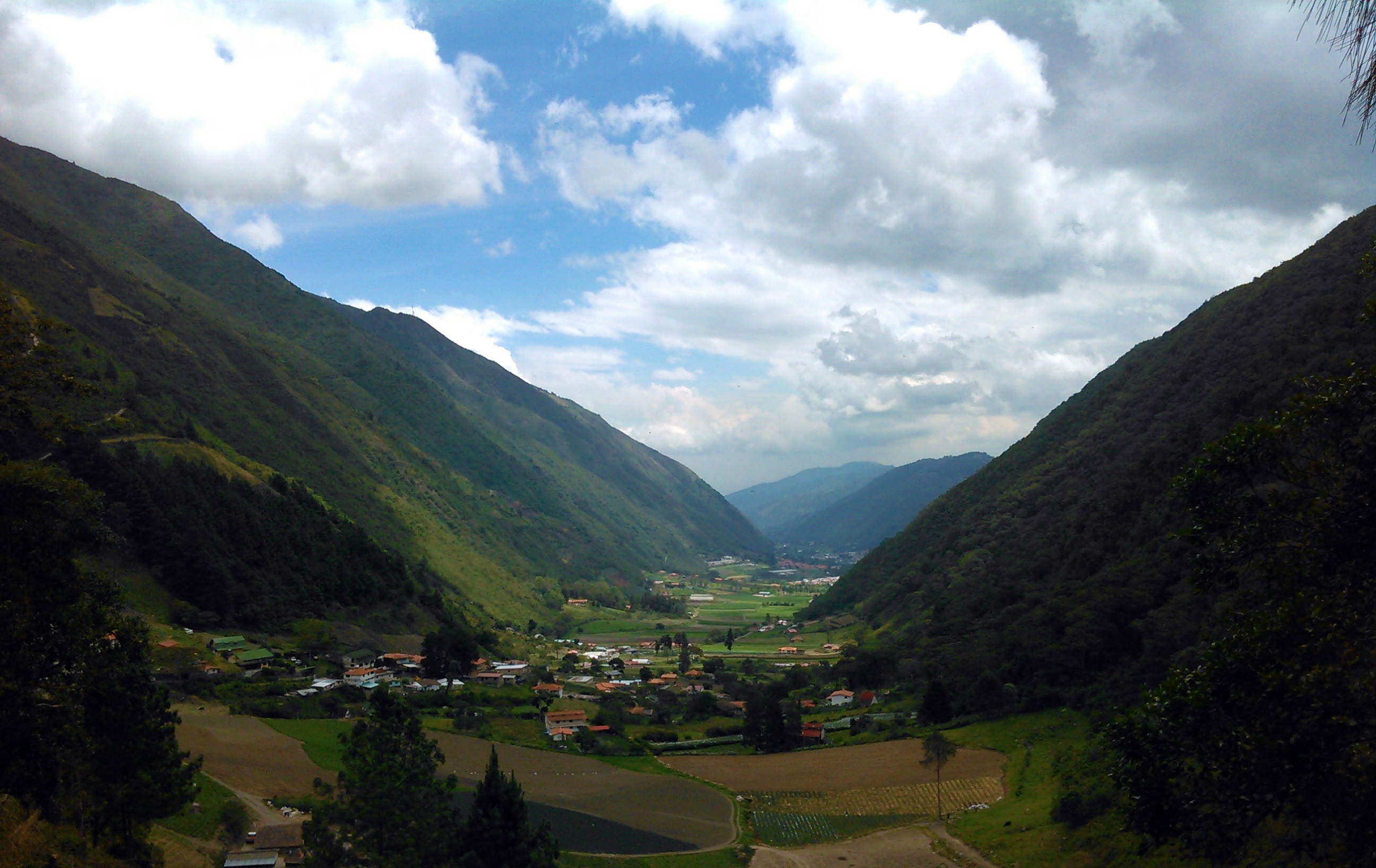
Momboy Valley, Trujillo State

  - Monument to the Virgin of Peace
  - Monument or Chapel of Dr. José Gregorio Hernández
  - Monument to Dr. Nexis Caraballo
  - Alfredo Paredes Museum
  - Rafael Rangel Museum
  - Salvador Valero Museum
  - Jacinto Gonzalez Pre-Columbian Museum
- Los Clavo Trapiche Museum
  - Tulene-Bertoni Museum
  - Rivas Dávila Army Headquarters (Trujillo)

=== National Parks ===
- The General Cruz Carrillo National Park (Guaramacal Park) is an interesting ecosystem located in the mountains of Guaramacal, formed by cloud forests and moors with little intervention. It was created according to Decree No. 2,170 of May 25, 1988, to protect it both for its environmental interest and to ensure the production of water for the supply of the surrounding population centers and for the Boconó-Tucupido hydroelectric development. It is located in the jurisdiction of the states of Trujillo and Portuguesa; it has an extension of 210 km2, of which 193.11 km2 are included in the state of Trujillo.

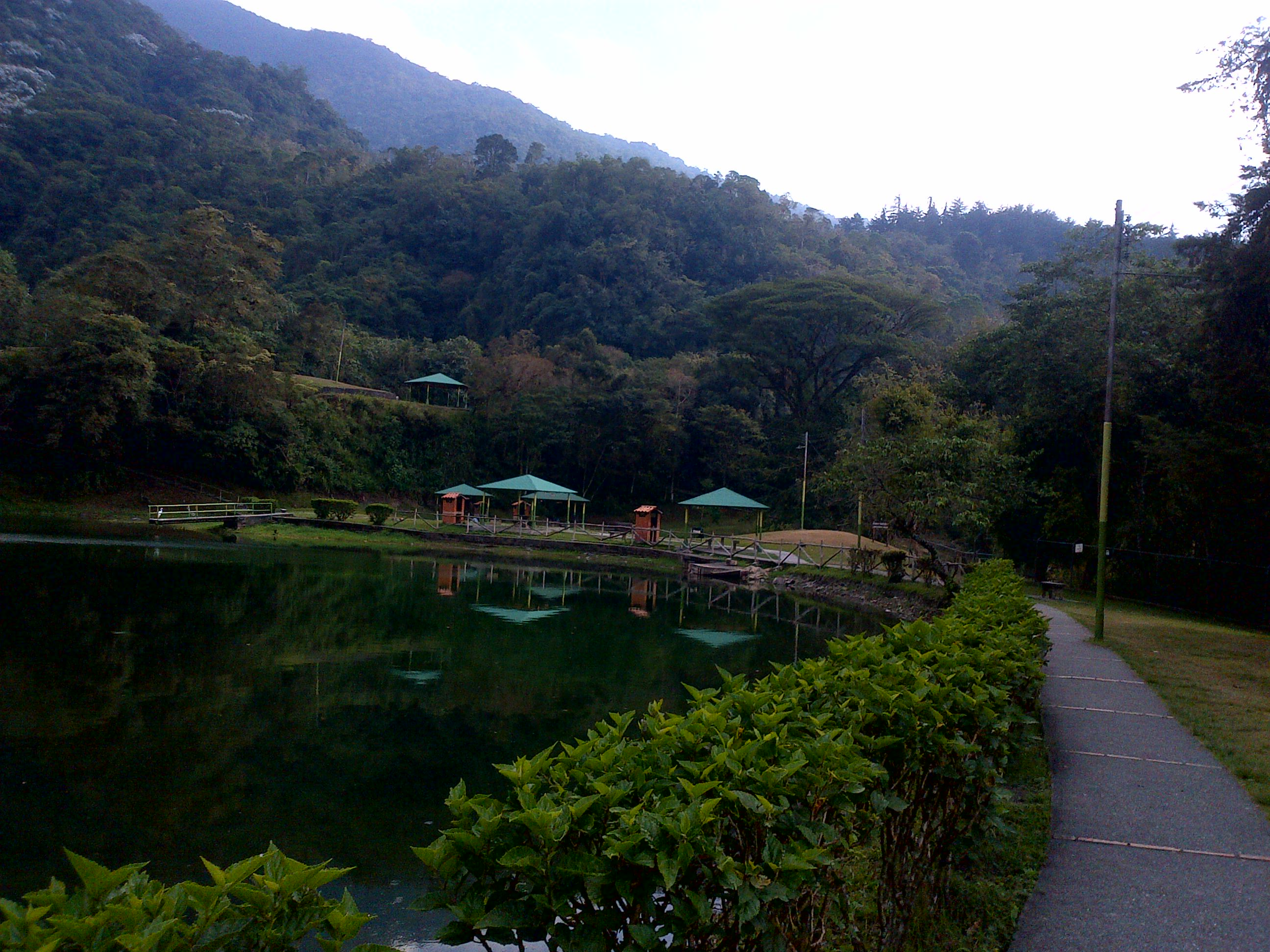
Guaramacal National Park, Trujillo

- Dinira National Park was created according to Decree No. 2564 dated November 30, 1988, to protect the upper basins of theTocuyo River, in the state of Lara; the Chabasquén and Boconó Rivers, in the state of Portuguesa; and the Carache River, in the state of Trujillo, and to guarantee the water resources necessary for human supply, agricultural development and biological diversity. It is located towards the northeast of the state, on the border with the states of Lara and Portuguesa, with whom It has an area of 453.28 km2, of which only 97.41 km2 correspond to the state of Trujillo.
- The Sierra de La Culata National Park (named after the Meridian conservationist Antonio José Uzcátegui) occupies an area of 2,004 km2, of which only 106 km2 are in the jurisdiction of the state of Trujillo, and the rest in the state of Merida. It was created according to Decree No. 640 dated December 7, 1989, to preserve the plant formations, ecological processes, biological species and physical features existing in the area, as well as for the integral protection of the upper river basins Chama, Mucujún, Capaz, Motatán, Tucaní and Santo Domingo, to ensure the supply of permanent and good quality water for human consumption, irrigation and hydroelectricity.

== Religion ==
The majority of the population of the state of Trujillo is Christian, mostly belonging to the Catholic Church, with minorities belonging to other Christian denominations and small groups of atheists.

The state has a rich Christian religious architecture among which it is possible to highlight:

- Monument to the Virgin of the Peace: On the hill called Peña de la Virgen, is one of the most important religious tourist attractions in the state of Trujillo: the monument to the Virgin of Peace, the tallest sculpture in the Americas, work of the artist Manuel de la Fuente, inaugurated on December 21, 1993, being the president at that time Dr. Luis Herrera Campins.It is 46.72 meters high and weighs 1,200 tons. It consists of five viewpoints from which you can see the lake of Maracaibo. It is the tallest living monument in the Americas, surpassing the Statue of Liberty in the U.S. and Christ the Redeemer in Brazil. It is also the tallest sculpture dedicated to the Virgin Mary in the world.
- San Alejo's Sanctuary: it is the Mother Church of Boconó's municipality, it is located in the whole center of the city in Bolivar's square. This temple was built in the same place where the old church of Boconó was located, which corresponded to the second half of the eighteenth century. The structures of the church are modern, it is also of great height. In the main tower there is a clock and a bell tower. The Clock of the San Alejo Church tower was donated by one of the wealthiest characters of the time, Don Perpetuo Clavo, who had it brought from Switzerland. Like several of the churches in the villages of Trujillo, the tower clock works perfectly and the bells announce the passing of time. On July 17, 2014, this church was elevated to Sanctuary in a solemn religious act, which was presided over by the Bishop of the Diocese of Trujillo, Monsignor Cástor Oswaldo Azuaje, it was declared a Sanctuary, after fulfilling the requirements demanded by the religious institution. This church is one of the largest and highest in the state of Trujillo. Because of its great structure and history this church is very visited by tourists and parishioners. Both the church of San Alejo and the church of Carmen are dedicated to the patron saints of Boconó, among which the glorious ideologist Bernardo Aceituno stands out. At present, an installation of multicolored LED lights is being developed on the facade and tower of the Sanctuary, and also the project for the elevation to the Basilica Menor

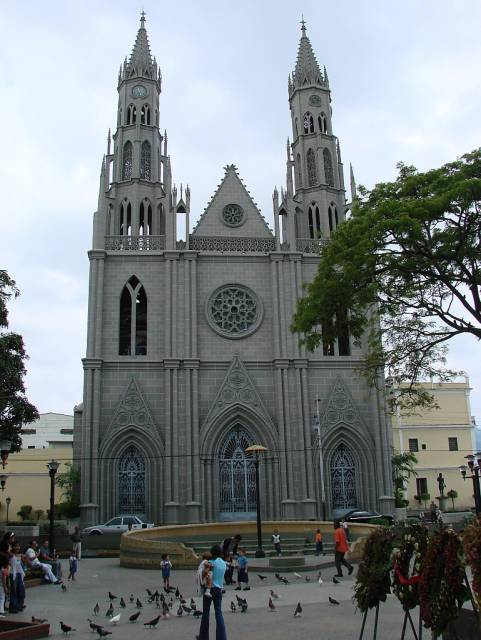
Church of St. John the Baptist in Valera, Trujillo

- Dulce Nombre de Jesús de Escuque Church: This Romanesque-Neo-classical style church began to build in 1909 and culminated in 1922, within the temple you can venerate the holy image of Dulce Nombre de Jesús de Escuque which is a Spanish image of carving a few inches high and dating from the fifteenth or sixteenth century this makes it one of the oldest images on America, The image arrived in Venezuela in 1610, you can also admire the baptismal font where the Servant of God José Gregorio Hernández was baptized, in the same way you can see the whole temple as the Chapel of the Holy Sacrament carved in marble and brought from Italy in the late 50's. This church was elevated to a sanctuary on January 30, 2015.
- Iglesia San Juan Bautista: It is a temple of Gothic style icon of the city of Valera, characterized by two twin towers smilares to the cathedral of Cologne that rise to 47 meters high, making it the highest church of all the Venezuelan Andes. Its construction began in 1927 and culminated 26 years later in 1953. In its lateral naves and in the apse you can admire 62 stained glass windows made in Munich, Germany, brought after World War II. It constitutes a tourist attraction of the city in front of the emblematic Plaza Bolívar in Valera.
- Cathedral of "Señor Santiago de Nuestra Señora de La Paz mother church concluded in 1.662 where the precious image of Nuestra Señora de La Paz from the XVII century coat of arms of the city of Trujillo and the state is venerated. On March 1, 1821, Bishop Lasso de La Vega welcomed the Liberator as Ruler and entrusted him to the divine providence.
- San Miguel de Boconó Church was built by the Franciscan order in 1660, following the Latin cross model of the temples of that time. Inside it has a baptismal font dating from 1617, the altar is from 1660 and the bells were made in 1770. Its sides are decorated with two stone carvings of anthropomorphic forms, corresponding to the pre-Columbian era. It was declared a National Historic Monument in 1960.
- Iglesia San Juan Buatista de Carache: Previously there was the old church, whose construction dates from 1554, was partially destroyed by the earthquake of 1854, in colonial times is noted for its simple facade, with tile roof and masonry decorations, where highlighted by its height the huge oval door. In its interior you can observe the spaces conforming 03 naves, with brick floors that later were these substitutes for colorful mosaics, they adorned the high pillars with stone bases, at the end were the chapels that adorned the church, a central one and several towards the sides very appreciated to the cathedral of Trujillo, where some images remained.

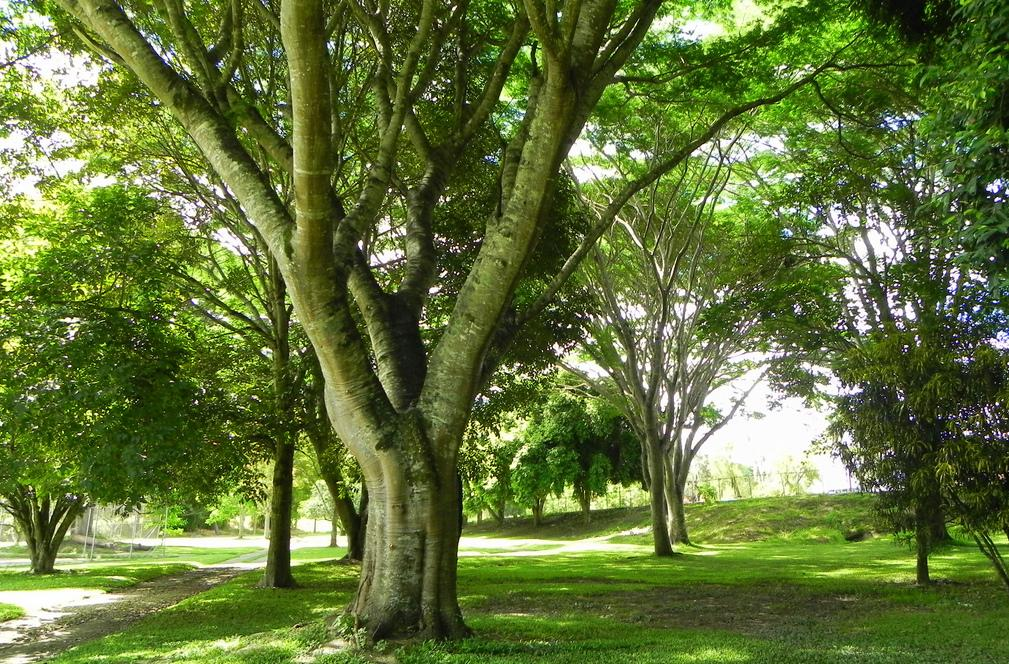
Dr. Eusebio Baptista Park, Boconó, Trujillo

== Municipalities and municipal seats ==
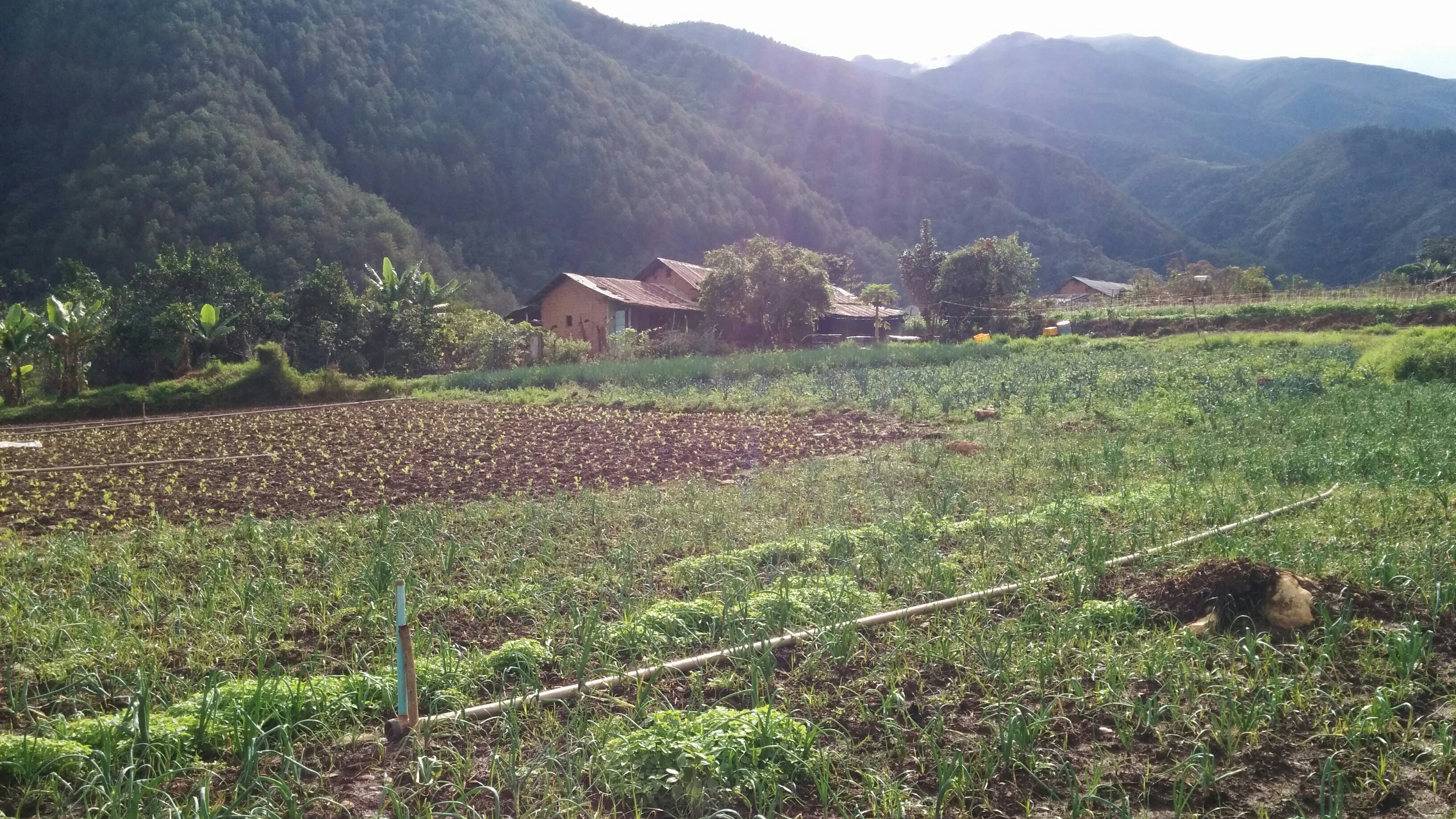
Carache Municipality, Trujillo

Municipalities of Trujillo

Municipality	Seat
Andrés Bello	Santa Isabel
Boconó	Boconó
Bolívar	Sabana Grande
Candelaria	Chejendé
Carache	Carache
Escuque	Escuque
José Felipe Márquez Cañizales	El Paradero
Juan Vicente Campo Elías	Campo Elías
La Ceiba	Santa Apolonia
Miranda	El Dividive
Monte Carmelo	Monte Carmelo
Motatán	Motatán
Pampán	Pampán
Pampanito	Pampanito
Rafael Rangel	Betijoque
San Rafael de Carvajal	Carvajal
Sucre	Sabana de Mendoza
Trujillo	Trujillo
Urdaneta	La Quebrada
Valera	Valera

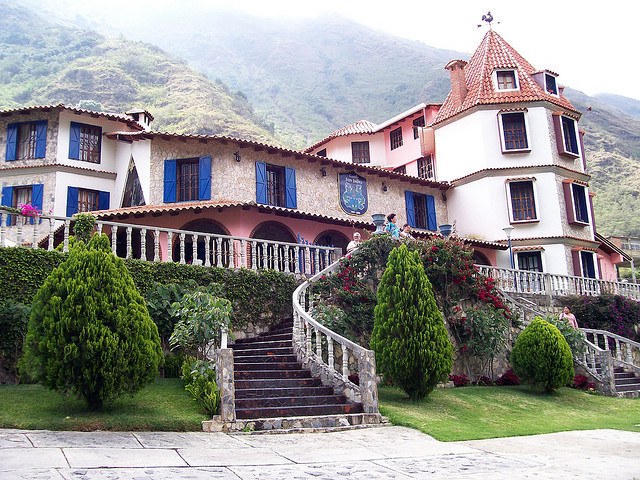
San Isidro Castle, Valera Municipality

== Education ==
- University of the Andes (Venezuela)

== Sports ==
The most popular sport in the region is football, something similar to what happens in other Andean states of Venezuela such as Táchira or Mérida. The most prominent team is Trujillanos Fútbol Club, which plays in the first division of Venezuela and is based in the Estadio Olímpico José Alberto Pérez de Valera, where the much smaller Somos Escuque Fútbol Club, a third division team, also plays its matches.

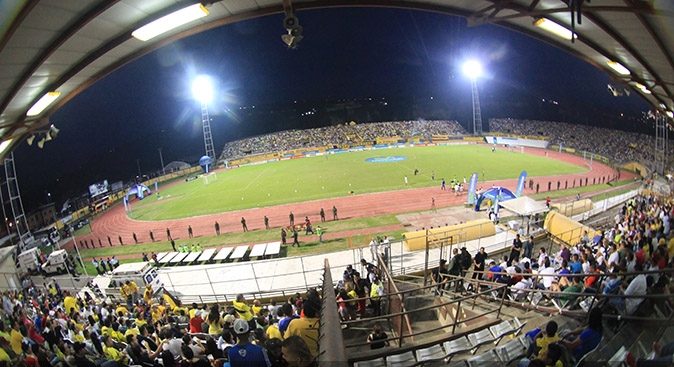
José Alberto Pérez Stadium in Valera, Trujillo State

The organization in charge of promoting sports in the state, is the Trujillo State Sports Institute called Indet, which manages other facilities such as the Ricardo Salas Gymnasium in San Luis (Gimnasio Cubierto "Ricardo Salas") in the Municipality of Valera, which is a sports hall suitable for sports such as basketball, volleyball or indoor football. Other facilities include the Baseball Stadium in San Luis, the Luis Loreto Lira Sports Centre, the "Carmania" Cultural Complex, the Vicente Laguna Velodrome in Mendoza Fría, the "Regulo Jiménez" Wrestling Gymnasium, the "Ana De Marchandi" Gymnasium, the "Nestor Rosales" Tae Kwon Do Gymnasium, the "Romulo Ramírez" Indoor Football Gymnasium, and the "Alicia Nava" Olympic Swimming Pool.

== See also ==
- States of Venezuela
- Teta de Niquitao-Guirigay Natural Monument
