= Municipal seat =

Term for an administrative center used in several Spanish-speaking countries

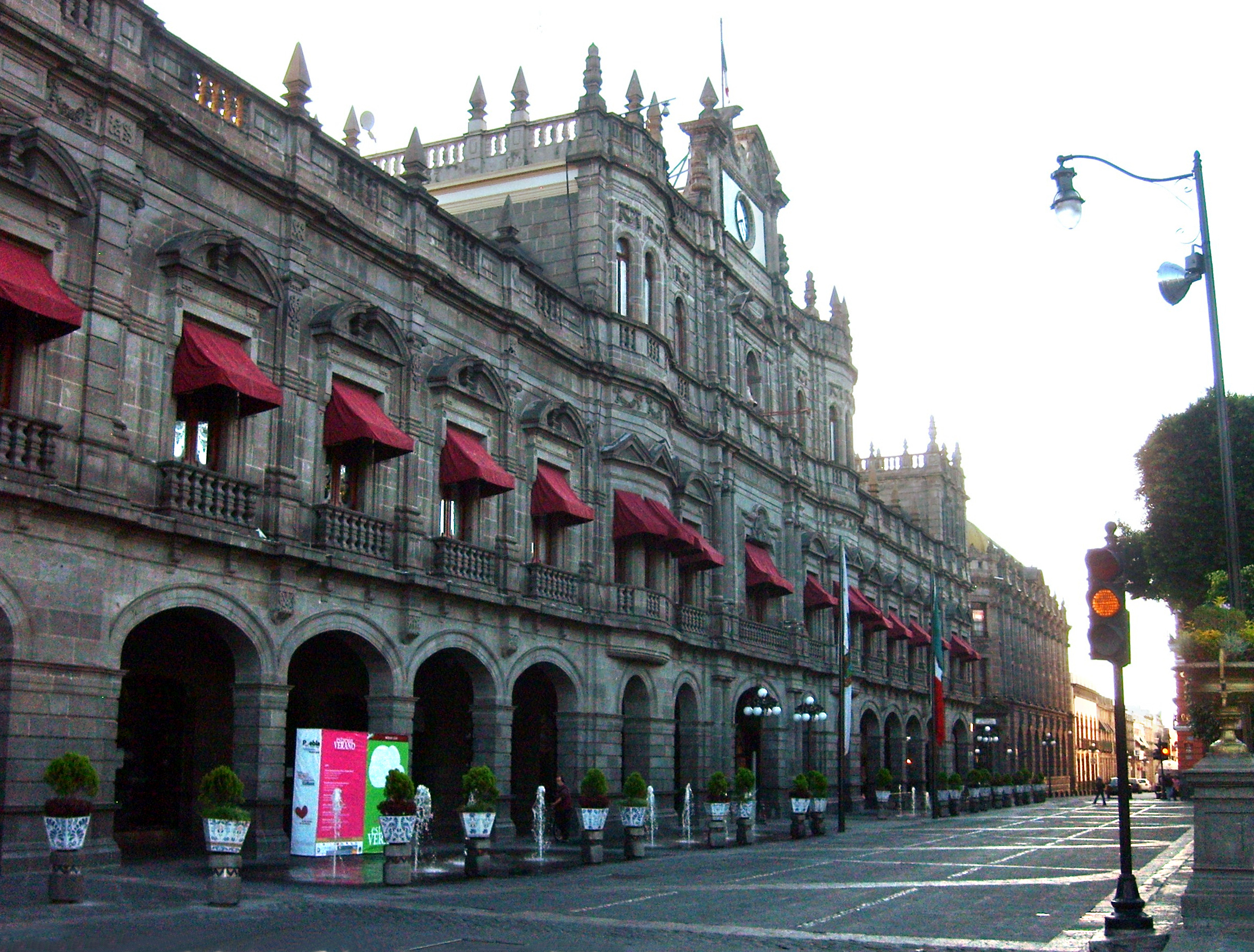
Municipal palace in the city of Puebla, Mexico.

A municipal seat (Spanish: cabecera municipal; ) is the administrative center and seat of government of a municipality or civil parish, with other villages or towns subordinated. The term is used in Brazil, Colombia, Mexico, Guatemala and Venezuela.

== Other variations ==
In Ecuador the term used is canton seat; in Argentina, department seat.

== See also ==
- County seat
