= Tourism in Venezuela =

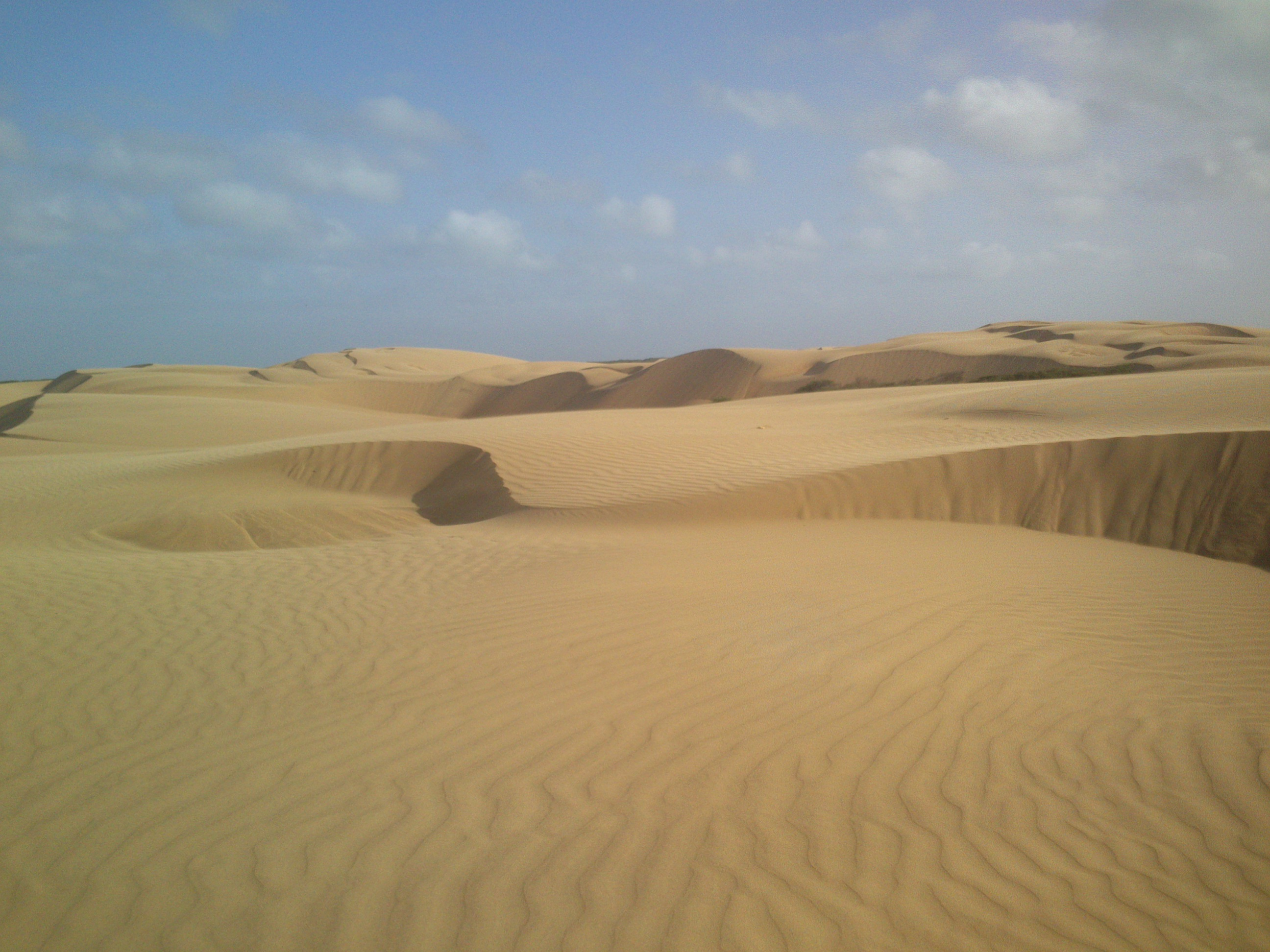
Médanos de Coro (Coro's dunes)

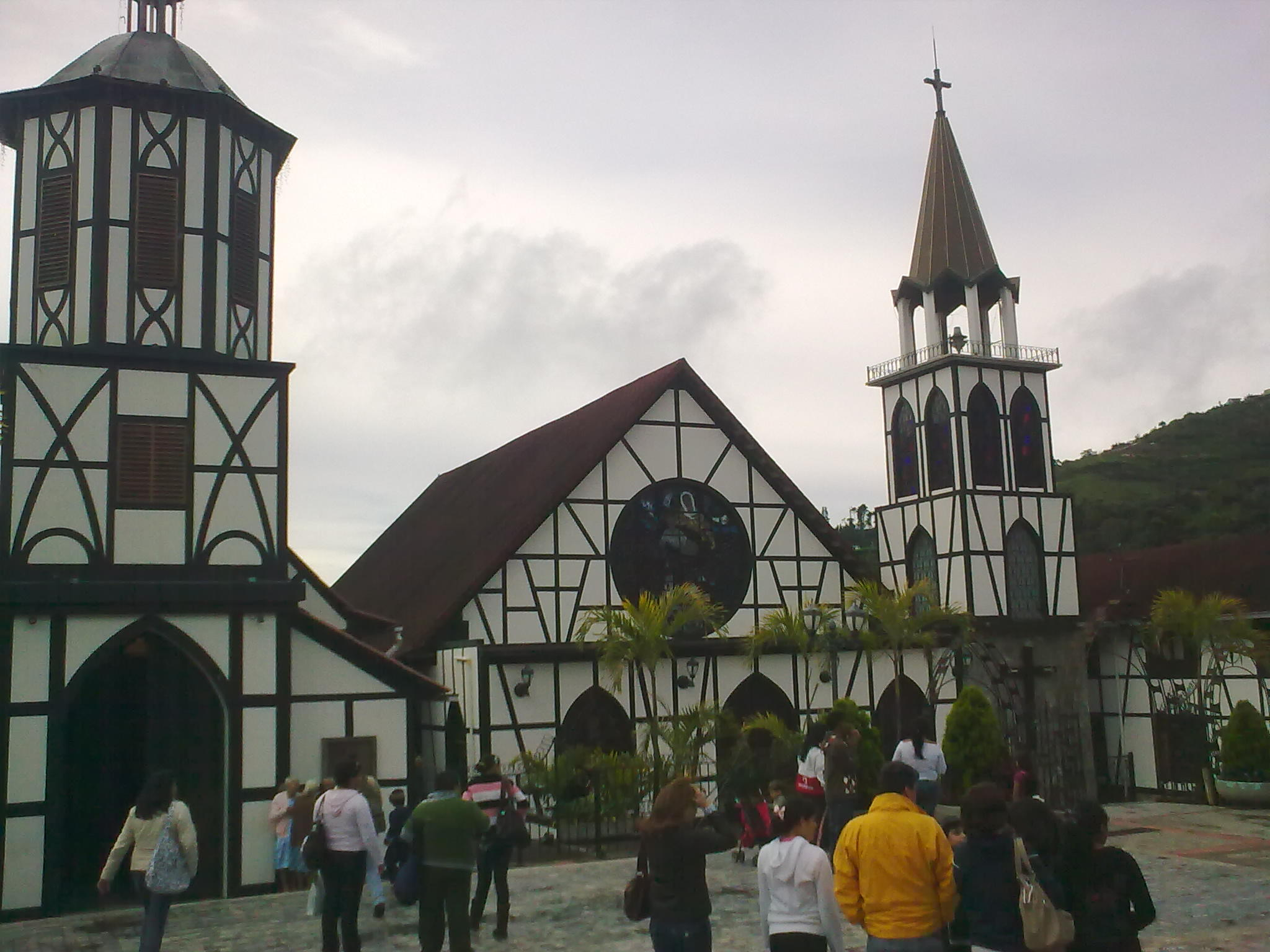
German origin settlement town Colonia Tovar

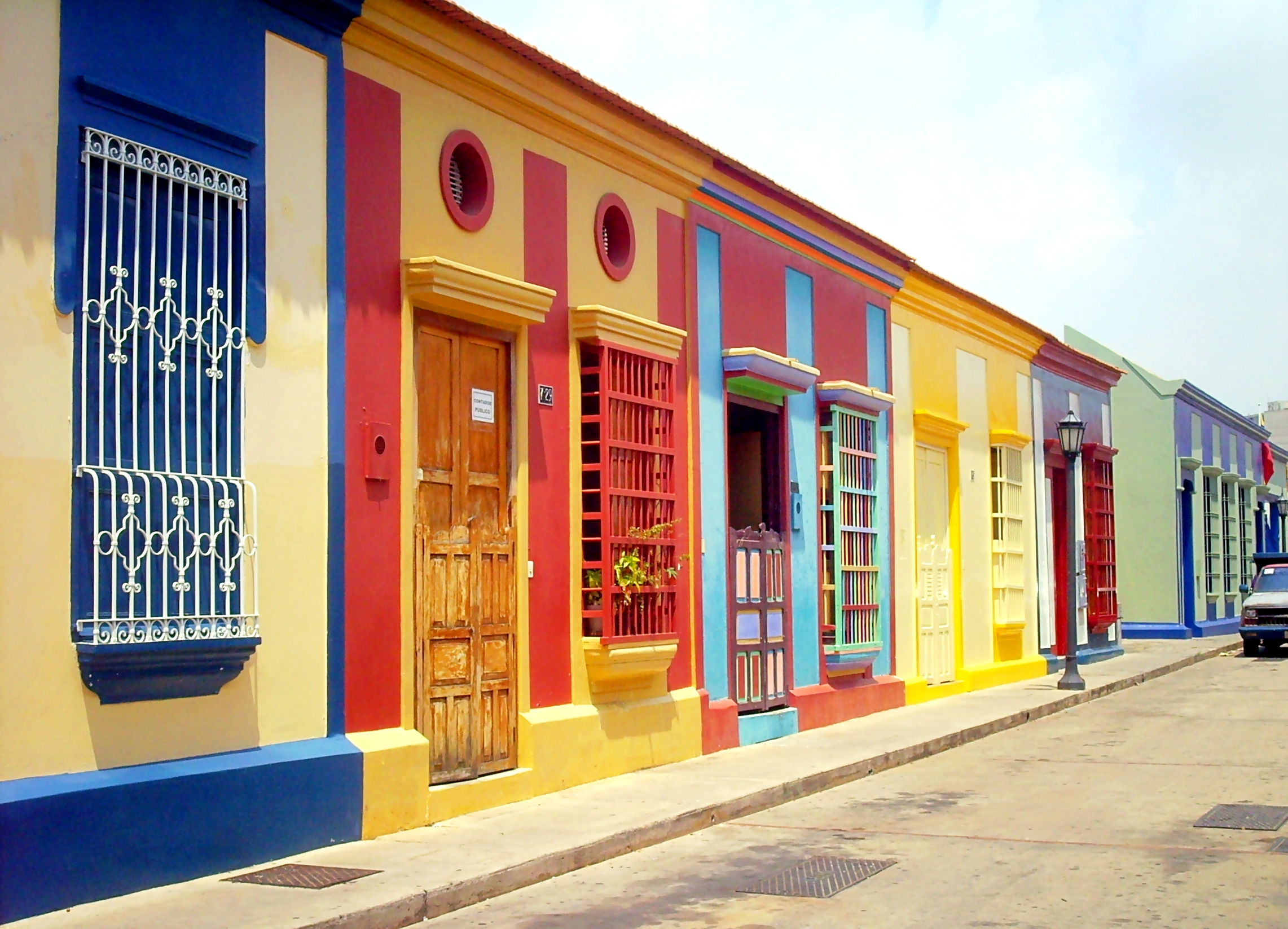
Colonial houses (city of Maracaibo)

Tourism in Venezuela has been developed considerably for decades, particularly because of its geographical position, the variety of landscapes, the richness of plants and wildlife, the artistic expressions and the privileged tropical climate of the country, which affords each region (especially the beaches) throughout the year. Since 2013, the country is having a very severe economic and political crisis affecting tourism all over the country.

== Major destinations ==
=== Mérida ===
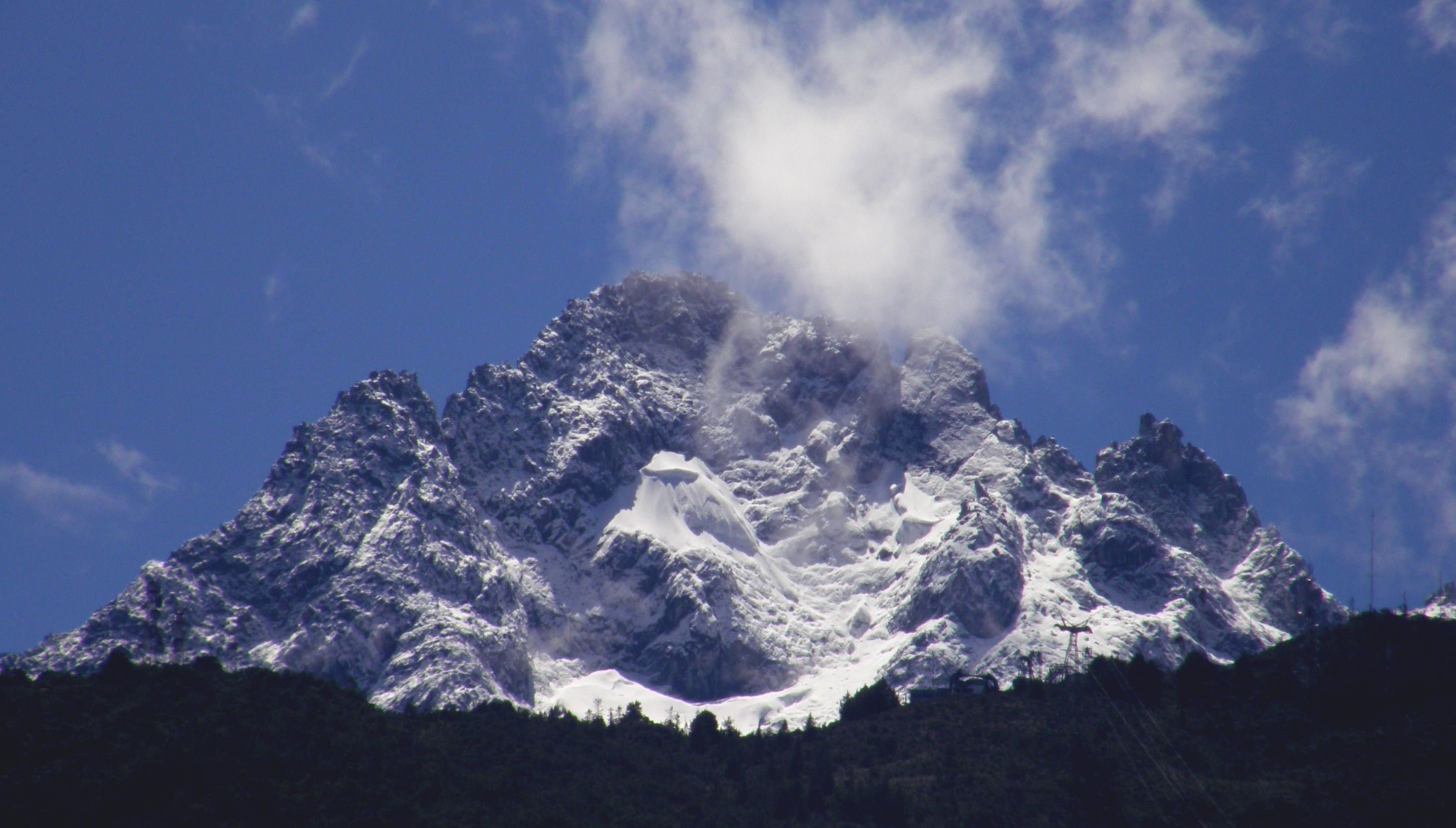
Bolívar Peak during snow season

Mérida state is a major tourist centre in Venezuela. It has an extensive network of hotels not only in the capital city but also throughout the state. Starting from the city of Mérida, it has the longest and highest cable car in the world, reaching the Espejo Peak of 4,765 m (15,633 ft). In the Méridan páramos, there are good hotels and restaurants. Another place to visit is Mucuchíes, the village of Los Aleros. There is also the National Observatory of Llano del Hato. The city has several museums worth visiting: Beekeeping Museum, Colonial Art Museum, Modern Art Museum, and the Museum of the great Méridan Don Mariano Picón Salas and the Aquarium Garden. Also in the state are hot springs such as Bailadores Las Tapias and la Capellanía Park.

=== Margarita Island ===
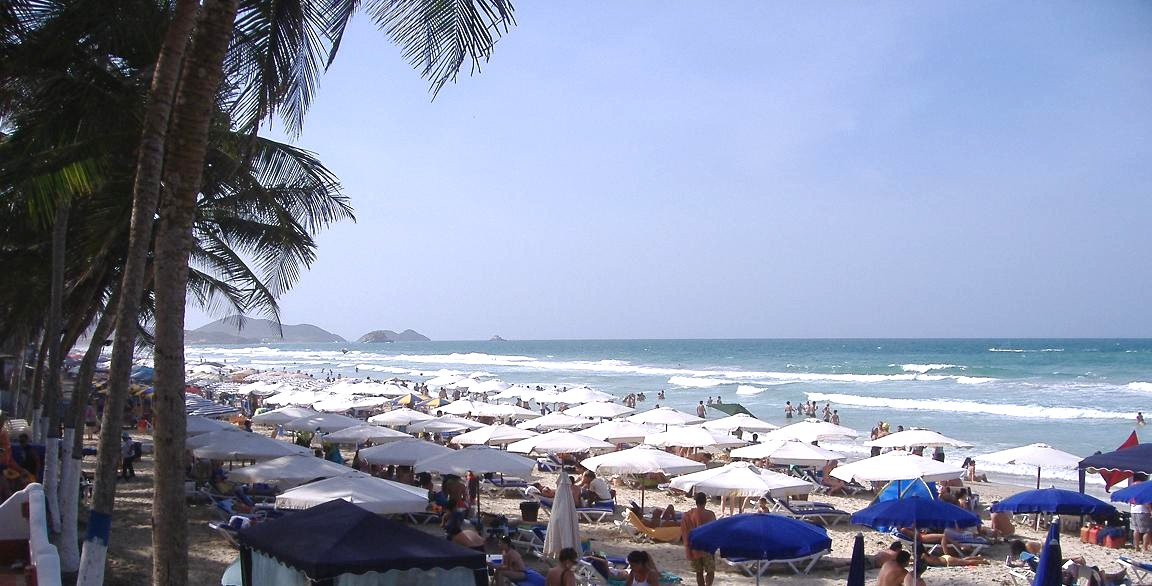
El Agua Beach (Margarita Island)

Margarita is an island with modern infrastructure, bordered by beaches suitable for extreme sports, and features castles, fortresses and churches of great cultural value. This island is found in the Caribbean Sea and is well known for its pearls.

=== Caracas ===
Caracas is the capital of Venezuela and a world-class cosmopolitan city. In the west of the city, the Libertador municipality, tourism is important in regard to the historic centre of the city, the Caracas Cable Car (Ávila mountain Cable Car), the University City of Caracas, Zoos, Sabana Grande Boulevard, among others.

In the east of the city, especially in the Chacao and Baruta municipalities environment of progress and modernism is indisputable, European-style shopping malls, beautiful squares, night clubs, etc. Also the Generalísimo Francisco de Miranda Park, located in the Sucre municipality is heavily of exploitation for tourism.

In the southeast end of city is located a small town, El Hatillo, which has an impeccable colonial town, an atmosphere of peace and tranquility.

To further exploitation of tourism as a factor of endogenous development, the national government has created socio-cultural plans of international concern as the Feria Internacional de Turismo de Caracas (FITCAR), which has been carried held annually since 2005 and promotes tourism in the country, showing to the world the cultural, tourist, traditional, musical and culinary wonders of Venezuela.

Venezuela has some of the most dangerous cities in the world, for example in 2018, there were 2,980 murders in Caracas (99.98 per 100,000 inhabitants), 645 murders in Ciudad Guayana (78.30 per 100,000 inhabitants), and 264 murders in Ciudad Bolívar (69.09 per 100,000 inhabitants). In Venezuela, under two per cent of reported crimes are prosecuted.

=== Los Roques and Morrocoy ===
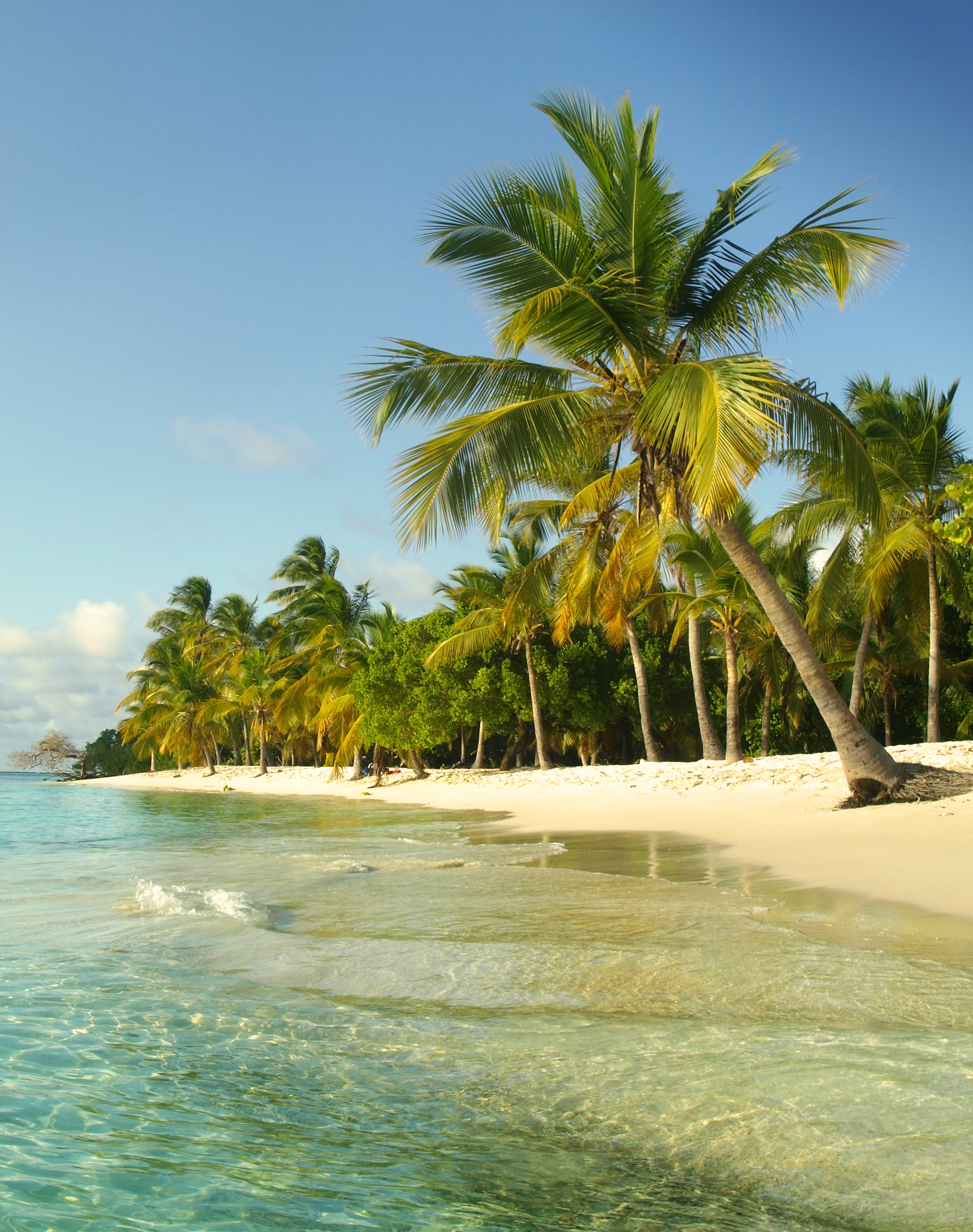
Morrocoy National Park

The archipelago of Los Roques is formed by a group of islands and cays that make up one of the main tourist attractions of the country. With exotic pristine beaches. Morrocoy is a park, consisting of very small nearby islands to the mainland, which have grown rapidly as one of the biggest tourist attractions in the Caribbean.

=== Canaima ===
Canaima National Park is spread over 30,000 square kilometres (12,000 sq mi) to the border with neighbouring Guyana and Brazil, for its size is considered the world's sixth largest national park. About 65% of the park is occupied by rock plateaus called tepuis. These are a unique biological environment, also presenting a great geological interest. Its steep cliffs and waterfalls (including Angel Falls, which is the highest waterfall of the world, 1,002 m (3,287 ft)) are spectacular sceneries.

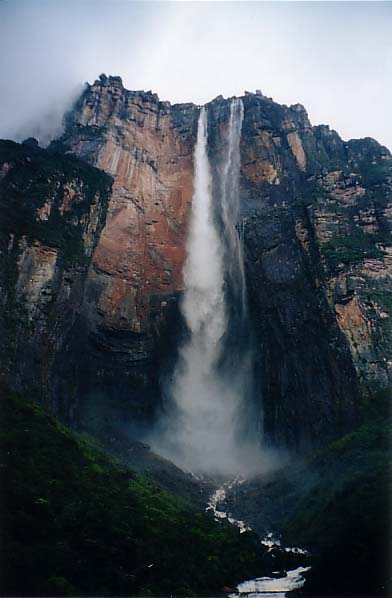
Ángel Falls

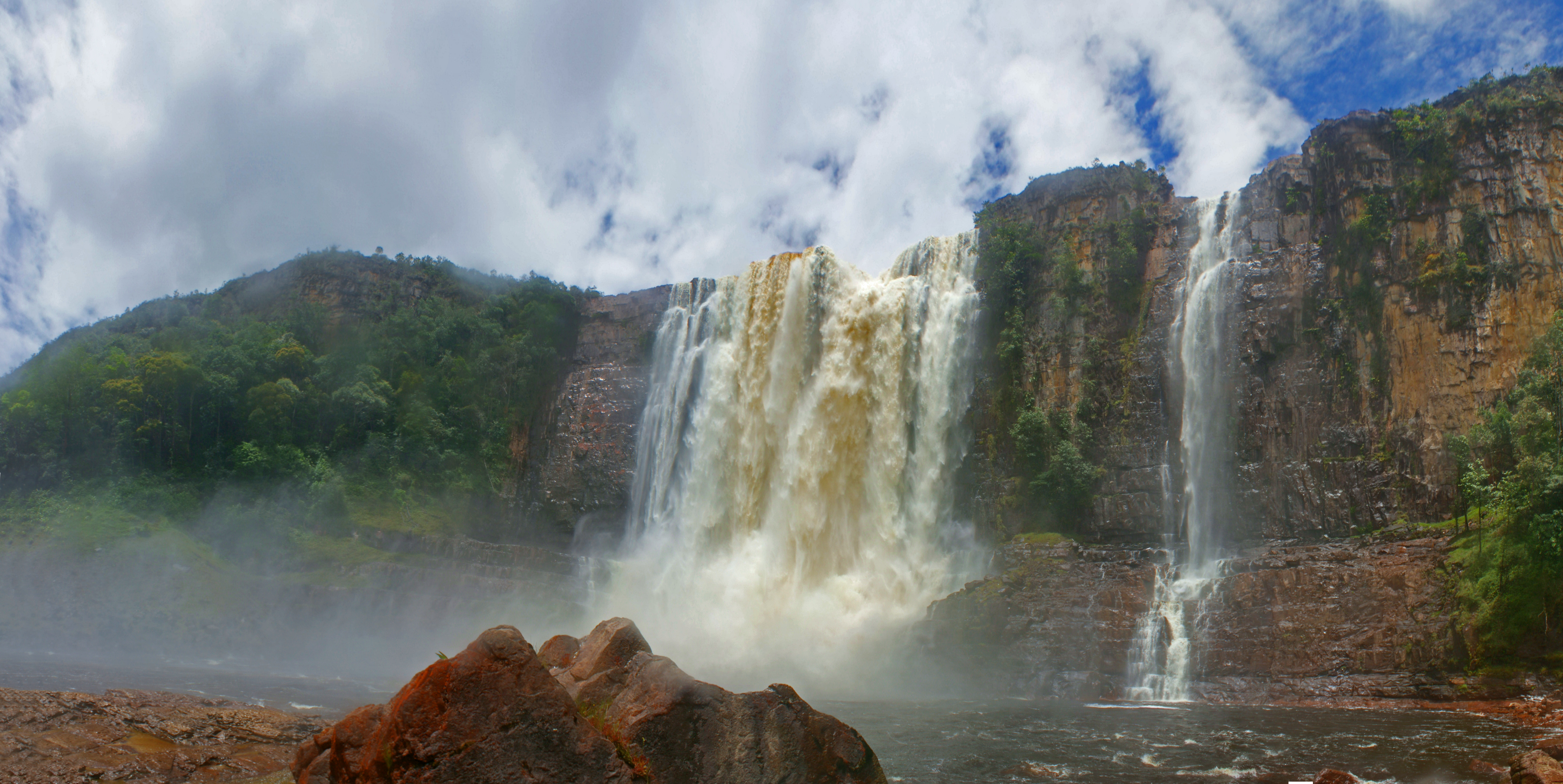
Chinak-Meru (Canaima National Park)

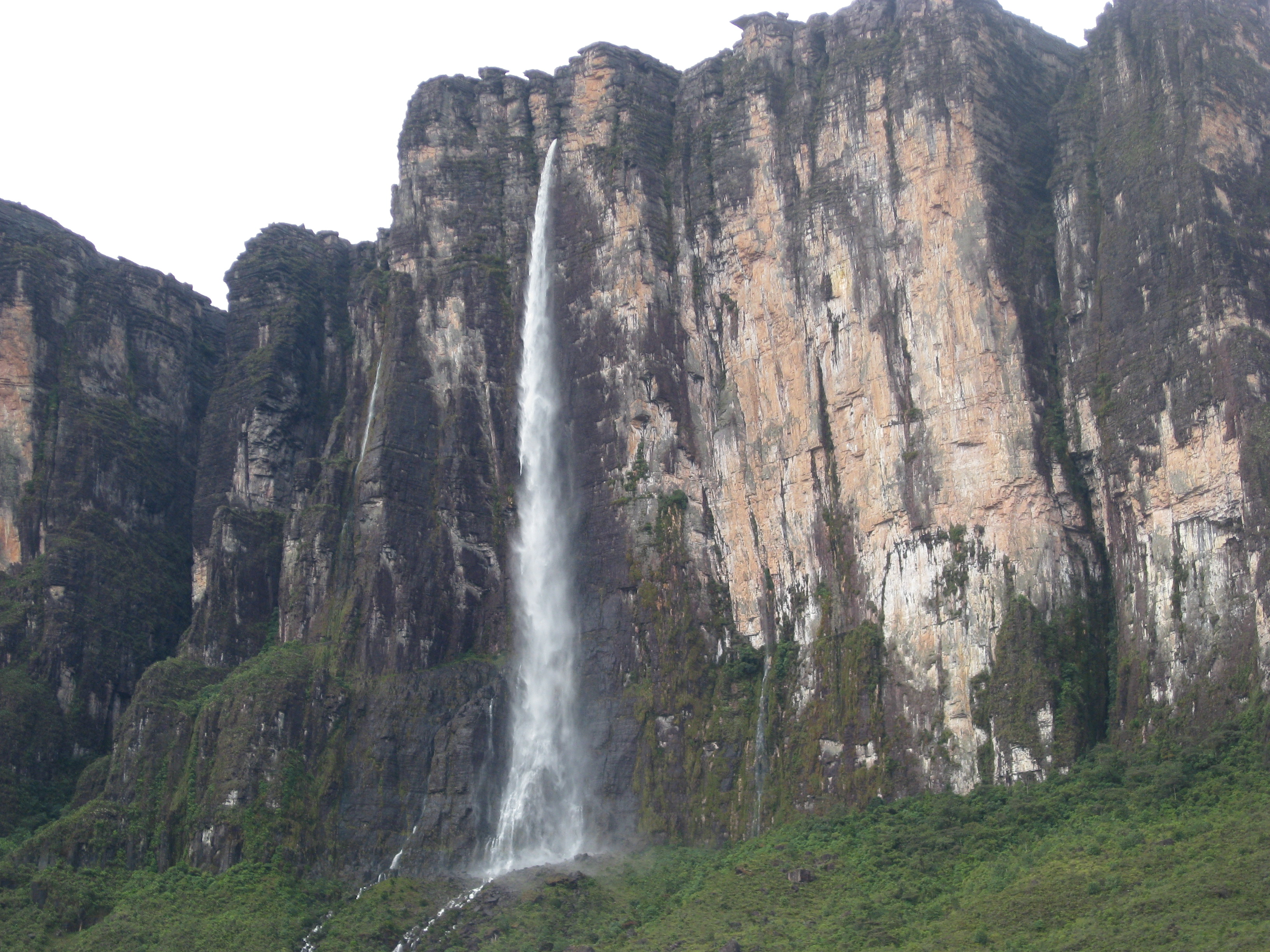
Cuquenan Falls, the second-tallest major waterfall in Venezuela after Angel Falls.

== World Heritage ==
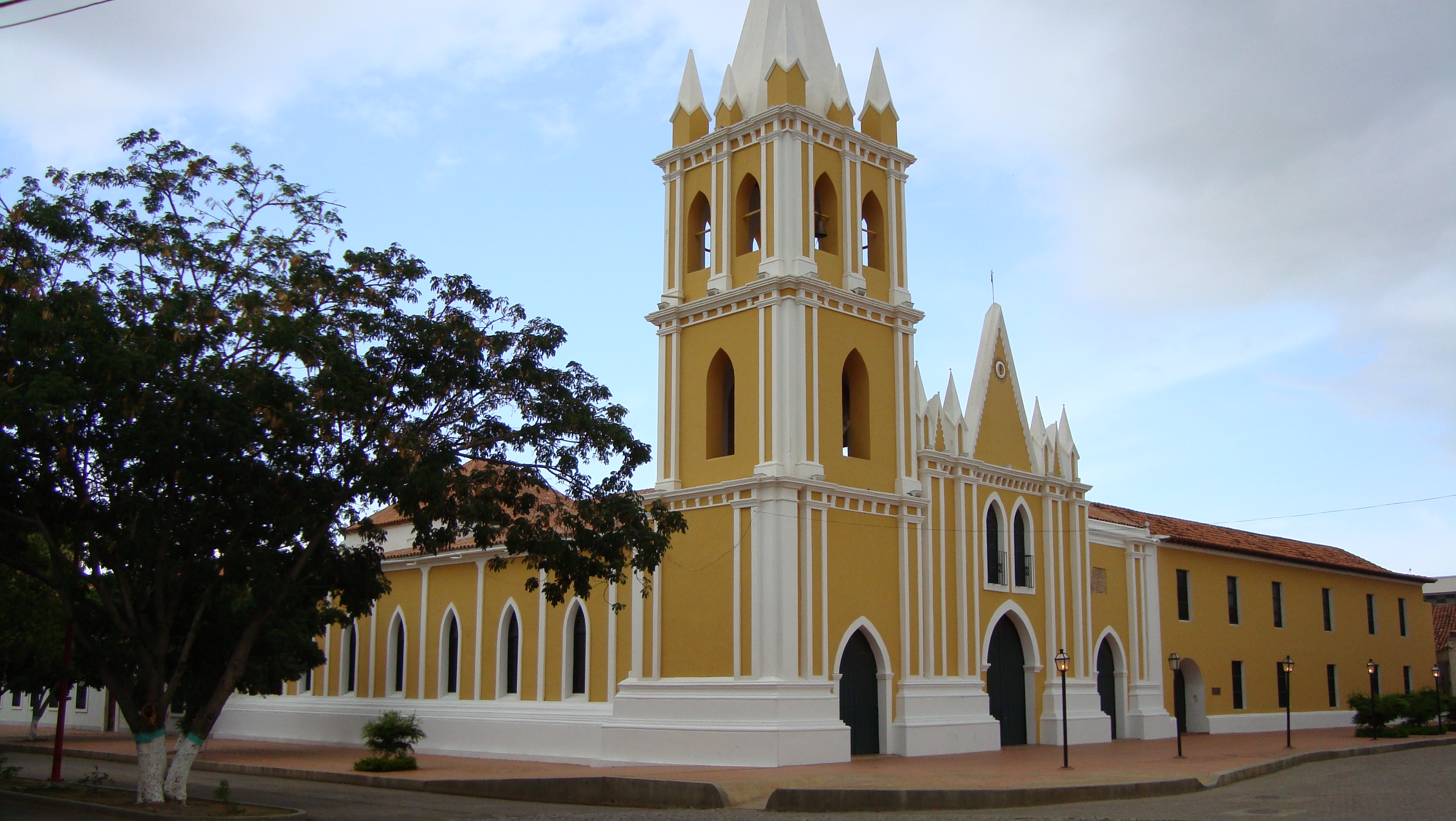
Example of a church in Coro Colonial city

- Coro: Coro is the oldest city in Venezuela, since it was the first Venezuelan city to be founded in 1527, the city was declared a World Heritage Site of the December 9 of 1993 by UNESCO in the meeting held in the Colombian city of Cartagena. Coro has an interesting history, including was the first federal capital of Venezuela. In 2005 was decreed patrimonial emergency and has been included in the list of World Heritage in Danger, this because of government neglect and intensity of rainfall occurred in recent years. At present the national government undertakes investments to preserve its rich architecture.
- Canaima National Park: It is a national park located in the Bolivar State, Venezuela. It was established the June 12 of 1962 and declared a World Heritage Site by UNESCO in the year 1994.
- University City of Caracas: The main campus of the Central University of Venezuela. It was declared a World Heritage Site by UNESCO in the year 2000. It is a real university, designed by the master Carlos Raúl Villanueva, the University City is primarily a work of art with contemporary architecture and a series of sculptures, murals, paintings and other arts spread throughout the campus university.

== Statistics ==
In 2010, about 526,000 tourists visited Venezuela that year, with tourist activity increasing. In 2023, 1.25 million tourists visited the country. By 2024, more than 1 million tourists were visiting the country annually. The most common visitors were Russian, Polish, Colombian, Iranian, Cuban and Portuguese nationals.

In 2025, 2.8 million international tourists visited the country between January and October. This marked an increase from previous years.

Rank	Country	2017
1	Colombia	69,124
2	Brazil	49,011
3	Spain	26,633
4	China	25,477
5	Argentina	24,243
6	Cuba	20,963
7	United States	19,051
8	Ecuador	17,785
9	Peru	15,800
10	Italy	15,587
11	Other Latin America	52,559
12	Other Europe	49,743
13	Other	41,024
Total		427,000

== Other tourist destinations ==
=== Beaches ===
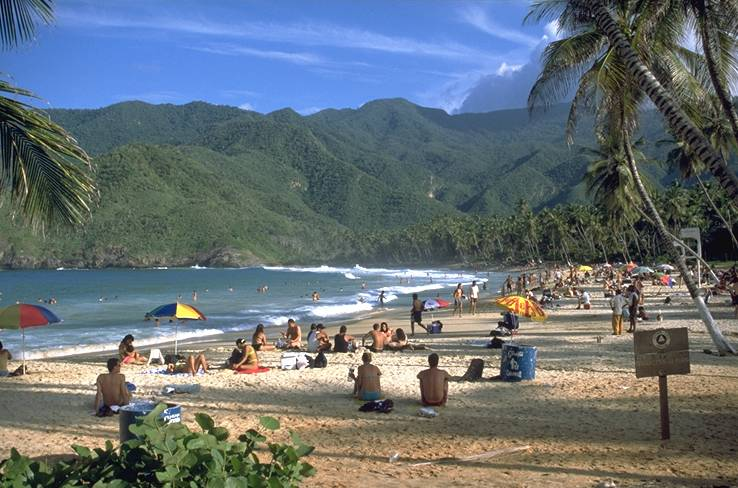
Choroní Beach, Choroní

Venezuela has many beaches of calm waters and for extreme sports. Besides those already mentioned, the sites most famous for its beauty are:

- Mochima
- Choroní and Chuao
- Los Roques Archipelago
- Coche Island
- Tucacas and Chichiriviche
- La Tortuga Island
- Paraguaná Peninsula
- Catia La Mar
- Cuyagua
- Puerto Cabello
- Bahía de Cata
- San Luis
- Venezuelan Beach Tourism

=== Jungle and Savannah ===
South of Venezuela in the states Bolivar, Amazonas and Delta Amacuro begins the Amazon rainforest. There is the Angel Falls, the highest waterfall of the world; savannah, rivers, forests and tepuis form a ecotourism that has not yet been utilized.

However, the influx of international tourists in Canaima and the Gran Sabana is high and has been gradually growing, some attractions in forest and savanna in Venezuela are:

- Canaima
- La Gran Sabana
- Angel Falls
- Mount Roraima
- Orinoco River
- Auyán-tepui
- Caroní River
- El Abismo
- Sapo Falls
- Tobogán de Agua (Water Slide)

=== Mountain ===
Although Venezuela is dominated by plains and tropical temperatures, with the Andes which begin in Venezuela, it has also a mountain range of great tourist attraction. Mérida state consists mainly of páramo vegetation, low temperatures, snow filled peaks, glaciers and high mountains of the Venezuelan Andes. Some of the Venezuelan mountain attractions are:

- Sierra Nevada de Mérida
- Peak Bolívar
- Mérida Cable Car
- Peak Espejo
- Peak Humboldt
- Sierra La Culata
- Batallón and La Negra Páramos
- Cerro El Ávila
- El Ávila Cable Car
- Chorro San Miguel (waterfall)
- Mucubají Lagoon
- Del Vino Waterfall in Dinira National Park
- Among other Andean highlands, located in the states of Mérida, Trujillo and Táchira:
  - Monumento a la Virgen de la Paz
  - Plateau La Galera Natural Monument

=== Los Llanos ===
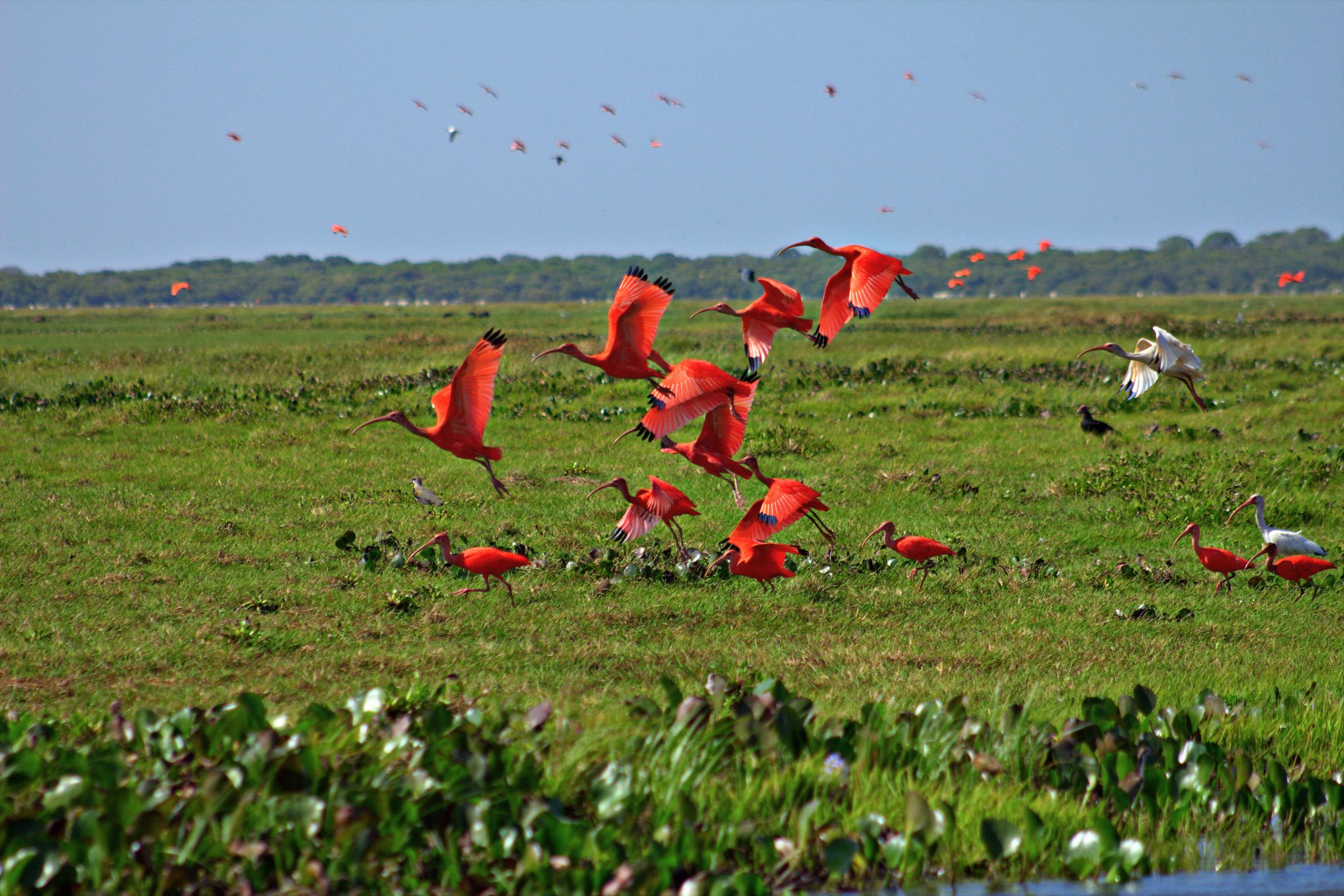
Scarlet Ibis in Los Llanos Region

Los Llanos is a region of Venezuela consisting of plains with few elevations, dominated by plateaus, hills, lakes and pastures. The climate is warm. This region has an average tourist reception, but it is an important site for the rural vacation, covering most of the states Apure, Barinas, Cojedes, Portuguesa, Guárico, Anzoátegui, Monagas and Delta Amacuro. In these rural plains are flora, fauna, livestock culture and typical features of the autochthonous culture of Venezuela combined. The higher mountain elevations of this Venezuelan region are in San Juan de los Morros.

=== Others ===
- Médanos de Coro (Coro's dunes)
- Cave of the Oilbirds
- Planeta Zoo
- Hundición Yay

=== Cities ===
- Coro
- Mérida
- Maracaibo
- Caracas
- Barquisimeto
- Puerto La Cruz
- Valencia
- Pampatar - Porlamar
- Puerto Cabello
- Calabozo
- Juan Griego
- Cumaná
- Ciudad Bolívar
- Tovar
- Ciudad Guayana
- Tinaquillo
- Acarigua
- San Cristóbal
- Barinas
- Guanare

=== Towns ===
- Colonia Tovar
- Galipán
- Punto Fijo
- Jají
- Bailadores
- Barlovento
- Apartaderos
- Mucuchíes
- Caripe
- San Antonio del Golfo
- Turén
- Naiguatá

== Culture ==
Venezuela has:

- 43 national parks
- 22 natural monuments
- 3 sites considered World Heritage Sites

=== Venezuelan cuisine ===
The Venezuelan cuisine varies by region of the country, however, the most typical dishes of national cuisine are: pabellón criollo, asado negro, reina pepeada, sancocho, mondongo, especially arepas or cachapas.

=== Music of Venezuela ===
The music genres in the various regions are: Joropo or Llanera music (from Los Llanos region of livestock culture, its lyrics are messages that express the values of the llaneran people, of European and Indigenous origin music genre, its subgenres are: Pasaje, Joropo central or Joropo tuyero, Joropo oriental, Joropo guayanés, Golpe tocuyano, Quirpa, Joropo llanero), Tambor (Afro-descendent music of mostly of Venezuelan coasts), Gaita Zuliana (the national Christmas music genre, from Zulia state, the topics covered in this genre range from love songs and religious figures to humorous and reporting issues. The political element is also starring in many subjects), Changa tuki (from Caracas; is an urban way of life, a form of electronic music that comprises dance, own urban clothing and music; the most representative is its dance, it is difficult and showy, recommended to watch, dance competences are made in different "matinees", its dancers are known as "tuki"; use hair's wicks yellow painted, red tight pants), Calypso made by Caribbean origin people in Southern Venezuela. Also there is urban music such as salsa, reggaeton, Venezuelan rock, Venezuelan hip hop, Venezuelan ska, Venezuelan electronic, Venezuelan pop, Venezuelan classical, etc.

== Travel requisites ==
- To enter the country a valid passport issued in the country of origin and return passage is required. Some countries may need a Visa.
- No special vaccinations are required to enter the country. Those traveling to jungle areas or want more protection can be vaccinated against yellow fever, malaria and cholera, after medical advice. It is advisable to take precautions to get vaccinated if it visit places like the Amazon rainforest or the Gran Sabana.
- In most of the country the weather is hot, but bearable. It is suggested to bring light clothing, but it is always good to include a sweater or light jacket. If the destination is the Venezuelan Andes, it is important to bring warm clothes, if possible balaclavas, caps and/or gloves .
- Most of the tourists arrive at Maiquetía Simón Bolívar International Airport, but there are another 5 airports in some cities of the country, covering international destinations.

=== Money exchange ===
Currently in Venezuela there is an exchange control imposed by the national government since 2003. The exchange rate varies following government directives, but due to the economical crisis, rules and policies may change frequently. Moreover, there is a foreign exchange market called "parallel market" or "black market"; the prices of the dollar in this market can be very different compared with the government exchange rate.

== Weather ==
Weather changes in Venezuela by region are drastic, example, in the Médanos de Coro temperatures can reach up to 40 °C, but in Méridan moors or the Sierra Nevada temperatures may be less than 0 °C.

== See also ==
- List of national parks of Venezuela
