= Tania Harcourt-Cooze =

English model and actress

The Honourable Tania Rosamund Harcourt-Cooze is an English model and actress.

== Early life and education ==
The daughter of Major William Duke Coleridge, 5th Baron Coleridge of Ottery St Mary, a Major in the Coldstream Guards, and his first wife Everild Tania Hambrough, she is related to the poet Samuel Taylor Coleridge.

She was raised in Devon, Harcourt-Cooze followed her father's British Army career until her parents divorced in 1977, when she was 11.

== Career ==
=== Modelling ===
Harcourt-Cooze completed an art history and drama degree at Fine Arts College in London.

She was spotted by Sarah Doukas, who dispatched her in 1986 to model for Armani and Versace in Italy, and she became a muse for Helmut Newton. She starred opposite singer George Michael in the video for "Father Figure". She appeared in the music video of the Kane Roberts song "Twisted" and was the “power drill girl” in Van Halen's "Poundcake" video in 1991.

=== Management ===
Returning to England in 2001, she took over the management of The Chanter's House, the family's ancestral home in March 2002. The couple set up events management company Kubla Khan, through which to organise weddings, fashion shoots, residential art courses, exhibitions, house tours and cultural gatherings based around the house.

In October 2006, the increasing costs of maintaining the property caused the family trust to put the property up for sale and auction the contents.

== Media ==
She came to public prominence again in 2008 with the airing of the fly-on-the-wall documentary, Willie's Wonky Chocolate Factory, centred on her husband's efforts to be one of the first Britons since the Cadbury family to grow, import and produce their own chocolate.

== Personal life ==
She married Willie Harcourt-Cooze, a Burmese-Irish man, in 1993 after meeting him in her late teens. Using the funds from the sale of his London flat and his family's money, the couple purchased a 1,000 acres (400 ha) cocoa farm, in the Venezuelan cloud forest, Hacienda El Tesoro in the Henri Pittier National Park, near Choroni Beach, and planted more than 50,000 Criollo cocoa trees.

She lives in Tiverton, Devon and has three children – Sophia, William and Eve. In May 2010 she and her husband separated and they formalised a divorce in 2011.

== See also ==
- Baron Coleridge
- Ottery St Mary
