= William Harcourt =

William Harcourt may refer to:

- William Vernon Harcourt (scientist) (1789–1871), British scientist
- William Harcourt (politician) (1827–1904), British Liberal politician
- William Harcourt (martyr), Catholic martyr, victim of the Titus Oates plot
- William Harcourt, villain in the film Alien Nation (named for the people above)
- William Harcourt, 3rd Earl Harcourt, English nobleman and soldier
- William Harcourt (MP for Berkshire), in 1491, MP for Berkshire (UK Parliament constituency)
- William Harcourt, 2nd Viscount Harcourt

== See also ==
- Willie Harcourt-Cooze, entrepreneur and chocolatier
