= Girardot Municipality, Aragua =

Girardot Municipality Municipio Girardot
- Municipality
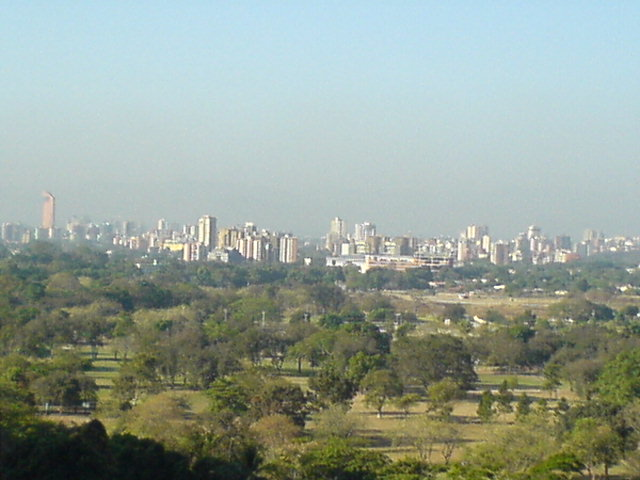
- Skyline of Maracay, shire town of the Girardot Municipality.

- Flag Coat of arms

- Location in Aragua

- Location in Venezuela
- Coordinates: 10°21′07″N 67°35′02″W
- Country: Venezuela
- State: Aragua
- Municipal seat: Maracay

Government
  - Mayor: Rafael Morales Cazorla (PSUV)

Area
  - Total: 341.6 km^{2} (131.9 sq mi)

Population (2011)
  - Total: 407,109
  - Density: 1,192/km^{2} (3,087/sq mi)
- Time zone: UTC−4 (VET)
- Area code(s): 0243
- Website: Official website

The Girardot Municipality is one of the 18 municipalities (municipios) that makes up the Venezuelan state of Aragua. According to the 2011 census by the National Institute of Statistics of Venezuela, the municipality has a population of 407,109. The city of Maracay is the shire town of the Girardot Municipality.

== History ==
The city of Maracay was officially established on March 5, 1701, by Bishop Diego de Baños y Sotomayor in the valleys of Tocopio and Tapatapa (what is known today as the central valley of Aragua) in northern Venezuela. According to the most accepted explanation, it was named after a local indigenous chief, and refers to the "Maracayo" (Felis mitis), a small tiger. Alternative etymologies cite a local aromatic tree called Mara.

Maracay experienced rapid growth during Juan Vicente Gómez's dictatorship (1908 - 1935). Gómez saw Maracay as a suitable place to make his residence during his rule, and ordered the construction of an Arc of Triumph, a bull plaza (a near replica of the one in Seville, Spain), an opera house, a zoo, and, most notably, the Hotel Jardín (Garden Hotel), a majestic, tourist attraction with very large gardens. The city is home to the Mausoleo de Gómez (Gómez's mausoleum), where the dictator's remains are stored.

== Geography ==
The mountains on the north side of Maracay, that separate it from the coast, make up the Henri Pittier National Park, named after the Swiss naturalist that studied them. The park is a very lush rainforest, with a great variety of ferns. Two very winding roads cut through the park over the mountains to the coast. One, beginning at the North-Central part of the city known as Urbanización El Castaño, goes to the beach town of Choroní. The other, beginning at the North-Western part of the city known as Urbanización El Limón, goes to Ocumare de la Costa and the beaches of Cata and Catica.

== Maracay & the Military ==
Maracay is a city heavily influenced by the military. Maracay is the cradle of Venezuelan aviation, and it is home to the two largest Air Force bases in the country. The Venezuelan F-16 fighter planes are stationed here, as well as the new Sukhoi-30MKEs acquired by the Venezuelan Government.

Other military facilities include the Fourth Armored Division of the Army and the Venezuelan Paratroopers main base and training center.

It is also home to the government-owned ammunition and weapons factory (CAVIM) that produces the Venezuelan version of the FN FAL (Fusil Automatique Leger - Light Automatic Rifle) rifle and will produce the newly acquired AK-103s; as well as the ammunition for both models.

== Economy ==
One of the most important cities in Venezuela, Maracay is primarily an industrial and commercial center, the city produces paper, textiles, chemicals, tobacco, cement, cattle derived foods, such as milk or meat conserves, as well as soap and perfumes.

Even though it is an industrial center, the surroundings of Maracay live of an intensive agriculture, where sugarcane, tobacco, coffee, and cocoa stand out as the main products. There are also cattle-herding and timber-cutting activities.

Activity by the Venezuelan Military also adds a great deal to Maracay's economy.

== Demographics ==
The Girardot Municipality, according to a 2007 population estimate by the National Institute of Statistics of Venezuela, has a population of 439,947 (up from 407,862 in 2000). This amounts to 26.4% of the state's population. The municipality's population density is 1,456.78 inhabitants per square kilometre (3,773.0/sq mi).

== Government ==
The mayor of the Girardot Municipality is Pedro Bastidas, elected on November 23, 2008 with 46% of the vote. He replaced Humberto Prieto shortly after the elections. The municipality is divided into eight parishes; Choroní, Urbana Las Delicias, Urbana Madre María de San José, Urbana Joaquín Crespo, Urbana Pedro José Ovalles, Urbana José Casanova Godoy, Urbana Andrés Eloy Blanco, and Urbana Los Tacariguas (the Urbana Las Delicias, Urbana Madre María de San José, Urbana Joaquín Crespo, Urbana Pedro José Ovalles, Urbana José Casanova Godoy, Urbana Andrés Eloy Blanco, and Urbana Los Tacariguas parishes once conformed the Capital Girardot Municipality, which was disestablished effective December 16, 1997).

== Education ==
Maracay houses the Faculty of Veterinarians and Agronomy of the Universidad Central de Venezuela, and an extension of the Universidad de Carabobo.

The main Campus of the UNEFA (a military university open to civilians) is located here. Career choices include Electronics, Aeronautical and Civil Engineering, as well as other disciplines such as avionics.

The main museums are:

- The Anthropological Museum.
- The Aviation Museum.
- The Museum of Modern Arts "Mario Abreu".
- The Opera House.

== Transportation ==
Maracay has good transportation facilities and infrastructure that effectively connects it to the rest of the country, it is linked to most other important localities by the Autopista Regional del Centro (Central Regional Highway), it also has good access to the only, small railway system in the country. The city boasts the national Hidroplane airport, located on the shore of the Lago de Valencia (Lake Valencia). The city does not have a Subway system, but one is in the planning stages.

== Culture ==
=== Media ===
==== TV Stations ====
- TVS
- TRV (Orbivisión)
- Coloewr TV
- Televisión Informativa del Centro (TIC TV)
- Novavisión TV
- Aragua TV

==== Newspapers ====
- El Aragüeño
- El Periodiquito
- El Siglo
- El Impreso

== See also ==
- Maracay
- Aragua
- Municipalities of Venezuela
