= Willie Harcourt-Cooze =

British-based chocolate maker and entrepreneur (born 1964)

William George Harcourt-Cooze (born 29 April 1964) is a British-based chocolate maker and entrepreneur. He came to public prominence in 2008 with the airing of the Channel 4 fly-on-the-wall documentary, Willie's Wonky Chocolate Factory, which centred on his efforts to grow, import and produce his own chocolate.

== Early life ==
Born in London to a Burmese father and Irish mother, he has two younger, and two older sisters, as well as a younger brother. His father fled Burma during the Second World War. When Willie was four his father bought Horse Island on the south west coast of Ireland between Ballydehob and Schull, where his father started farming and living a self-sufficient life.

He attended school in Waterford, Ireland. Returning to England aged eleven, he was unhappy and returned to Ireland after a year where he attended a comprehensive school in Cork. After completing basic schooling there, he moved back to England again to study for his A-levels and was considering following in his father's footsteps and becoming a property developer. In 1982, whilst on a night out with some friends, he was stabbed by an unknown assailant, but made a good recovery. Soon after this happened, he received the news that his father had died. He decided to travel and visited Australia, Peru and the Far East.

== Chocolate ==
After marrying Tania Coleridge, they honeymooned, trekking on horseback in Venezuela where, in 1993, whilst speaking to a beach umbrella salesman he was directed to the 1,000 acres (400 ha) cocoa farm, in the Venezuelan cloud forest, Hacienda El Tesoro in the Henri Pittier National Park, near Choroni Beach.

They eventually decided to sell his flat in London, and emigrated to Venezuela to purchase El Tesoro. They planted more than 50,000 cacao trees of the Criollo cultivar, and built up an eco-tourism venture. In 1998 he started making 100% cacao bars for locals from the farm, with moulds made from a clay pipe.

In 2007, they returned to the UK.

In 2008, after being falsely accused, investigated and cleared by the regime of Hugo Chavez for exploitation of locals, they mothballed the farm temporarily.

Relocating to a rented property in Devon, England, after several years of assembling suitable equipment, and the resumption of cocoa farming, he began production in 2007 in Uffculme, Devon, filmed by Channel 4. In 2008 the TV show was recommissioned for a second series, the follow-up series Willie's Chocolate Revolution: Raising the Bar, aired on Channel 4 on 7–9 April 2009 which followed Harcourt-Cooze's attempt to introduce a high-cacao dark chocolate bar to the British market.

In the television series and beyond he has advocated a Bean-to-Bar approach, growing and sourcing his own cacao beans for production.

In December 2020, he appeared on Off Menu with Ed Gamble and James Acaster podcast alongside Joe Thomas discussing his method for cooking lamb as featured on Willie's Perfect Chocolate Christmas.

== Personal life ==
Harcourt-Cooze has three children and lives in Tiverton, Devon In 2010 he and his wife, Tania Harcourt-Cooze divorced.

== Filmography ==
Year	Title	Role
2008	Willie's Wonky Chocolate Factory	Self
2008	Willie's Perfect Chocolate Christmas	Self
2009	Willie's Chocolate Revolution: Raising the Bar	Self
2011	Studio One	Guest
2015	The Living Room	Guest

== See also ==
- List of bean-to-bar chocolate manufacturers
