= Willie's Wonky Chocolate Factory =

British television documentary series

Willie's Wonky Chocolate Factory is a United Kingdom television documentary series broadcast on Channel 4 in March 2008. Filmed in "fly-on-the-wall" style, it shows the efforts of Willie Harcourt-Cooze to establish a brand of 100% cacao chocolate in the UK.

The series centres on "Willie" Harcourt-Cooze, assisted by his wife Tania Harcourt-Cooze née Coleridge, who aims to grow high quality cacao beans on his farm in Venezuela, and then process them in the UK into luxury chocolate products.

The Guardian called it a "fascinating series" while being critical of Harcourt-Cooze for not doing his manufacture nearer to the source of the beans, which would ensure more money remained in South America. Hugo Chavez reportedly made similar criticisms of the chocolatier.

A follow-up series, Willie's Chocolate Revolution: Raising the Bar, aired on Channel 4 over three consecutive nights, 7–9 April 2009. This followed Willie's attempt to introduce a high-cacao chocolate bar, "Delectable", in the British market.
