= Bahía de Cata =

Beach in Venezuela

Coordinates: 10°29′33″N 67°44′21″W

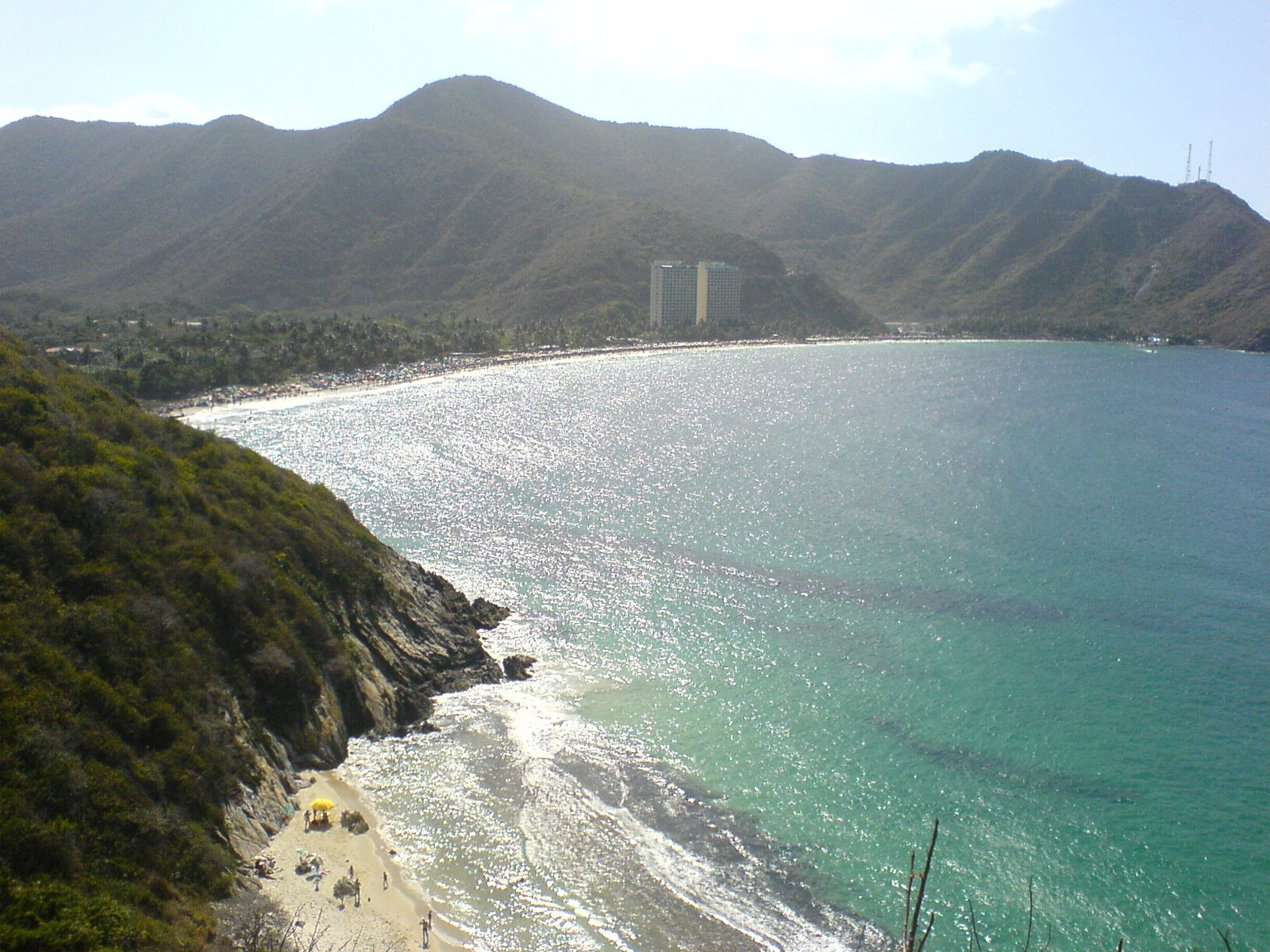
Bahía de Cata.

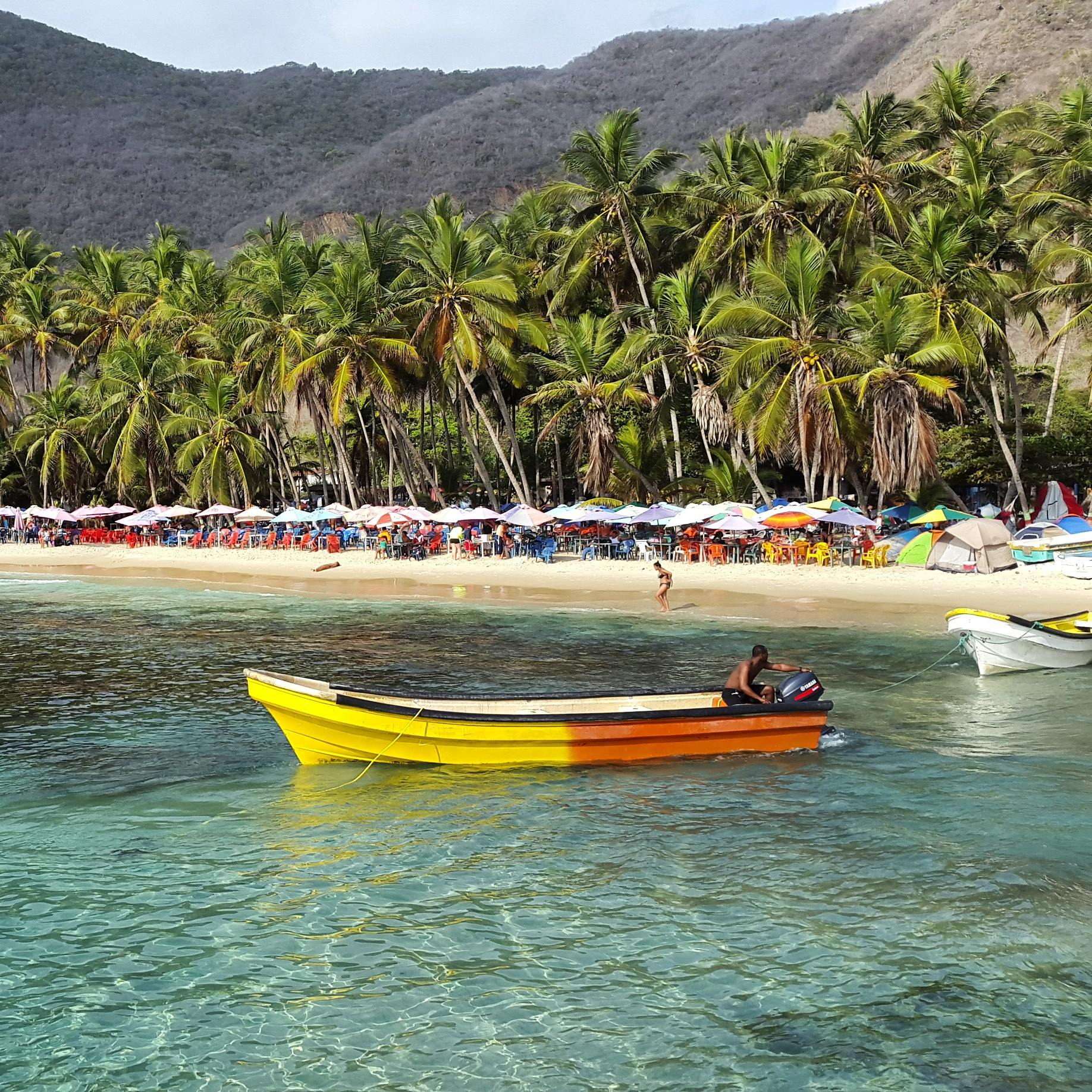
Boaters in the bay his main job is fishing and in seasons made travel carrying tourists to Catica and La Ciénaga.

Bahía de Cata (Bay of Cata) is a beach of Aragua state (Venezuela), of large size, fine sand, clear waters and adorned by the shadow of upright coconut trees. Bahía de Cata has become a seaside area of great concurrence. It has cabins and restaurants and is located 58 km from Maracay along the road of El Limón.

With a town of 3,500 inhabitants and only 53 km from Maracay, besides of Bahía de Cata, the Araguan coast has beaches like Catica, La Ensenada de Juan Andrés and Cuyagua, Ensenadas de Chuao, Café, Puerto Maya and La Ciénaga de Ocumare, to which is accessed only by boat or by hiking through the Henri Pittier National Park.

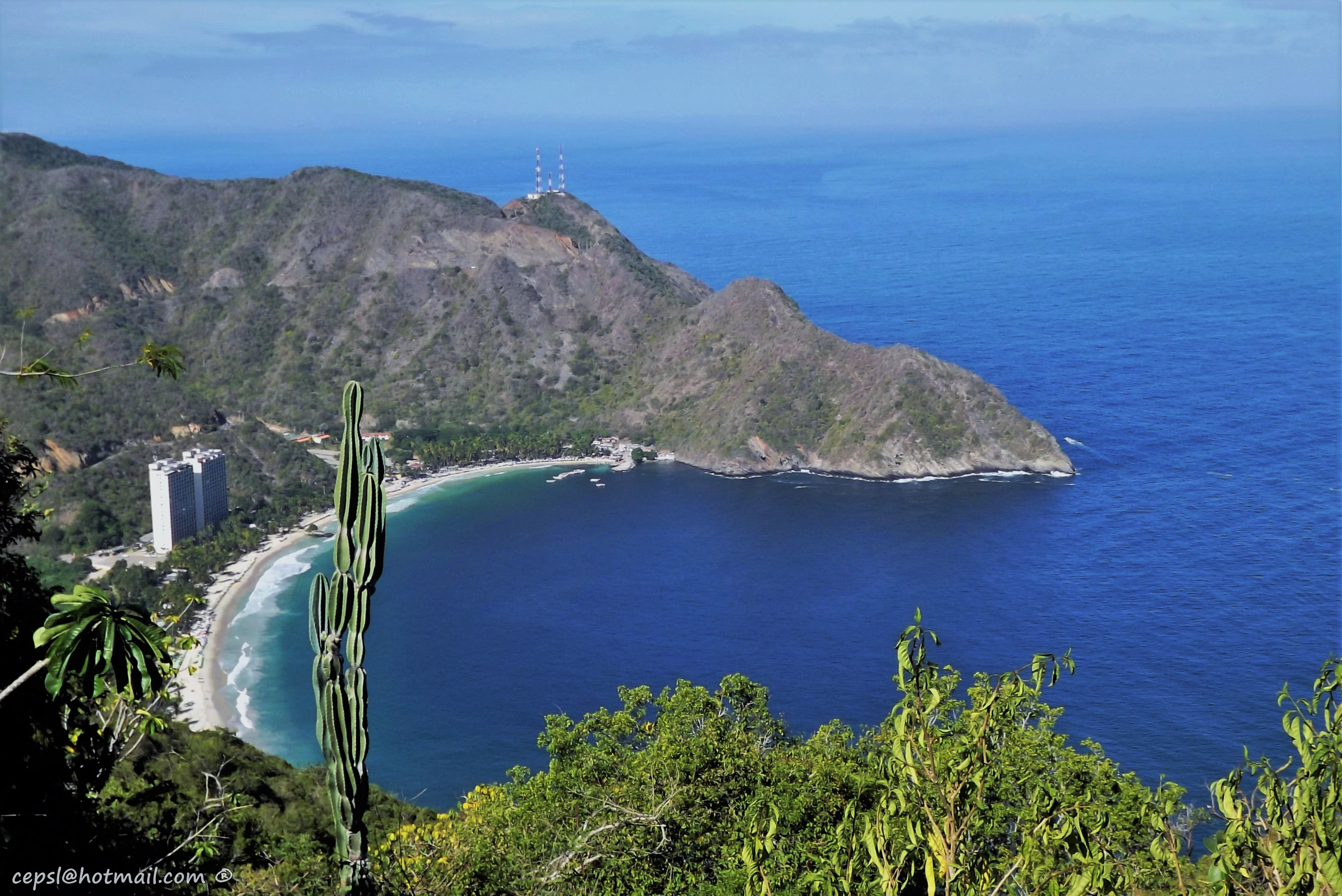
Aragua coast, beautiful view of the Bahía de Cata, from the lookout on the road to Cuyagua beach
