= Cascada del Vino =

Waterfall in Venezuela

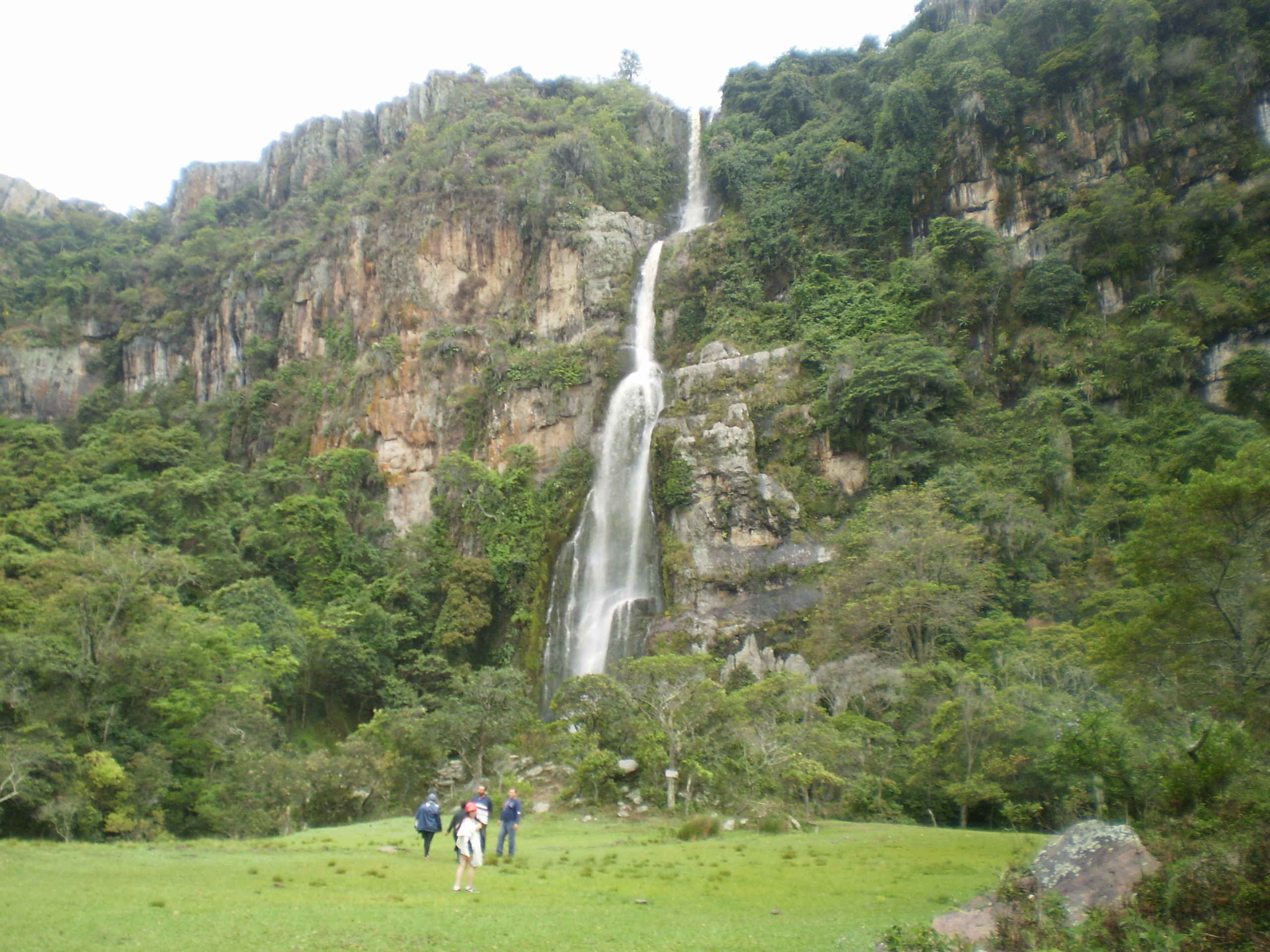
Cascada del Vino

Cascada del Vino is a Venezuelan water fall with the peculiar feature that the river has a tinged of burgundy-colored product of an organic compound, tannic acid derived from the roots of the trees surrounding the creek along its path . The waterfall is located in the Dinira National Park, on the edge of town Moran Lara State, in the mountains of Barbecue a mountain range that is part of the eastern region of the Venezuelan Andes.

== Conservation ==
The low population density in the regions near the Dinira National Park and the absence of human communities within the park have definitely helped Dinira is an area with well-preserved ecosystems. The rugged terrain and lack of roads also contribute to maintaining the secluded park and, therefore, free from external problems threatening nature.

Comparing data Dinira National Park with other national parks, forest fires do not appear to be a serious problem. However, these fires cause alterations that have great impact on paramo vegetation and subpáramo and many endemic species in the area.

The waterfall of wine is a recreation area visited by the inhabitants of the region, although unregulated tourism, especially during the carnival season and Holy Week, when, though the exact number of visitors is unknown due to lack of records, it is estimated during each holiday brings about 2,500 people to the area

The main challenge of this large number of visitors is the notorious accumulation of debris around the waterfall and some illegal or improper activities like graffiti, logging, fires, vandalism, etc.

== Journey ==
To reach the Cascada del Vino from Barquisimeto take the road Quíbor–El Tocuyo, which divides: the road to the left is the Pan American route is taken towards Trujillo, passing through the towns of San Pedro, La Pastora and soap until, after about 45 minutes to the town of Barbacoas, where only 10 minutes is the Cascada del Vino.

Take the road to the right at the fork in the road Quíbor–Tocuyo leads to a preference for rustic road cars, as trails are formed by curved stone at the edge of the mountains.

== See also ==
- Tourism in Venezuela
