= Choroní =

Coastal locality in Aragua state, Venezuela

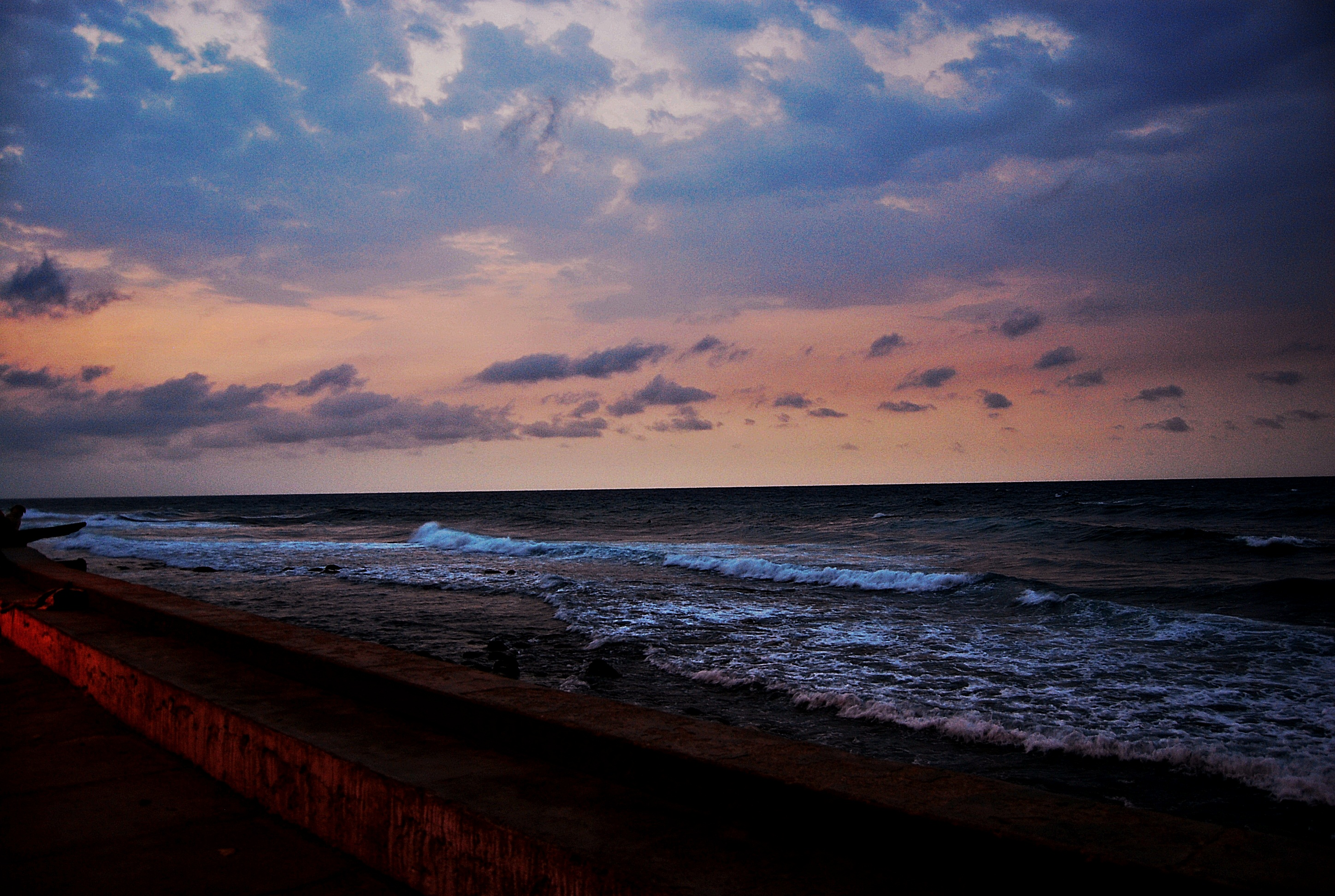

- Location within Venezuela
- Coordinates: 10°30′N 67°37′W
- Country: Venezuela
- State: Aragua
- Municipality: Girardot

Population (2004)
  - Total: 5,815
- Time zone: UTC−4 (VET)

Choroní is a coastal locality in the far north of the municipality of Girardot, Aragua state, Venezuela. It is located on the outskirts of the coastal mountain range. This mountain range makes up the essence of the Henri Pittier National Park. The word "Choroní" originates from the name of the natives who inhabited the valley at the time of the Spanish settlement.

Choroní's population is estimated at under 5,000. Major industries consist of fishing, growing cacao, and tourism. Tourism has taken on major importance over the last decade.
