= Henri Pittier National Park =

Oldest national park in Venezuela

- IUCN category II (national park)
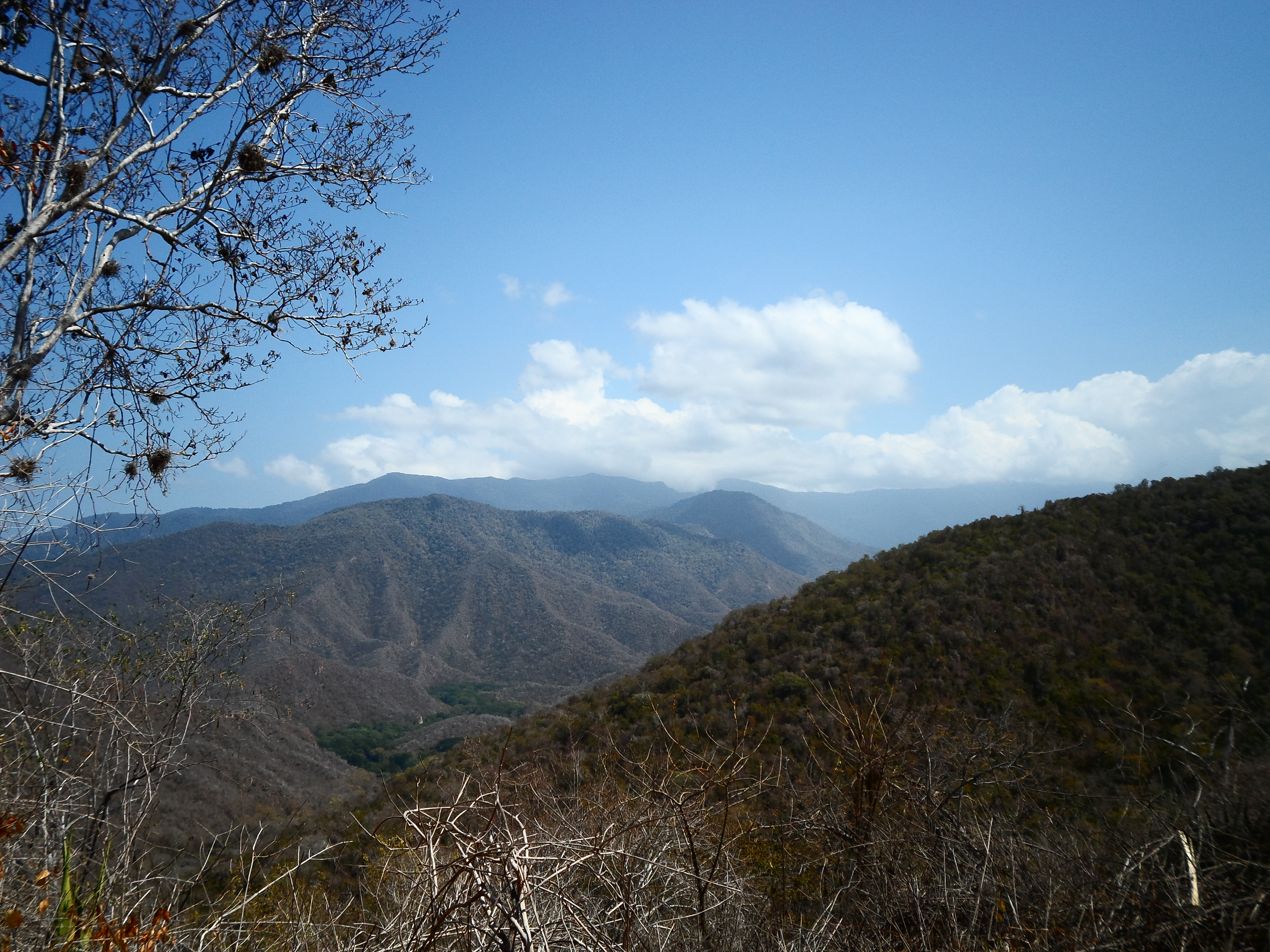

- Location within Venezuela
- Nearest city: Maracay
- Coordinates: 10.380°N 67.619°W
- Area: 1,078 km^{2} (416 sq mi)
- Established: 13 February 1937
- Governing body: INPARQUES
- Website: www.inparques.gob.ve/index.php?parques=view&codigo=pn_0001&sec=1

Henri Pittier National Park is the oldest national park in Venezuela, originally created in 1937 under the name of Rancho Grande by decree of President Eleazar López Contreras. In 1953 the park was renamed in honor of Henri Pittier, a distinguished Swiss geographer, botanist and ethnologist, who arrived in Venezuela in 1917, classified more than 30,000 plants in the country and devoted many years studying the flora and fauna in the park.

Henri Pittier National Park has the honor of having started the history of national parks of Venezuela. Its 107,800 hectares, located in the north of Aragua state, comprise most of the Araguan coast and mountainous area of Carabobo state. It also borders San Esteban National Park. Henri Pittier National Park is the largest among the national parks of the Venezuelan Coastal Range.

The park consists of two geographic systems: a steep mountainous interior where there are more than 500 bird species and 22 endemic species and a coastal area with bays, beaches and resorts with huge tourism potential. There is a great diversity of flora and fauna. The park is an Important Bird Area. and is an Alliance for Zero Extinction (AZE) site.

With its nine major rivers, the park is an important source of water for surrounding cities and towns. It also contains land where some of the most highly-acclaimed cacao in the world is cultivated, especially in the village of Chuao.

== History ==
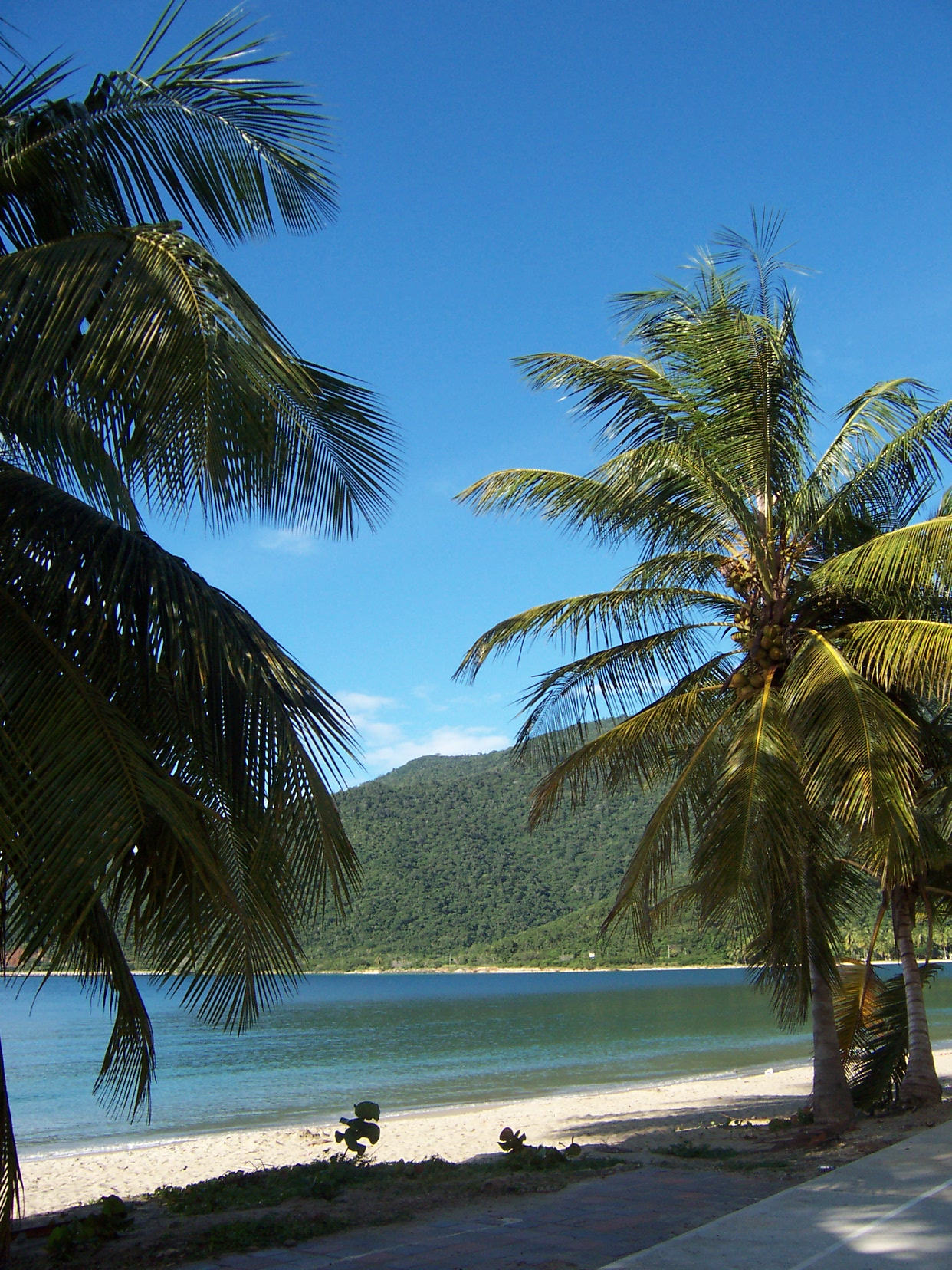
Turiamo Beach, located in the coastal zone of Henri Pittier National Park

Decreed National Park on February 13, 1937 and originally christened with the name of Rancho Grande, under the chairmanship of General Eleazar López Contreras, became the first national park status in the country.

Subsequently, on May 24, 1953 was renamed Henri Pittier, a distinguished Swiss engineer, naturalist and botanist founder of the system of national parks of Venezuela, who managed the consolidation of the park and spent much of his life in the study of forest tropical ecosystem and thousands of species of plants and fauna in the park.

Although it initially was set at 90,000 ha of park, later in 1974 in the government of Carlos Andrés Pérez was appended another 17,800 ha, resulting in a total area of 107,800 ha, current geographic area of the park.

It was created in order to preserve the cloud forest ecosystems and marine-coastal and estuarine environments of the Venezuelan Coastal Range, threatened by burning and agricultural activities, and protect its biodiversity and the preservation of those endemic, rare, vulnerable or endangered species. It also protects important water resources that supply water to nearby towns and is a space for research, recreation and environmental education. Thus, the efforts of scientist Henri Pittier for the creation of the Park.

For years the park has been protected by the Instituto Nacional de Parques de Venezuela (INPARQUES), which assumes a systematic policy of conservation and preservation of natural resources of the park.

== Flora ==
It has a high diversity due to the large number of environments involved. The dwarf (Curatella americana, Bowdichia virgilioides), the majaguas (Heliocarpus sp.) And palo maría (Triplaris sp.) are characteristic of forests at lower altitudes. The bucket or child (Gyranthera caribensis) is indicative of the cloud forest as are macanilla palms (Bactris setulosa), cane mill (Chamaedorea pinnatifrons) Prapa (Wettinia praemorsa) and other genera like Geonoma, Hyospathe and Socratea. Aroids, orchids, bromeliads and Piperaceae include in the group of epiphytic plants.

== Water resources ==
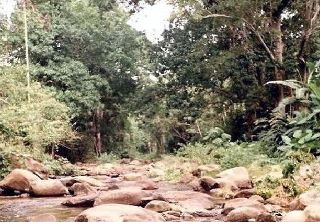
River Ocumare at level of La Trilla

The Rivers San Miguel, Turiamo, Ocumare, Cata, Cuyagua, Aroa, Cepe, Choroní, Chuao drain into the Caribbean Sea. The Rivers Guayabita, Colorado, Güey and Limón drain into the lake of Valencia.

Within the park are several recreational areas such as La Guamita, Las Cocuizas, La Trilla, El Polvorín; the Birds Pass of Portachuelo, the Museum of Uraca Hydroelectric Plant, the Hacienda de Santa María and the Viewpoints of the main roads Maracay-Choroní and Maracay-Ocumare de la Costa.

== Places to visit ==
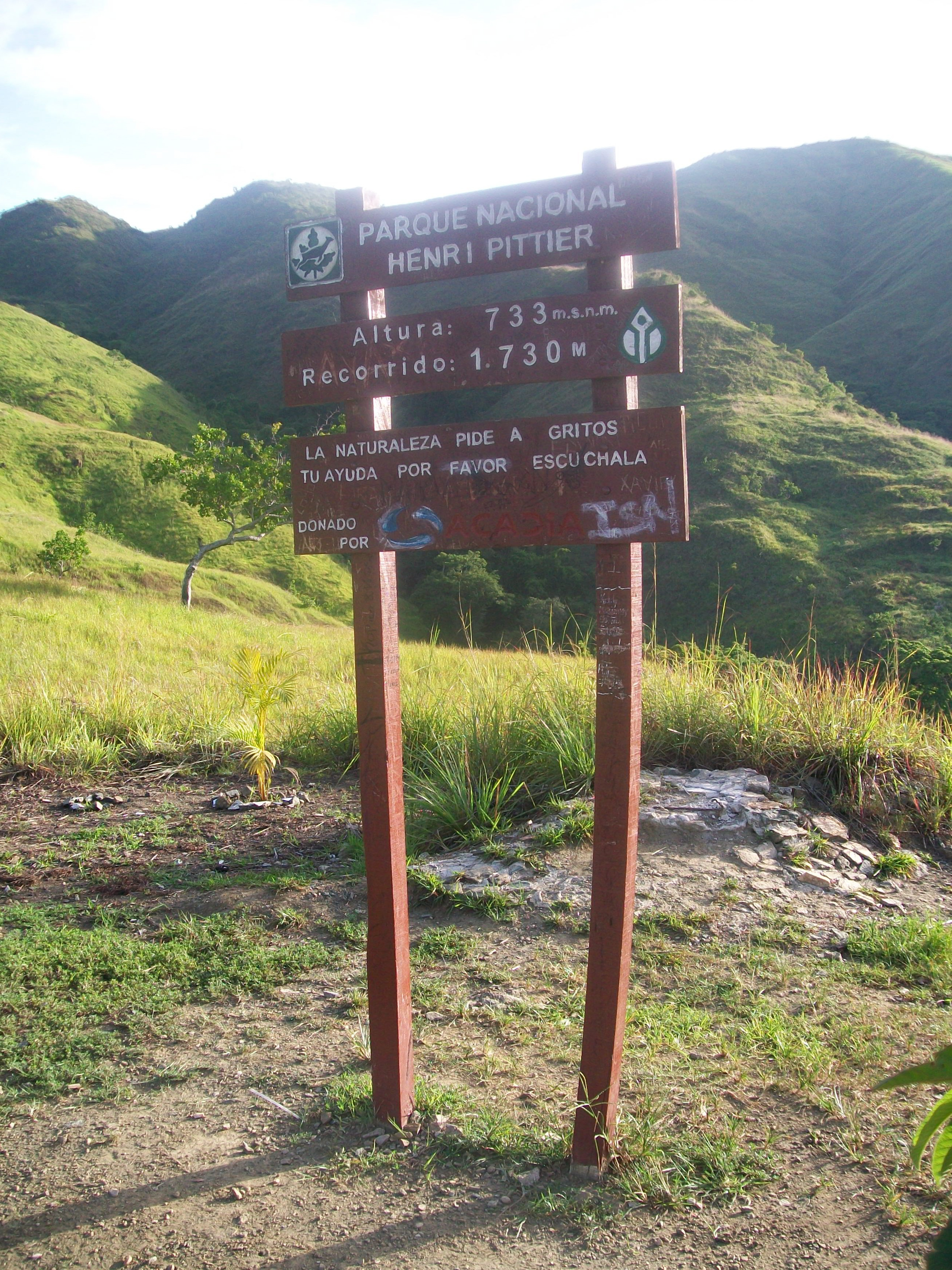
Entrance to Henri Pittier National Park west of the Marriott Maracay Golf Resort

The main attraction of this park are its beautiful beaches. Some are accessible by road, and it is noteworthy that so are most frequented by vacationers. Others are only accessible by sea, which are generally much more empty and clean. The most visited are: bahía de Cata, Cuyagua, Playa Grande, El Playón, Playa Chuao, among others. Playa Cuyagua is an ocean beach, considered the best to practice the «surfing» in Venezuela.

Another major attraction of the park are over 500 species of birds can be seen there. These represent over 40% of total bird species in the country. Tourists and scientists around the world visit the park for this reason, and thus created the Sociedad Científica Amigos del Parque Nacional Henri Pittier (SCAPNHP) in 1989. This society seeks to promote the study of flora and fauna of the park, while protecting of disturbing elements the natural habitat of these species. In the Estación Biológica Rancho Grande of the Ministry of Environment can visit a zoological museum with many of the species in the area by appointment. The Paseo del Pargo, which can be reached by taking Road of Choroní peaks can visit La Mesa, Palmarito, La Negra, La Negrita and El Cenizo.

== Geography ==
=== Location ===
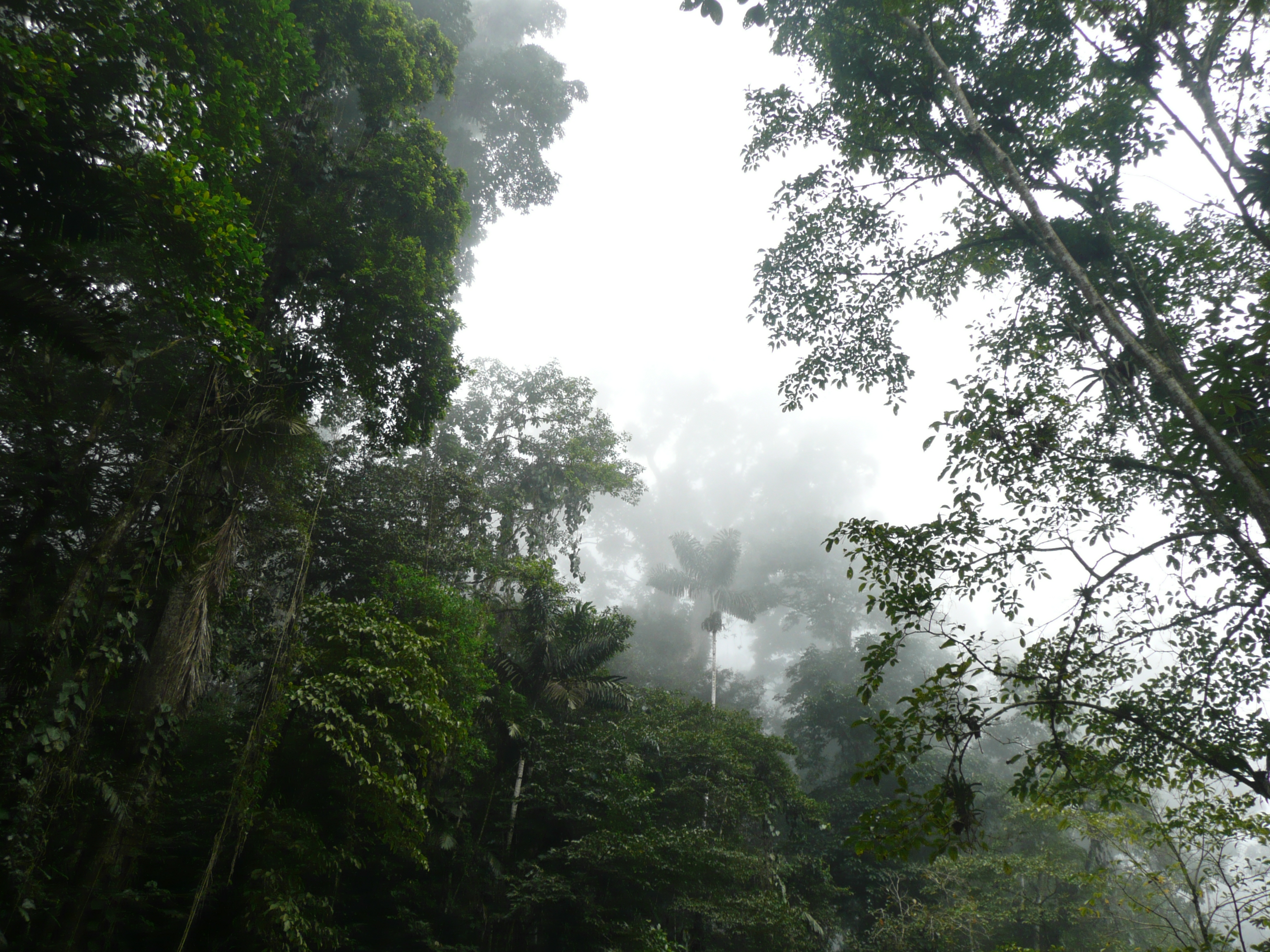
Cloud Forest

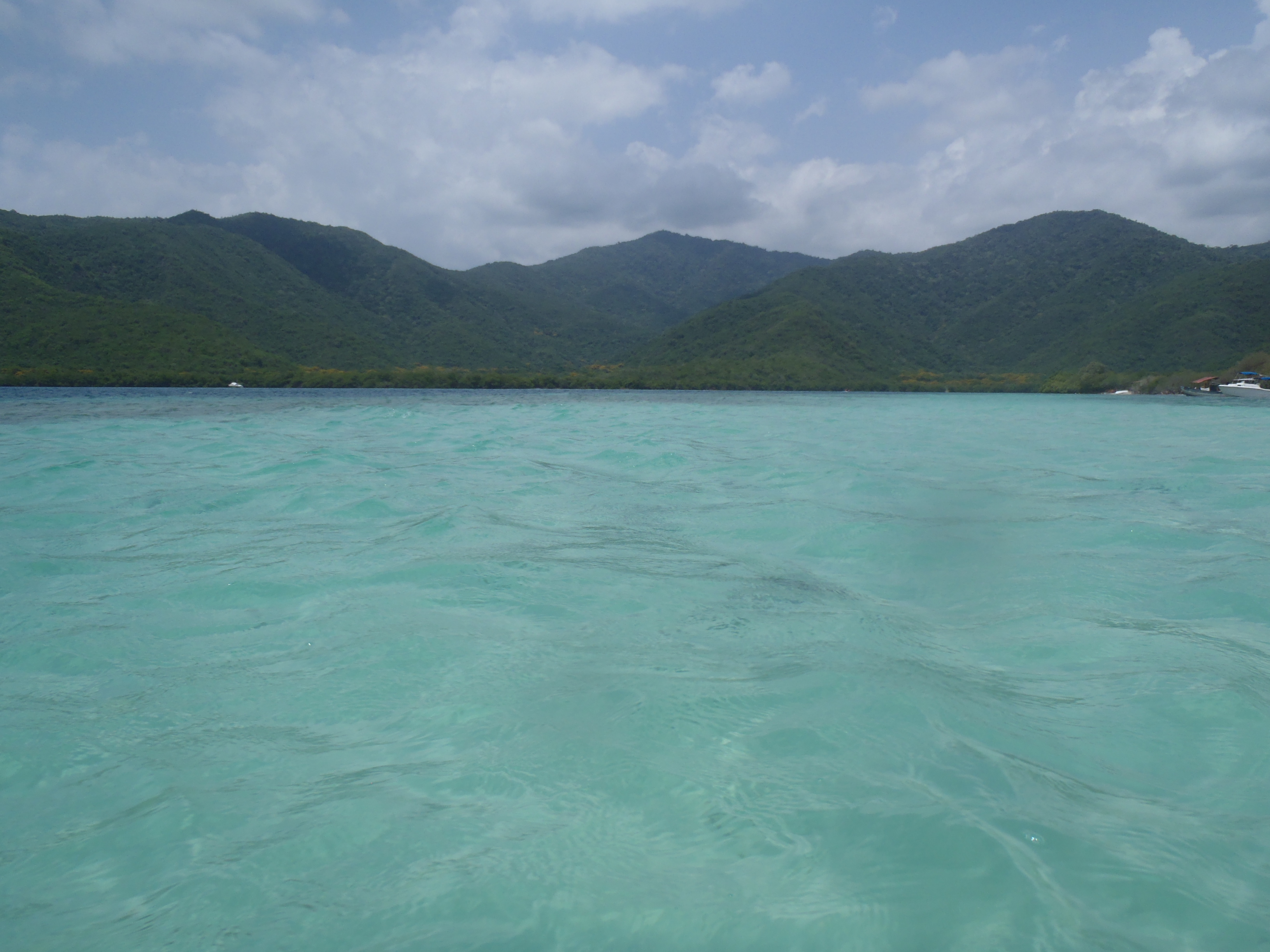
Beach

Henri Pittier National Park is located in the Central Region, occupies most of the northern state of Aragua and much of the northeastern state of Carabobo, covers a considerable area of the Venezuelan Coastal Range, adjacent to the towns of Choroní, Cuyagua, Chuao, Cata, La Ciénaga, Ocumare de la Costa y Turiamo.

The easiest access to the park is across the road from Maracay to El Limón, through Rancho Grande and down Ocumare de la Costa, and the road from Maracay to Las Delicias and reaches Choroní. From the Maracay Bus Terminal there are also buses that arrive to the town of Choroni.

=== Relief ===
Located in the Venezuelan Coastal Range, the park is a rugged terrain with steep slopes, starting at sea level and rises to 2,346 meters, where it reaches its highest point at Pico Cenizo.

The geological constitution of the park is essentially metamorphic igneous rock, the highest peak is 2,436 meters. Similarly, there are rocky shore environments.

One of the major geographical features is the presence of the mountain open to 1,136 meters, known as Paso de Portachuelo, which allows the passage of species of birds, bats and flying insects, many of them migrants from the northern hemisphere.

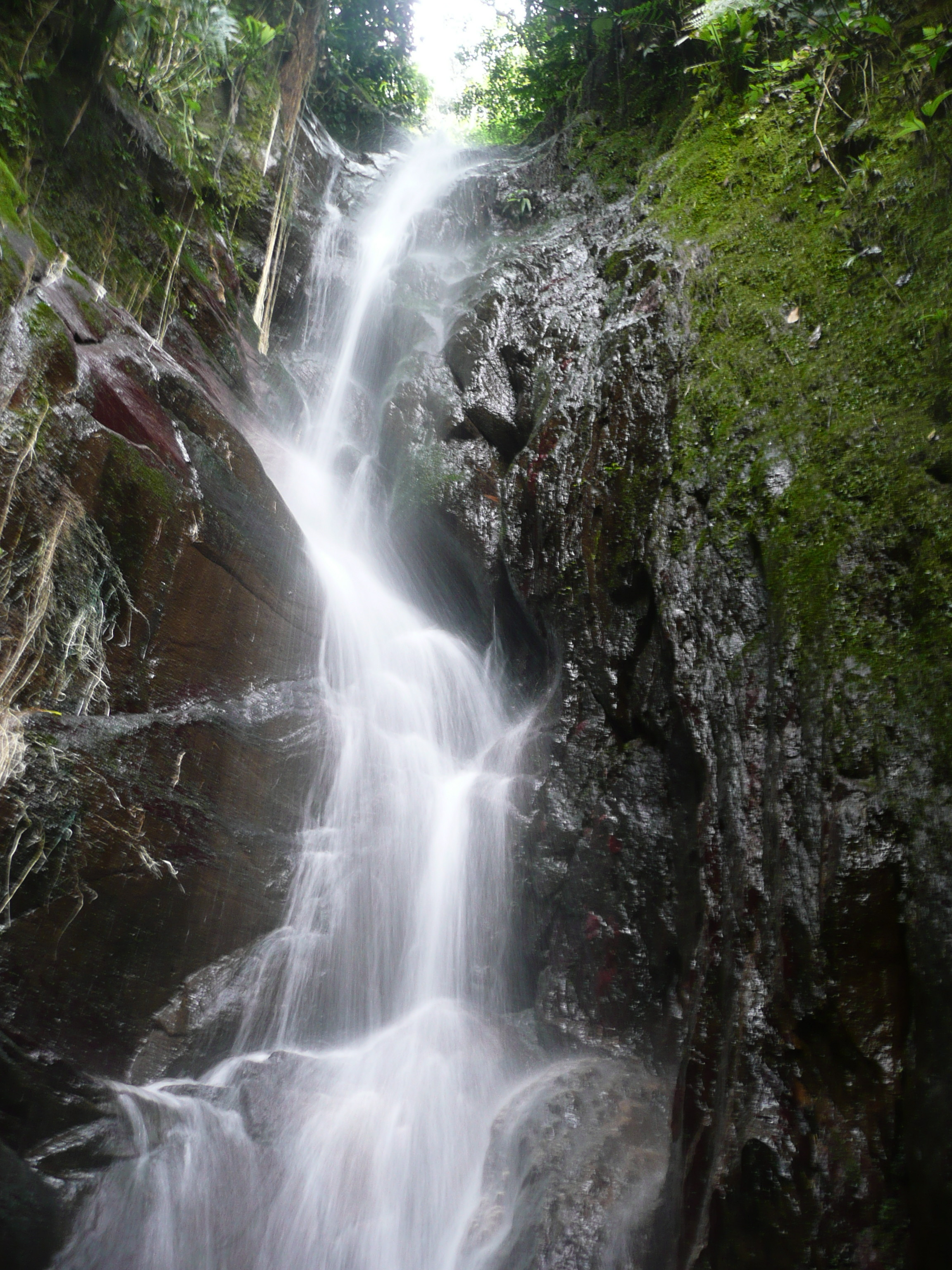
A waterfall in the National Park Henri Pittier

=== Vegetation ===
Plant communities of the Venezuelan Coastal Range, such as cloud forest, deciduous and galleries. Among them are species of orchids, bromeliads, palms and trees of great development as Gyranthera caribensis, known as "El niño" or "cucharón", which average about 40 m in height. There are also mangrove La Ciénaga and Turiamo Bay.

In deciduous forests are giant grass communities known as the "cogollo".

From the top to the valley is a high diversity of vegetation due to the large number of environments. The park is composed of four representative vegetables layers of the cloud forests from tall trees as climbers, shrubs of medium height, herbs and finally mosses, lichens, ferns and fungi.

=== Climate ===
As Henri Pittier Park a very steep topography, unstable or flat, the climate varies with altitude above sea level. The park is situated at an altitude ranging from 0 to 2,436 meters, its maximum height at the top of Pico El Cenizo. In the coastal system average temperature is 28 °C, with highs that may exceed 30 °C, while in the higher areas descend from 12 °C to 6 °C with high levels of precipitation during the rainy season between April and November.

== Ecology and habitat ==
=== Biodiversity ===
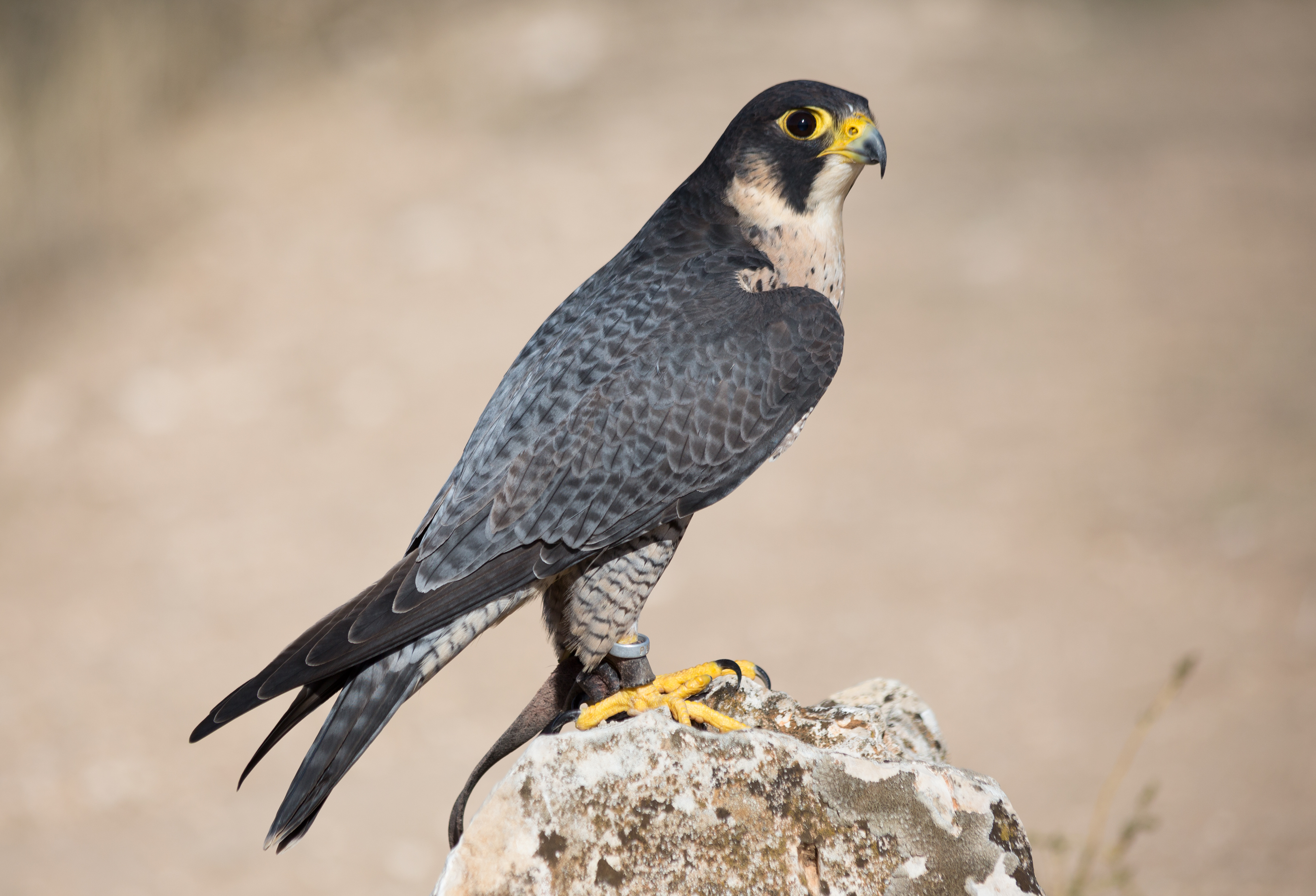
The peregrine falcon is an abundant species in the National Park Henri Pittier.

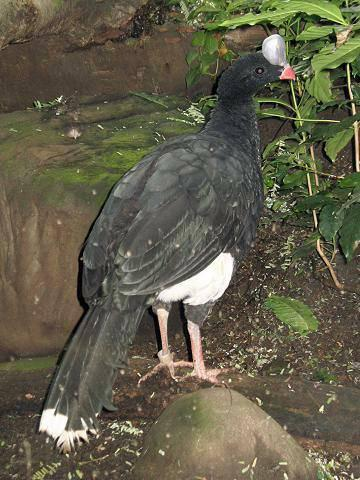
The helmeted curassow is one of the bird species considered threatened with extinction in the National Park Henri Pittier.

The park has a great biological diversity and belongs to the "hotspot" of the Tropical Andes. The most studied plant formation is the cloud forest which have been reported up to 150 different species of trees in an area of 0.25 ha, and where the "niño" or cucharón is the most representative tree species. The park has been reported about 140 species of mammals, 580 birds, 97 reptiles and 38 amphibians. It is estimated that the number of insects than one million species. Among the animal species are endangered birds like the cock of Wetmore, the goldfinch yellow face and the siskin, mammals such as the northern spider monkey, dog foxes and tapirs, and american crocodile, the striped frog and Hercules beetle. Several species of birds and mammals are emblematic of the park: the sorocuá, the beautiful granicera, the harpy eagle, puma, jaguar and howler monkey. In the area of Rancho Grande from the way of Ocumare de la Costa to the Biological Station Dr. Alberto Fernández Yépez, administered by the Central University of Venezuela, where since the 1940 is supported studies of the flora and fauna and other natural resources of the park. The station receives researchers from all over Venezuela and around the world fascinated by the extraordinary diversity of life in the cloud forests. Over the years the contributions of these scientists scattered in journals, books, articles and websites have made the PNHP is one of the best documented nationwide. As an example, the Audubon Society of Venezuela has over 10 years studying the migration of birds across the Paso Portachuelo. Students from around the country and the world use the station to develop practical teachers activities on many aspects of the park: zoology, botany, soils, geography, biogeography. Several courses are held annually, both nationally and internationally on selected aspects of the natural history of the cloud forest. The Andrew Field interpretive trail is subject of visits of communities and groups who must request the Inparques a guide to its use. Users of the station should contact to itself to make use of its infrastructure, and also apply for a permission of Inparques to enter at surrounding forest. Those who wish to conduct scientific research must also request permission from the Oficina Nacional de Diversidad Biológica, Ministry of Environment.

=== Threats ===
Currently the park has been described as "threatened" mainly by the degree of damage caused by fire, whether forest or produced by human factors, human encroachment have also contributed to the destruction of forest area. Excessive hunting of animals, the unconsciousness of the visitors to leave solid waste in the park and the lack of maintenance to the infrastructure have contributed to the degradation state of the park.

=== Fauna ===
In the park inhabit at least 582 species of birds, which means at least 43% of bird species in Venezuela and 6% of the world birdlife. A density of 5.4 species per 10 km ², one of the highest in the world.

The Paso Portachuelo is a major gateway for more than 79 species of migratory birds from the northern hemisphere.

Among the most representative genera of birds are: the peregrine falcon, the swift, the harpy eagle, the lonely eagle, the plain-flanked rail, the helmeted curassow, the chachalaca, the collared trogon , the military macaw and the siskin, just to name a few.

They have recorded 140 species of mammals, representing 47% of the mammal fauna in Venezuela. Larger groups are represented by the bats, followed by rodents and carnivores, among them are the tapir, the peccary, the sloth, the anteater, the howler monkey, the giant otter, the ocelot, the puma, the tailed deer, the agouti, the paca and the water rat.

Among the reptiles have been recorded 97 species and 38 amphibians, both types of animals include the american crocodile located at the mouth of the San Miguel river, sea turtles, rattlesnakes and other species of toads and frogs of tropical forests.

It is estimated that live more than a million species of insects, and has never computes all insect species in the park.

=== Endangered species ===
In recent years the populations of many species that inhabit the park have been reduced, some extinct or virtually extinct.

Have classified three levels of threat in the park, about the danger of extinction:

- In the Lower Level of risk distinguishes the cougar, a species considered as Near Threatened in the world
- In the Degree of Vulnerable are species like the jaguar, the tapir, the military macaw, among other
- In the Degree of Endangered is the northern spider monkey, the helmeted curassow, the american alligator, the white turtle, etc.

== Attractions and recreation ==
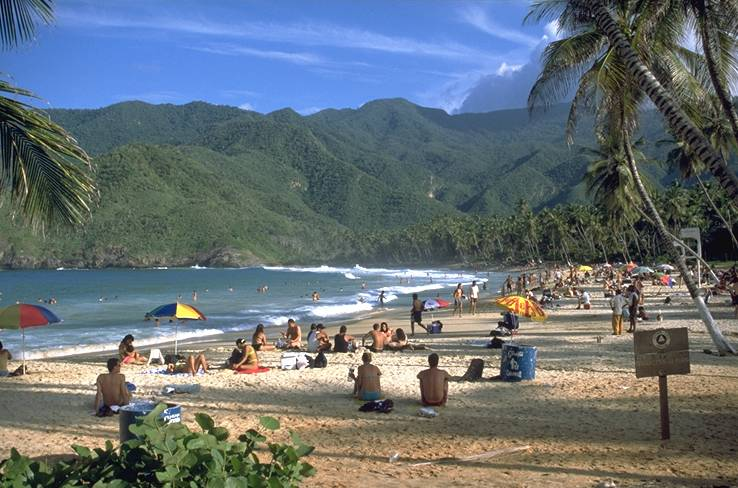
In the foreground Choroni Beach, center of major tourist attractions of its own and foreign, the bottom part of the Venezuelan Coastal Range

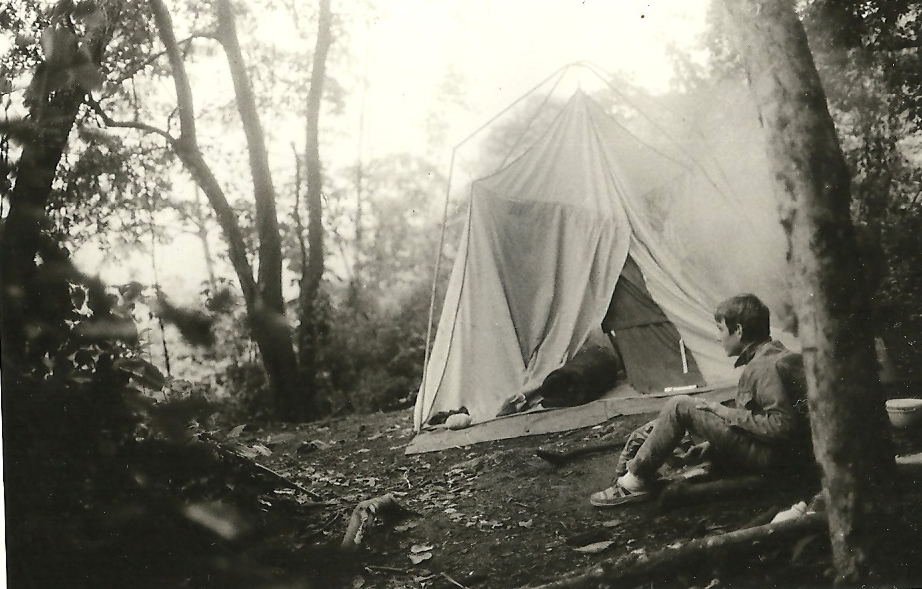
Youth camping in an area of the Henri Pittier National Park known as Aguatal, east of the Urb. El Castaño, Maracay

The Paseo del Pargo or Paseo Guanábano, is a way westbound that through to the largest mountain formations of the Coastal range which runs through the park, to the summit of Pico La Mesa. In the Estación Biológica de Rancho Grande is located a biological museum, with a zoo of species that inhabit the park.

However, the biggest attraction of the Park is its beaches, some are accessible by land, while the more isolated and quiet can be accessible by sea, in boats, motorboats or yachts. Some of the most valuable for its tourism and recreational potential are:

- Maracay Fourth most populous city.
- Bahía de Cata clear waters and peaceful
- Cuyagua beach suitable for extreme sports like surfing, bodyboarding and windsurfing
- La Ciénaga Beaches in flat water, with coral, suitable for diving, snorkeling and kayaking
- Choroni beach, El Playón, among others beaches.
- Zoo Las Delicias, among others.

The mountainous area of the park is an excellent setting for bird watching, and they that dwell therein 6.5% of the world's birds, and other endemic species that live in the Henri Pittier.

As the area is protected, managed and operated by INPARQUES, there are no hotels or inns for lodging or accommodation of tourists. However, the park is located adjacent to the peoples of Choroní, Cata, Cuyagua and Ocumare de la Costa where there are several cottages and tourist lodges, there is also the option of camping when the tourist seeks permission to INPARQUES.
