= Cuyagua =

Town located on the coast of Aragua state, Venezuela

- Town
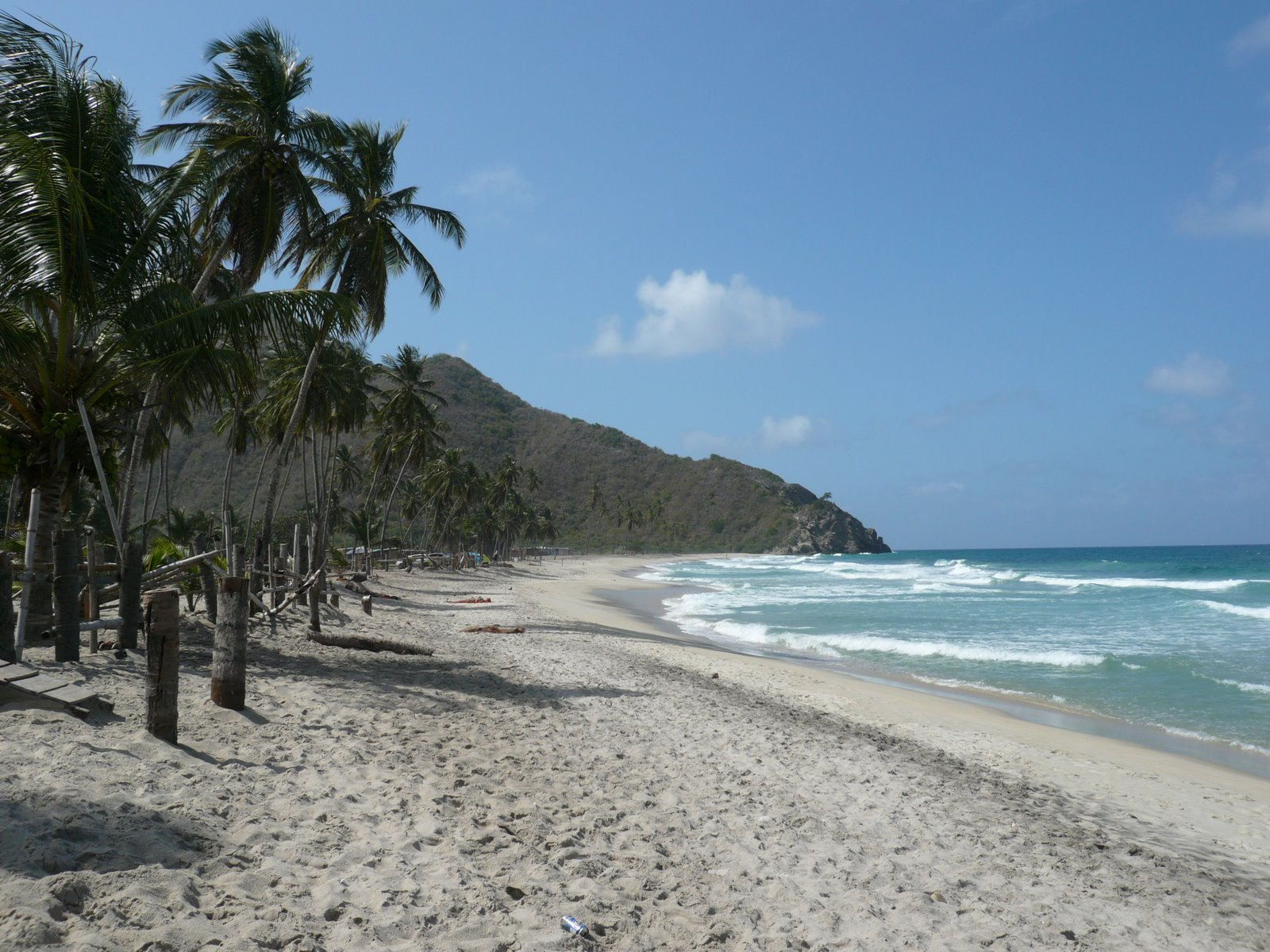

- Location within Venezuela
- Coordinates: 10°29′N 67°42′W
- Country: Venezuela
- State: Aragua
- Time zone: UTC−4 (VET)

Cuyagua is a town located on the coast of Aragua state, Venezuela, noted for having a beach with heavy waves that is enjoyed by surfers. Among its rivers are Pozo de Arena and Pozo San Pedro.

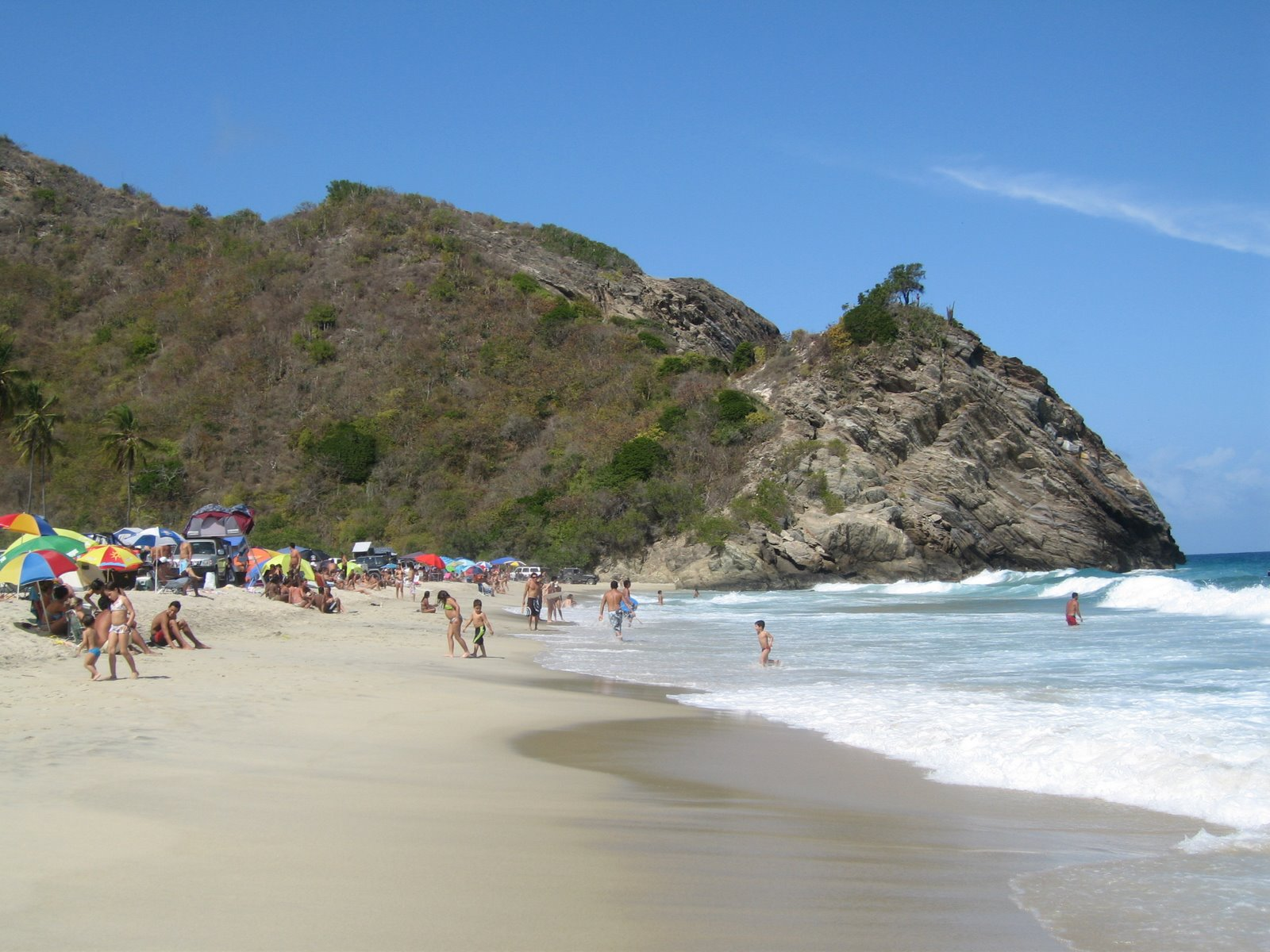
Cuyagua

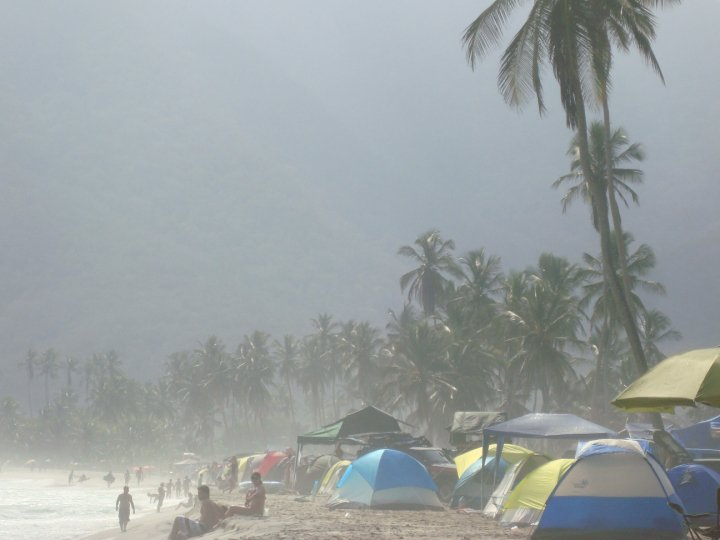
Tents in Cuyagua

== See also ==
- Tourism in Venezuela
- Geography of Venezuela
