= Choroni Beach =

Place in Aragua, Venezuela

Coordinates: 10°30′25″N 67°36′23″W

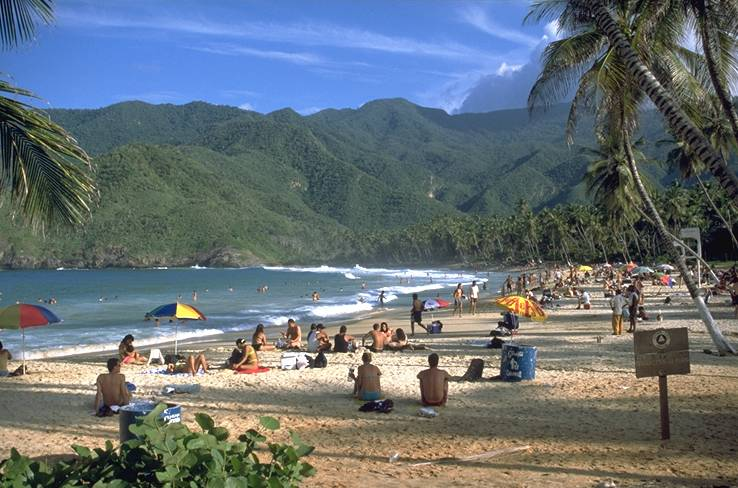
Choroni beach

Choroní is a popular place located in Aragua, Venezuela. Its proper name is Choroní, but because of its proximity to the colonial not official village of Choroní (es), it is often referred to as Playa Grande or El Malecon.

It lies about 50 kilometres (32 miles) from Maracay. The drive from the city of Maracay takes about two hours, on a road built by the Venezuelan dictator Juan Vicente Gómez in 1920, a narrow windy dirt (Adventure) road over the cloud forest mountains of the Henri Pittier National Park before descending to the sea. From 1970 work began to pave the road and was completed by 1990.
