= Aragua =

State in north-central Venezuela

Aragua Estado Aragua (Spanish)
- State
- Aragua State
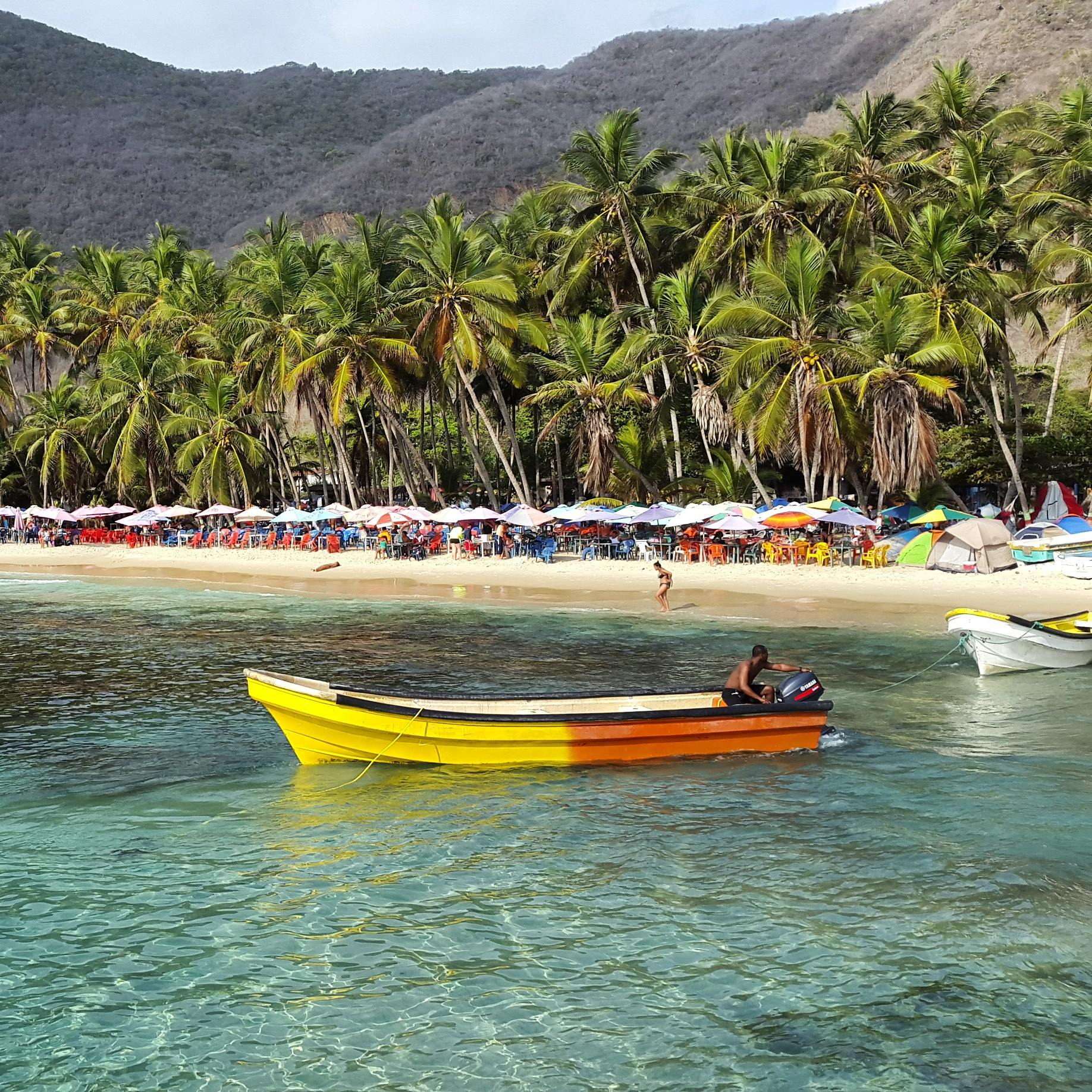
- Bahía de Cata

- Flag Coat of arms
- Motto(s): Dios, Patria y Aragua ("God, Homeland and Aragua")
- Anthem: "Himno del Estado Aragua"
- Location within Venezuela
- Country: Venezuela
- Region: Central
- Municipalities: 18
- Created: 1899
- Capital: Maracay

Government
  - Body: Legislative Council
  - Governor: Joana Sánchez (PSUV)

Area
  - Total: 7,014 km^{2} (2,708 sq mi)
  - Rank: 20th
- 0.76% of Venezuela

Population (2011 census)
  - Total: 1,630,308
  - Rank: 6th
  - Density: 232.4/km^{2} (602.0/sq mi)
- Demonym: Aragüeño
- Time zone: UTC−4 (VET)
- ISO 3166 code: VE-D
- Emblematic tree: Samán (Samanea saman)
- HDI (2019): 0.738 · high · 3rd
- Website: www.aragua.gob.ve

Aragua (Spanish pronunciation: [aˈɾaɣwa]), officially the Aragua State (Spanish: Estado Aragua), is one of the 23 states of Venezuela. It lies in the north-central Central administrative region and is bordered by the Caribbean Sea to the north, Miranda and La Guaira to the east, (Note: Encyclopædia Britannica describes the eastern boundary using the former name Distrito Federal, which was reorganised in 1998 into the Capital District and La Guaira state.) Guárico to the south, and Carabobo to the west. Its capital is Maracay. Aragua has existed as a state in roughly its present form since 1899, and Maracay has been the capital since 1917.

Aragua consists largely of two Andean ranges separated by a basin that holds Lake Valencia, into which the Aragua River drains. The northern part of the state, from the Caribbean coast across the northern range, is occupied by Henri Pittier National Park, the oldest national park in Venezuela. The Aragua River valley is intensively farmed, with sugarcane the leading crop, and Maracay is the state's industrial centre.

Covering 7,014 km^{2} (2,708 sq mi), Aragua is one of the smallest Venezuelan states by area. Its population is concentrated along the coast and in the valleys around Maracay, whose industrial growth made the surrounding area one of the country's more densely settled regions. The 2011 census recorded 1,630,308 inhabitants, the sixth-largest population among the states. The state contains Colonia Tovar, a town founded by German immigrants, and its coastal towns are known for the Dancing Devils performed at Corpus Christi.

== Etymology ==
The state's name derives from an Indigenous word of Cumanagoto (Cariban) origin for the chaguaramo, a palm native to the region. According to Carlos Blanco Galeno, a chronicler of Turmero, the name instead comes from the Cariban aregua, formed from are ("place") and gua (from ogun, "my thing"), giving the sense "my place, my country". The same word gave its name to the Aragua River, a tributary of Lake Valencia.

== History ==
=== Colonial era ===
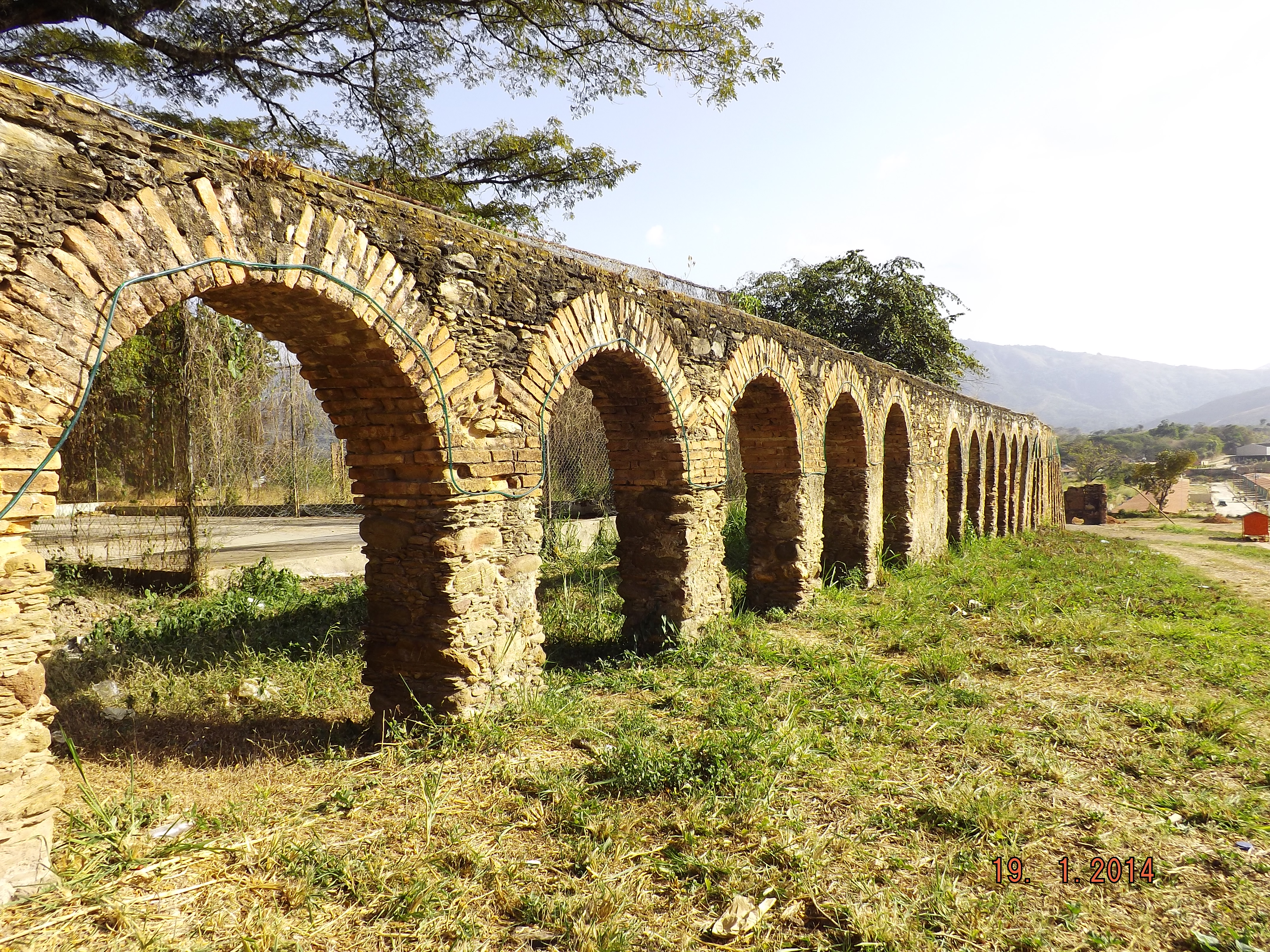
The 17th-century aqueduct of the Hacienda Tiquire Flores at El Consejo

Aragua formed part of the Province of Caracas from 1555. Europeans reached its valleys later than the neighbouring areas of present-day Carabobo and Miranda. Spanish [[encomienda|encomiendas]] were established in the Valleys of Aragua in the late 16th century, and by 1620 the land was divided among about 40 encomenderos, most of whom lived in the Caracas valley.

The land where Maracay now stands was granted to Sebastián Díaz Alfaro in the 16th century and used for cattle grazing; sugarcane and cocoa were planted in the surrounding areas. Around 1700 some 40 families living in the valley petitioned Bishop Diego de Baños y Sotomayor to establish a parish. The settlement was raised to a parish on 5 March 1701, the date recorded as the founding of Maracay, which took its name from the Maracay River. By 1780, La Victoria had about 800 Spanish-speaking Indigenous inhabitants and more than 4,000 people of other groups, including Spaniards, criollos, mestizos, Black people, and zambos. Alexander von Humboldt recorded that around 1800 the population of the Aragua valleys, then including both sides of Lake Valencia, was mainly pardos, criollos, zambos, and enslaved people, with roughly 5,000 registered Indigenous people, most in Turmero and Guacara and none still speaking their ancestral languages.

=== 19th century ===
Aragua was created as a province on 11 February 1848, when it was separated from Caracas. Its territory was close to that of the modern state and comprised La Victoria, Turmero, Maracay, Villa de Cura, and San Sebastián, with La Victoria as its capital. It became an independent state in 1864, then merged with Guárico in 1866 to form the state of Guzmán Blanco; the capital was moved to Villa de Cura in 1881, and Aragua regained its status as an independent state in 1899.

=== 20th century ===
The capital was moved from La Victoria to Maracay in 1917 by order of President Juan Vicente Gómez, who had settled in the city and lived there until his death in 1935. Gómez's residence drove the city's urban and economic growth. The state's present borders were fixed by protocols signed with neighbouring states: Miranda in 1909, Carabobo in 1917, and Guárico in 1933. In 1989 Aragua elected its first governor by direct, universal, and secret vote, ending the practice of appointment by the central government in Caracas.

== Geography ==
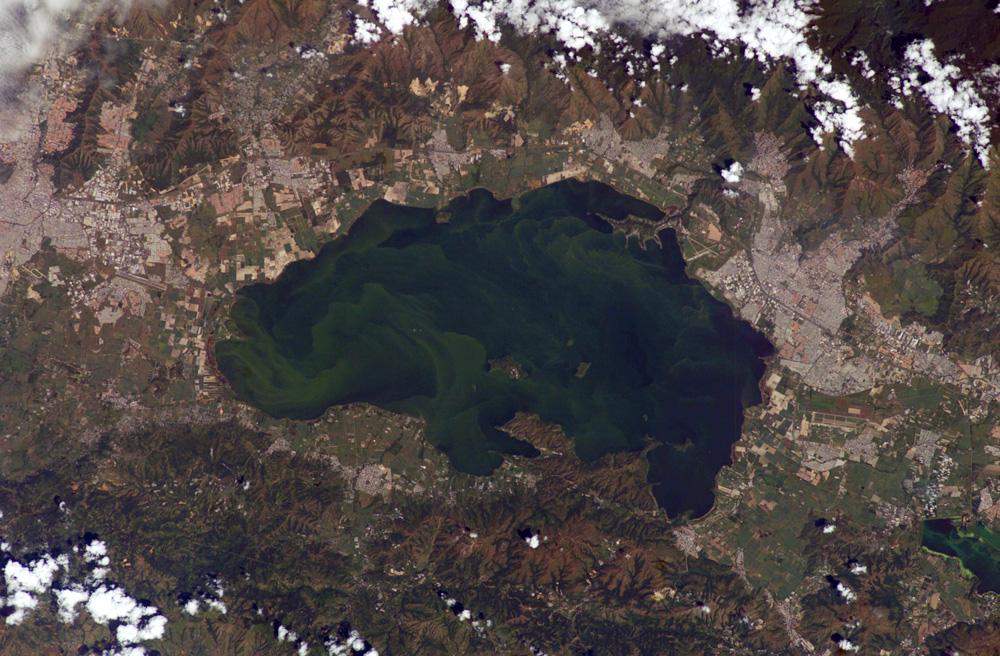
Satellite view of Lake Valencia, the basin at the centre of the state

Aragua's northern border is the Caribbean Sea, its coastline backed by the steep Coastal Range. Much of the state consists of fertile valleys used for intensive agriculture, except in the south, where the plains of the central Llanos begin. Lake Valencia lies on the state's western border. The main rivers are the Aragua, Guárico, El Limón, Tuy, Pao, and Turmero, which drain to the Caribbean, to Lake Valencia, or into the Orinoco basin. The Camatagua Reservoir is a primary water source for Caracas.

=== Relief and geology ===
Two parallel mountain ranges cross the state from east to west, separated by a central depression that creates three physiographic regions running north to south. The northern strip is the central section of the Coastal Range, culminating in El Cenizo peak at 2,436 m (7,992 ft) and Codazzi Peak at 2,426 m (7,959 ft). Four natural regions are distinguished: the Coastal Range, the Lake Valencia depression, the Interior Range, and the central undulating plains. Recent sedimentary formations predominate in the Lake Valencia depression, while the mountains consist largely of metamorphic rock with cores of better-preserved igneous and sedimentary rock.

=== Hydrography ===
The state's drainage divides among three basins: the Caribbean slope, the endorheic Lake Valencia basin, and the Orinoco basin. Rivers of the Caribbean slope include the San Miguel, Ocumare, Cata, Gaurapito, and Aroa. The Aragua, Turmero, Maracay, Caño Grande, Tapatapa, and Tocorón rivers flow into Lake Valencia; their surface flow has been greatly reduced, and they now carry mainly urban, industrial, and agricultural wastewater. The Tuy basin, together with the Guárico River in the Orinoco system, supplies the aqueduct serving Caracas, the Tuy valleys, and the Caucagua region.

Lake Valencia, also called Lake Tacarigua, is the third-largest body of water in Venezuela after Lake Maracaibo and the Guri reservoir. The basin became endorheic after its water level fell below the outlet to the Pao River, and human water use accelerated its decline after 1945. To offset the loss, water was brought from the Pao-Cachinche reservoir in Carabobo in 1975, and the National Institute of Sanitary Works diverted the Cabriales River into the lake in 1978, raising its level.

=== Climate ===
Because of its range of relief and altitude, the state has several thermal zones in which temperature falls as elevation rises. A semi-arid, warm climate dominates the coastal strip, as at Turiamo and Puerto Maya. Orographic rainfall on the northern flank of the Coastal Range supports the cloud forests of Henri Pittier National Park, while sheltered coves such as Chuao, Choroní, and Ocumare are warm and humid enough for cocoa cultivation. At Colonia Tovar, 1,780 m (5,840 ft) above sea level, the mean annual temperature is 15.4 °C (59.7 °F) with about 1,000 mm (39 in) of rain. In Maracay, at 445 m (1,460 ft), the mean is 25 °C (77 °F) with 834 mm (32.8 in) of rain and a marked dry season. The southern plains have a tropical savanna climate, with about 1,100 mm (43 in) of rain and a mean of 26 °C (79 °F).

=== Soils and vegetation ===
The soils of the Aragua valleys are fertile and mineral-rich, and are among the most productive in Venezuela; the lake margins contain calcium from fossil deposits. Vegetation ranges from the dense cloud forest of Henri Pittier National Park on the Coastal Range to thorny scrub near the coast. Grasses dominate the valleys and savannas, together with trees such as kapok, cedar, and samán.

== Demographics ==
Population of Aragua
Year	Pop.	±%
1873	110,828	—
1881	108,085	−2.5%
1891	94,195	−12.9%
1920	97,251	+3.2%
1926	105,849	+8.8%
1936	129,746	+22.6%
1941	138,235	+6.5%
1950	189,891	+37.4%
1961	313,274	+65.0%
1971	543,170	+73.4%
1981	891,623	+64.2%
1990	1,120,132	+25.6%
2001	1,449,616	+29.4%
2011	1,630,308	+12.5%
Source: Instituto Nacional de Estadística

The 2011 census recorded 1,630,308 inhabitants, the sixth-largest population among Venezuelan states. The population is concentrated along the coast and in the lower valleys, with the Aragua valleys among the most densely settled parts of the country following the industrialisation of Maracay.

According to the 2011 census, the racial composition of the population was:

Group	%
Mestizo	51.9
White	43.4
Black	3.6
Other	1.1

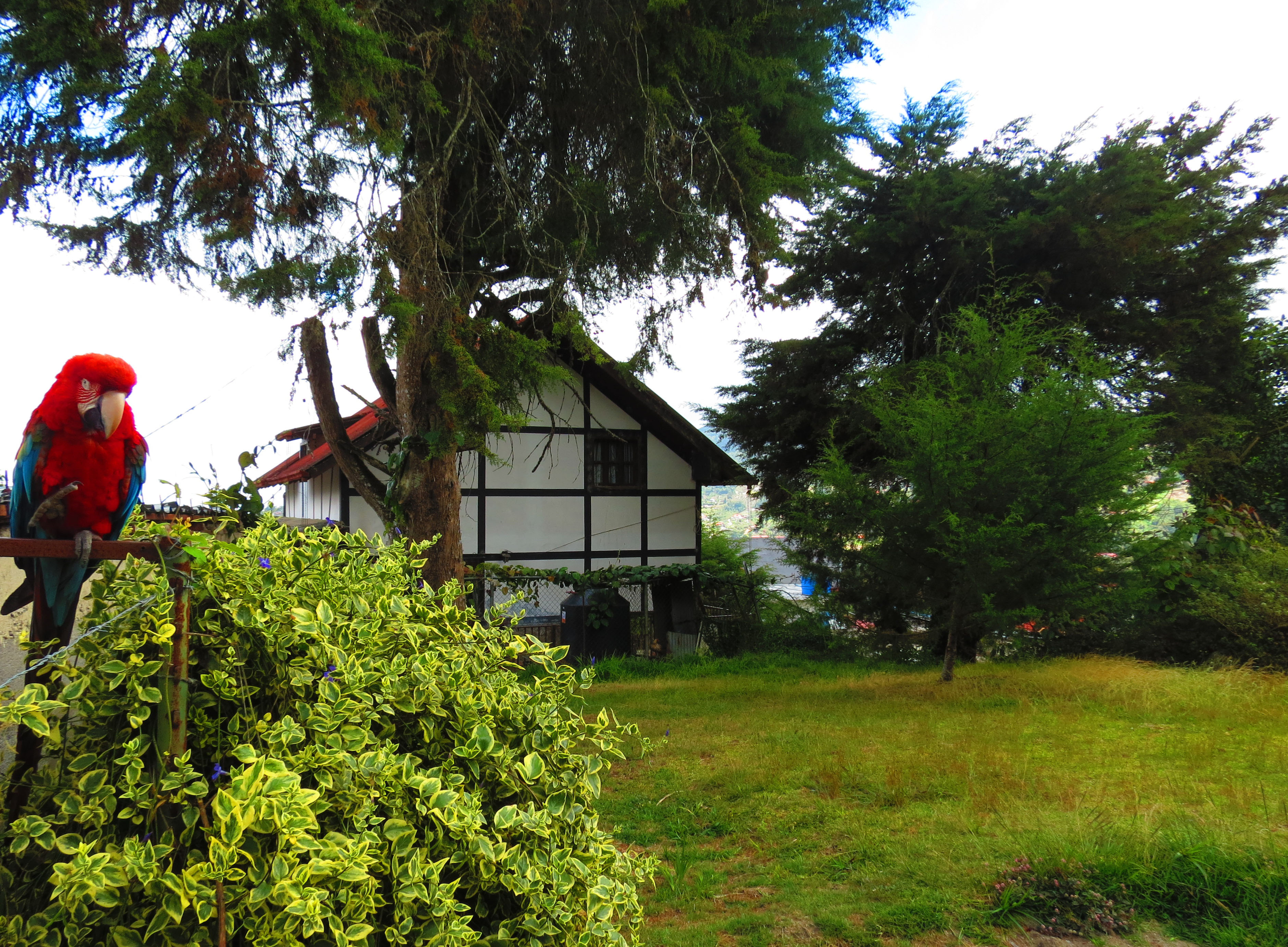
Colonia Tovar, a town founded by German immigrants in the 19th century

Immigration from the 1950s onward left a diverse population of mainly mixed descent, with Spanish, Indigenous, and African ancestry. White inhabitants form a majority in the northern municipalities of Tovar, Mario Briceño Iragorry, and Girardot. Tovar is populated almost entirely by descendants of the German immigrants who founded Colonia Tovar in the 19th century.

== Economy ==
The Aragua River valley is intensively farmed. Sugarcane has long been the leading crop and potatoes are the next most valuable, alongside cacao, coffee, cotton, maize, tomatoes, citrus fruits, rice, and tobacco. Cattle raising remains important, though herds have shrunk as pasture is converted to farmland. Industrial development has been marked, especially in and around Maracay.

== Politics and government ==
As a federal state, Aragua is autonomous and politically equal to the other members of the federation. It organises its public powers under the Constitution of Aragua State, adopted in 2002, which divides them into executive and legislative branches; amendments require an absolute majority of the state's deputies.

=== Executive ===
Executive authority rests with the governor, who appoints a cabinet of state secretaries. The governor is elected by direct vote for a four-year term and may be re-elected. Direct election of governors began in 1989, replacing appointment by the central government. The current governor is Joana Sánchez of the PSUV, elected in 2025.

Elected governors of Aragua since 1989
Term	Governor	Party	Vote (%)
1989–1992	Carlos Tablante	MAS	50.51
1992–1995	Carlos Tablante	MAS	62.73
1995–1998	Didalco Bolívar	MAS	48.93
1998–2000	Didalco Bolívar	MAS	72.44
2000–2004	Didalco Bolívar	MAS	84.54
2004–2008	Didalco Bolívar	PODEMOS	67.70
2008–2012	Rafael Isea	PSUV	58.92
2012–2016	Tareck El Aissami	PSUV	55.56
2017	Caryl Bertho	PSUV	Replacement (Note: Caryl Bertho (2017) and Daniela González (2021) held office briefly as replacement governors rather than by election, after Tareck El Aissami and Rodolfo Marco Torres respectively left the post.)
2017–2021	Rodolfo Marco Torres	PSUV	57.02
2021	Daniela González	PSUV	Replacement
2021–2025	Karina Carpio Bejarano	PSUV	51.60
2025–present	Joana Sánchez	PSUV	86.92

=== Legislative ===
The unicameral Legislative Council of Aragua exercises the state's legislative functions. Its members are elected by direct and secret vote every four years and may be re-elected. The council is elected by proportional representation of the state and its municipalities; the governor reports to it, and it approves the regional budget.

== Municipalities ==
Municipalities of Aragua

Aragua is divided into 18 municipalities (municipios) and 50 civil parishes.

Municipalities and their seats
Municipality	Seat
Bolívar	San Mateo
Camatagua	Camatagua
Francisco Linares Alcántara	Santa Rita
Girardot	Maracay
José Ángel Lamas	Santa Cruz
José Félix Ribas	La Victoria
José Rafael Revenga	El Consejo
Libertador	Palo Negro
Mario Briceño Iragorry	El Limón
Ocumare de la Costa de Oro	Ocumare de la Costa
San Casimiro	San Casimiro
San Sebastián	San Sebastián
Santiago Mariño	Turmero
Santos Michelena	Las Tejerías
Sucre	Cagua
Tovar	Colonia Tovar
Urdaneta	Barbacoas
Zamora	Villa de Cura

== Transport ==
Aragua has a network of trunk and local roads. The main routes are the Central Regional Highway (Trunk 1), which links the state with Carabobo, Miranda, and the Capital District; Trunk 2, which crosses the state from north to south toward Guárico; and local roads 6 and 7, which reach the coast.

== Culture ==
The best known of Aragua's traditions are the Diablos Danzantes (Dancing Devils), masked dancers who perform on the feast of Corpus Christi in coastal towns including Chuao, Cuyagua, Cata, Ocumare, and Turiamo. The practice, shared with several other Venezuelan states, was inscribed on UNESCO's Representative List of the Intangible Cultural Heritage of Humanity in 2012.

Maracay's cultural institutions include the Aeronautics Museum of Maracay, a museum of anthropology and history holding archaeological finds from Aragua and Carabobo, and two theatres, the Ateneo de Maracay and the Maracay Opera House.

== Tourism ==
Aragua is known within Venezuela for its beaches, natural monuments, and green areas, and for Colonia Tovar, a town settled by German immigrants.

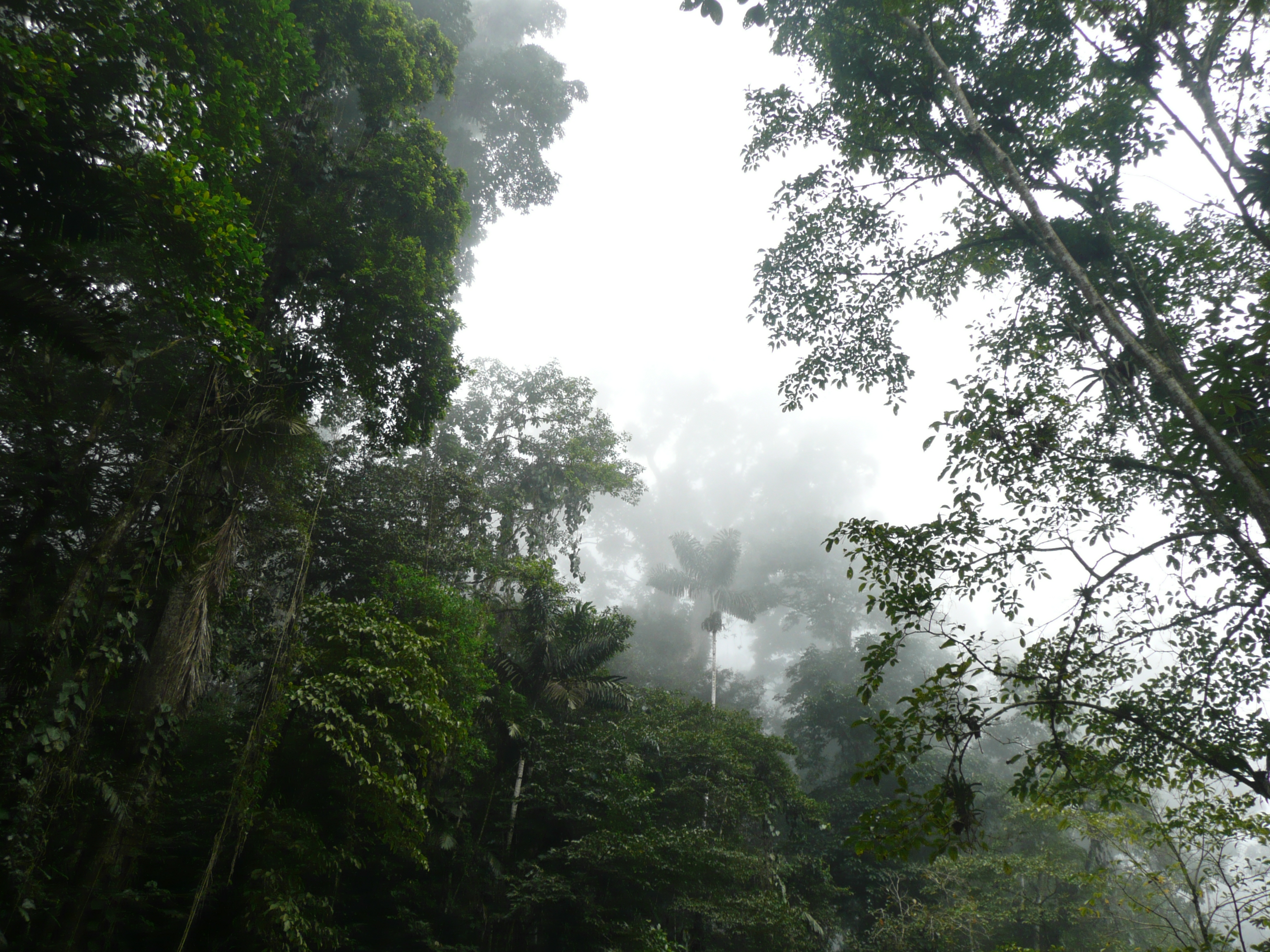
Cloud forest in Henri Pittier National Park

Henri Pittier National Park, created in 1937 as Rancho Grande, is the oldest national park in Venezuela; it was renamed in 1953 for the Swiss geographer, botanist, and ethnologist Henri Pittier, who reached Venezuela in 1917 and classified more than 30,000 of the country's plants. The park has a rugged relief of metamorphic and igneous rock, with rocky coastal environments and altitudes ranging from sea level to the peaks of the Coastal Range. The Pico Codazzi Natural Monument, one of the highest points of the Coastal Range, carries a humid forest on its slopes and is named for the Italian naturalist and cartographer Agostino Codazzi, who promoted the German settlement that became Colonia Tovar.

== Sports ==
The Tigres de Aragua of the Venezuelan Professional Baseball League play in Maracay at the Estadio José Pérez Colmenares. Other teams based in the state include the football club Aragua F.C. and the basketball club Toros de Aragua.

== See also ==
- Tren de Aragua, an international crime organisation reported to have originated in Tocorón prison in the state
