= Allobates undulatus =

Conservation status
- Vulnerable (IUCN 3.1)

Scientific classification
- Kingdom: Animalia
- Phylum: Chordata
- Class: Amphibia
- Order: Anura
- Family: Aromobatidae
- Genus: Allobates
- Species: A. undulatus

Binomial name
- Allobates undulatus (Myers and Donnelly, 2001)

Synonyms
- Colostethus undulatus Myers and Donnelly, 2001

Species of frog

Allobates undulatus is a species of frog in the family Aromobatidae. It is endemic to Venezuela where it is only known from its type locality, Cerro Yutajé, in the Amazonas state. The specific name undulatus refers to the characteristic wavy-edged dorsal marking of this species.

== Description ==
Adult males measure 20–22 mm (0.8–0.9 in) and adult females 20–25 mm (0.8–1.0 in) in snout–vent length. The head is little wider than the body. The snout is sloping, rounded in profile and broadly rounded in dorsal and ventral views. The tympanum is rather inconspicuous and is concealed dorsally and posteriorly by a diffuse supratympanic bulge. The fingers have moderately expanded discs. The toes have weakly to moderately expanded discs some basal webbing between the toes (only distinct between toes II–III). The dorsum is orangish brown, with a usually prominent, wavy-edged, darker brown or grayish brown figure. The face mask is black, continuing and widening behind the eye to become a broad lateral stripe. The arms are pale orange. The upper sides of thighs and shanks are brown (or shanks are brown and thighs are orange), with darker brown crossbands; the posterior thigh surface is either brown with an orange suffusion or overall bright orange.

== Habitat and conservation ==
Allobates undulatus is diurnal, terrestrial frog found in mossy gallery forest. Scientists know it exclusively from its type locality in Cerro Yutajé, at an elevation of about 1,750 m (5,740 ft) above sea level. Its range is within the Formaciones de Tepuyes Natural Monument protected area.

== Reproduction ==
Scientists believe the tadpoles develop in streams, like those of other frogs in Allobates.

== Threats ==
The IUCN classifies this frog as vulnerable to extinction. Its principal threats are habitat fragmentation, climate change, and disease. Because of the frog's small known range, any drastic changes in temperature or precipitation could wipe it out, either by killing adults directly or by interfering with reproductive conditions. Because the frogs all live in one place, a pathogen could affect the entire population. Habitat fragmentation is also a noted threat.
