= Santa Rita, Venezuela =

Santa Rita
- Valle de Santa Rita de Cascia
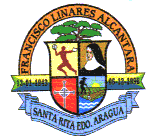
- Flag Coat of arms

- Location within Venezuela
- Coordinates: 10°12′01″N 67°33′05″W
- Country: Venezuela
- State: Aragua
- Municipality: Francisco Linares Alcántara Municipality
- City Established: December 16, 1997
- Elevation: 435 m (1,427 ft)

Population (2001)
  - Total: 134,233
  - Demonym: Santaricense/a
- Time zone: UTC−4 (VST)
- Postal code: 2103
- Area code: 0243
- Climate: Aw

Santa Rita is a city in the state of Aragua, Venezuela. It is the shire town of the Francisco Linares Alcántara Municipality, in the state of Aragua. It is part of the metropolitan area of Maracay. It is 435 meters above sea level and is located in the hydrographic basin of Lake Valencia. Santa Rita is bordered to the north by the Caño Colorado, and the Caracas-Valencia Highway, and to the south by the Turmero River. In 2023, Santa Rita had 149,158 inhabitants.

== Geography ==
=== Terrain ===
The city of Santa Rita is located within the physiographic unit "Valencia Lake Depression" and specifically in its central plain. Its relief is flat with a slight slope to the southwest. The elevation is about 428 m above sea level.

=== Climate ===
The present climate is dry pre-mountainous in transition to dry tropical. The average annual temperature is about 25 °C and with an average annual precipitation of 902 m.m./year.

== See also ==
- List of cities and towns in Venezuela
