= Abra de Río Frío Natural Monument =

Abra de Río Frío Natural Monument Monumento Natural Abra de Río Frío
- IUCN category III (natural monument or feature)
- Location within Venezuela
- Location: Venezuela
- Coordinates: 7°46′N 72°13′W
- Area: 12.82 km^{2} (4.95 sq mi)
- Established: February 18, 1993

The Abra de Río Frío Natural Monument (Spanish: Monumento Natural Abra de Río Frío) Is a protected natural space located in the municipality of San Cristóbal, in the state of Táchira, Venezuela. Received the status of natural monument on February 18, 1993.

The natural space aims to protect the geological and orographic structure of the open cold river, the only natural step through the Andean Cordilleras, linking the high western plains and tectonic Táchira depression.

The area is of a very populated vegetation, whose flora plays a regulating role of the microclimatic conditions in its surroundings. Close to its borders, which extend to the banks of the river Uribante, join the rivers Frío and Quinimari.

The natural area also protects the transitability of the road that connects San Cristóbal with the regions of the Uribante.

== See also ==
- List of national parks of Venezuela
- Meseta la Galera Natural Monument
- Teta de Niquitao-Guirigay Natural Monument
