= Keiver Fernández =

Venezuelan boxer (born 1996)

Personal information
- Nicknames: El Chamo; El Chuky
- Born: Keiver Josué Fernández Moronta; 18 September 1996 (age 29) Maracay, Venezuela
- Weight: Flyweight; Super flyweight

Boxing career

Boxing record
- Total fights: 27
- Wins: 25
- Win by KO: 12
- Losses: 1
- Draws: 1

Keiver Josué Fernández Moronta (born 18 September 1996) is a Venezuelan professional boxer who has held the WBA Fedelatin super flyweight title since June 2021.

== Early years ==
Fernández was born on 18 September 1996 in Maracay, but grew up in Santa Cruz de Aragua. He began boxing at the Estadio José Inés Martínez at the age of 13 to avoid falling into a street life of crime.

== Professional career ==
Fernández made his professional debut on 14 December 2013, defeating Dionis Martínez by first-round knockout at the Parque Naciones Unidas in Caracas. He won his first nine bouts before managing a majority draw against Nohel Arambulet on 23 April 2016. In his next fight five months later he competed outside of Venezuela for the first time, beating Israel Hidrogo by unanimous decision in Panama City. It was the beginning of an 11-fight win streak between 2016 and 2019. After accumulating a 20–0–1 record, Fernández earned a fight against fellow undefeated prospect Orlando Peñalba for the vacant WBO Latino super flyweight title. On 8 February 2020, he suffered the first defeat of his career after the judges awarded Peñalba a split decision victory in Panama City.

On 19 June 2021, Fernández defeated Keyvin Lara via split decision to win the vacant WBA Fedelatin super flyweight title, with the judges' scorecards reading 86–85, 86–85 and 85–86. Fernández made his first WBA Fedelatin title defense against Pablo Macario on 19 March 2022. He retained the title by unanimous decision, with two scorecards of 97–93 and one scorecard of 98–92.

== Professional boxing record ==
27 fights	25 wins	1 loss
By knockout	13	0
By decision	12	1
Draws	1	

No.	Result	Record	Opponent	Type	Round, time	Date	Location	Notes
27	Win	25–1–1	Pablo Macario	UD	10	19 Mar 2022	Los Andes Mall, Panama City, Panama	Retained WBA Fedelatin super flyweight title
26	Win	24–1–1	Jose Antonio Jimenez	KO	2 (8), 0:34	20 Oct 2021	Los Andes Mall, Panama City, Panama	
25	Win	23–1–1	Keyvin Lara	SD	9	19 Jun 2021	Restaurante Bar La 12, Panama City, Panama	Won vacant WBA Fedelatin super flyweight title
24	Win	22–1–1	Engel Gómez	UD	8	16 Apr 2021	Restaurante Bar La 12, Panama City, Panama	
23	Win	21–1–1	Luis Guatache	UD	8	10 Dec 2020	Coliseo Renacimiento, Corozal, Colombia	
22	Loss	20–1–1	Orlando Peñalba	SD	10	8 Feb 2020	Hotel El Panama, Panama City, Panama	For vacant WBO Latino super flyweight title
21	Win	20–0–1	Samuel Araque	KO	1 (6), 0:49	15 Feb 2019	Centro Olímpico, San Juan de los Morros, Venezuela	
20	Win	19–0–1	Romeli Martínez	TKO	2 (8), 0:30	14 Dec 2018	Centro Recreacional Yesterday, Turmero, Venezuela	
19	Win	18–0–1	Osmel Colina	TKO	2 (6), 1:05	22 Sep 2018	Centro Recreacional Yesterday, Turmero, Venezuela	
18	Win	17–0–1	Carlos Durán	TKO	1 (8), 2:46	1 Sep 2018	Plaza El Urbanismo, Caracas, Venezuela	
17	Win	16–0–1	Víctor Flores	TKO	1 (6), 1:30	11 Aug 2018	Gimnasio Luis Beltán Díaz, Maracay, Venezuela	
16	Win	15–0–1	Alexander Guarecuco	UD	6	23 Jun 2019	Gimnasio Mocho Navas, Petare, Venezuela	
15	Win	14–0–1	Fernando Zambrano	TKO	2 (6), 1:35	16 Jun 2018	Gimnasio Luis Beltán Díaz, Maracay, Venezuela	
14	Win	13–0–1	Luis Reverón	KO	1 (6), 1:20	26 May 2018	Maracay, Venezuela	
13	Win	12–0–1	Juan López	UD	8	30 Jun 2017	Los Andes Mall, Panama City, Panama	
12	Win	11–0–1	Jorge González	UD	6	11 Feb 2017	Centro Recreacional Yesterday, Turmero, Venezuela	
11	Win	10–0–1	Israel Hidrogo	UD	8	21 Oct 2016	Los Andes Mall, Panama City, Panama	
10	Draw	9–0–1	Nohel Arambulet	MD	10	23 Apr 2016	Centro Recreacional Yesterday, Turmero, Venezuela	
9	Win	9–0	Nelson Magallanes	RTD	3 (6), 3:00	14 Nov 2015	Polideportivo Barrio Carmelo Urdaneta, Maracaibo, Venezuela	
8	Win	8–0	David Rengel	UD	4	3 Oct 2015	Centro Recreacional Yesterday, Turmero, Venezuela	
7	Win	7–0	Vicente Mirabal	UD	6	15 Aug 2015	Centro Comercial Hyper Jumbo, Maracay, Venezuela	
6	Win	6–0	Efren Luces	KO	5 (6), 0:32	30 May 2015	Centro Recreacional Yesterday, Turmero, Venezuela	
5	Win	5–0	Vicente Mirabal	UD	6	18 Dec 2015	Centro Recreacional Yesterday, Turmero, Venezuela	
4	Win	4–0	Efren Luces	UD	4	19 Dec 2014	Maracay, Venezuela	
3	Win	3–0	Nelson Magallanes	KO	3 (4), 1:40	14 Nov 2014	Centro Recreacional Yesterday, Turmero, Venezuela	
2	Win	2–0	Edicson Fuenmayor	TKO	1 (4), 2:25	18 Oct 2014	Palo Negro, Maracay, Venezuela	
1	Win	1–0	Dionis Martínez	KO	1 (4), 1:55	14 Dec 2013	Parque Naciones Unidas, Caracas, Venezuela	
