= Glossary of vexillology =

Flag terminology is the nomenclature, or system of terms, used in vexillology, the study of flags, to describe precisely the parts, patterns, and other attributes of flags and their display.

== Flag types ==
Banderole or bannerol

A small flag or streamer carried on the lance of a knight, or a long, narrow flag flown from the masthead of a ship.
Banner

Generically, a synonym for a flag of any kind, and in heraldry specifically, a square or rectangular flag whose design is identical to the shield of a coat of arms; also denominated a banner of arms.
Burgee

A distinguishing flag of a recreational boating organisation, which commonly has the shape of a pennant.
Civil ensign, merchant flag, or merchant ensign

A version of a national flag that is flown on civil ships to denote their nationality.
Civil flag

A version of a national flag that is flown on civil installations or craft.
Colour or color

The flag of a military unit.
Corner flag

A small flag flown at each of the corners of a football pitch or other sports field.
Courtesy flag or courtesy ensign

A flag that is flown on a visiting ship in foreign waters as a sign of respect for the foreign nation.
Ensign

The flag of any ship or military unit, or, generically, a synonym for any kind of flag. On ships, an ensign is normally flown at the stern.
Fanion

A small flag that the French military uses.
Gonfalon, gonfanon, or gonfalone

A heraldic flag that is suspended and pendent from a crossbar.
Guidon

A small flag that a military unit flies; in Scottish heraldry, a smaller version of the standard (see below).
Jack

A flag flown from a short jackstaff at the bow of a ship.
National flag

A flag that represents and symbolizes a given nation. It is flown by the government of that nation, but can also be flown by its citizens.
Pennon or pennant

A flag that is wider at the hoist than at the fly.
Pipe banner

A decorative flag for Scottish Highland bagpipes.
Prayer flag

A kind of flag that is flown along mountain ridges and peaks in the Himalayas in order to bless the surrounding land.
Rank flag or distinguishing flag

A flag that a superior naval officer flies on his flagship or headquarters.
Signal flag

A flag or pennant that communicates or signals information which is not heraldic.
Standard

In heraldry, a long tapering flag that bears heraldic badges and the motto of the armiger; it may also refer to a military colour that cavalry units fly or a royal standard of a monarch or member of a royal family.
State flag or governmental flag

A version of a national flag that represents and may be restricted in use only to the national government and agencies thereof; the design of many state flags consists of the civil flag (see above) defaced with a coat of arms or other heraldic charge.
Vexilloid

A flag-like object that is used in a similar symbolic manner as a flag, but differs from a conventional flag in some way.
Vexillum

A flag-like object that is suspended from a horizontal crossbar; the Ancient Roman army used it as its military standard.
War flag, military flag, or battle flag

A variant of a national flag that a nation's military forces use on land.
Windsock

A conical textile tube that is used to indicate the direction and strength of wind.

== Flag elements ==
Parts of a flag

Badge
A coat of arms or simple heraldic symbol.
Canton

Any quarter of a flag, but commonly means the upper hoist quarter, such as the field of stars in the flag of the United States or the Union Jack in the Australian Flag.
Charge
A figure or symbol appearing in the field of a flag.
Emblem
A device often used as a charge on a flag. It may be heraldic in origin or modern, for example the maple leaf on the Canadian Flag.
Field
The background of a flag; the color behind the charges.
Fimbriation
A narrow edging or border, generally in white or gold, on a flag to separate two other colors. For example, the white and gold lines of the South African Flag.
Finial
A decorative or protective cap atop the flagpole. Often shaped like a sphere, but can also be a shape with heraldic significance, such as a spear or an eagle. Sometimes referred to as a capper.
Fly
The half or edge of a flag furthest away from the flagpole. This term also sometimes refers to the horizontal length of a flag.
Heading

A piece of loose fabric running along the hoist for attaching a flag to its rope.
Hoist
The half or edge of a flag nearest to the flagpole. This term also sometimes refers to the vertical dimension of a flag.
Length
The span of a flag along the side at right angles to the flagpole.
Width or breadth
The span of a flag down the side parallel to the flagpole.

== Basic patterns ==
Flags often inherit traits seen in traditional European heraldry designs, and as a result, patterns often share names.

Name	Illustration	Example	Citation
Vertical bisection (per pale)		Flag of Algeria	
Horizontal bisection (per fess)		Flag of Indonesia	
Diagonal bisection (per bend)		Flag of Papua New Guinea	
Diagonal bisection (per bend sinister)		Flag of Bhutan	
Pale		Flag of Nigeria	
Vertical tricolor (Tierced in pale)		Flag of France	
Fess		Flag of Austria	
Horizontal tricolor (Tierced in fess)		Flag of the Netherlands	
Bend		Flag of Trinidad and Tobago	
Bend sinister		Flag of the Republic of the Congo	
Side		Flag of Pakistan	
Side sinister		Flag of Vologda Oblast	
Chief		Flag of New Brunswick	
Base		Flag of California	
Quadrisection (per cross)		Flag of Panama	
Diagonal quadrisection (per saltire)		Flag of Aragua	
Greek (Hellenic) cross		Flag of Switzerland	
Symmetric cross		Flag of England	
Nordic cross		Flag of Sweden	
Saltire		Flag of Scotland	
Canton		Flag of Taiwan	
Border		Flag of Montenegro	
Bordure		Flag of Maldives	
Pile		Flag of the Bahamas	
Pile throughout		Flag of Eritrea	
Lozenge		Flag of Brazil	
Lozenge throughout		Flag of Saba	
Chevron		Flag of NAVA	
Pall		Flag of South Africa	
Arrowhead		Flag of Guyana	
Gusset		Flag of Jubaland	
Stripes		Flag of Catalonia	

== Techniques in flag display ==
Distress
Flying the flag upside-down, (Note: For example, 36 US Code §176 provides: "The flag should never be displayed with the union down, except as a signal of dire distress in instances of extreme danger to life or property.") or tying it into a wheft.
Half-mast

A style of flag display where the flag is flown at least the width of the flag between the top of the flag and the top of the pole. Typically used as a display of mourning or rememberence.
Hoist
The act or function of raising a flag, as on a rope.
Lower
The act or function of taking down a flag, as on a rope.

=== Illustrations ===
Flag illustrations generally depict flags flying from the observer's point of view from left to right, the view known as the obverse (or "front"); the other side is the reverse (or "back"). There are some exceptions, notably some Islamic flags inscribed in Arabic, which is written from right to left; for these the obverse is defined as the side with the hoist to the observer's right.

== See also ==
- Vexillology
- Vexillological symbol
- Civil flag
- Ensign (flag)
- Flag families
- Maritime flag
- National flag
- National coat of arms
- National emblem
- National seal
- National symbol
- State flag
- Galleries and lists:
  - Flags of Europe
  - Gallery of sovereign state flags
  - Gallery of flags of dependent territories
  - Lists of flags
  - List of flags by design
  - List of national flags by design
  - List of national flags of sovereign states
  - List of Japanese flags
  - List of United Kingdom flags
  - List of Antarctic flags
  - List of flags by color combination
  - List of sovereign states by date of current flag adoption
  - Gallery pages of flags of country subdivisions
