= Teta de Niquitao-Guirigay Natural Monument =

Teta de Niquitao-Guirigay Natural Monument Monumento Natural Teta de Niquitao-Guirigay
- IUCN category III (natural monument or feature)
- Location within Venezuela
- Location: Venezuela
- Coordinates: 9°06′N 70°30′W
- Area: 335.36 km^{2} (129.48 sq mi)
- Established: September 4, 1996

The Teta de Niquitao-Guirigay Natural Natural Monument (Spanish: Monumento Natural Teta de Niquitao-Guirigay) Is a protected natural space located in the Trujillo state, in the Andes of Venezuela. It has the highest mountain in the state with a height of 4006 meters. It is located in the Niquitao parish of Boconó municipality, this Andean landscape is emblematic for all locals. This natural monument was promulgated according to Decree No. 1,473 on September 4, 1996 and published in Official Gazette No. 36.063 on October 11, 1996. It had its justification in the need to protect and preserve unique landscapes consisting of monoclinic ridges, moors and relics of cloud forest, so that INPARQUES guarantees the conservation and preservation of the natural and cultural resources of the area.

The «Teta de Niquitao» (4,006 masl) is also known by the name of Musi or Picacho peak (local name derived from the term pico). This monument can be reached through the city of Boconó, then heading to the towns of Tostós and Niquitao. And from Tostós, by a road that ascends until approximately 3,400 msnm, it is reached to the «Teta».

== See also ==
- List of national parks of Venezuela
- Abra de Río Frío Natural Monument

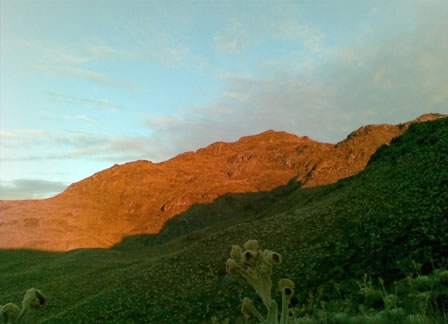
Other View
