= Camatagua =

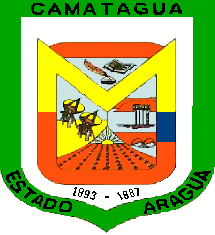
- Coat of arms

- Location within Venezuela
- Coordinates: 09°47′28″N 66°54′29″W
- Country: Venezuela
- State: Aragua
- Municipality: Camatagua Municipality
- Elevation: 245 m (804 ft)

Population
  - Total: 5,444
- Time zone: UTC−4 (VET)
- Postal code: 2335
- Climate: Aw

Camatagua is a town in the state of Aragua, Venezuela. It is the shire town of the Camatagua Municipality. It was founded in 1693 (as Purísima Concepción de Camatagua), as a settlement of indigenous people. It was refounded in 1716 by more than 30 Waikeri families.

== See also ==
- List of cities and towns in Venezuela
