= San Sebastián, Aragua =

San Sebastián
- San Sebastián de los Reyes
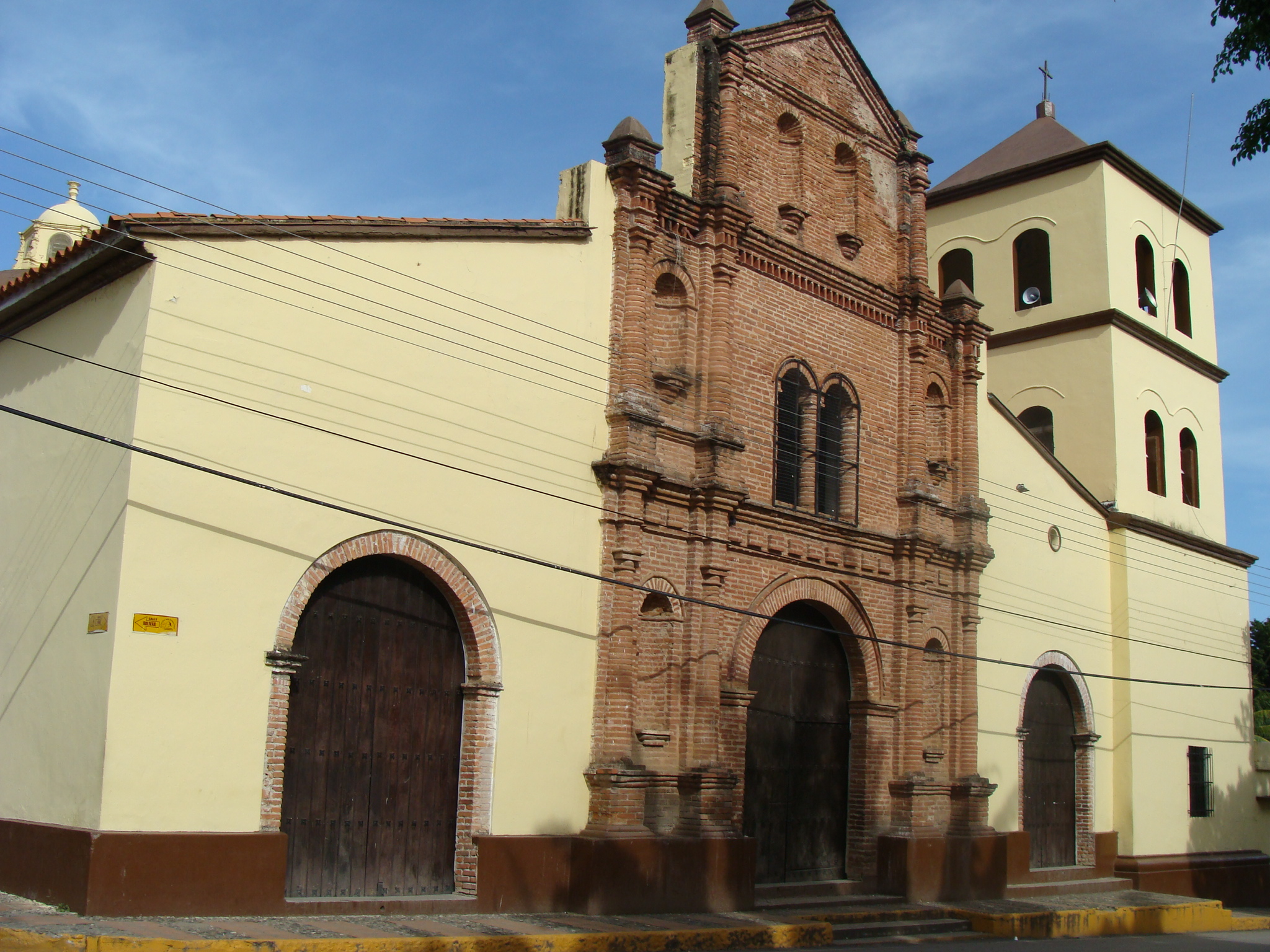
- Church of Nuestra Señora del Carmen

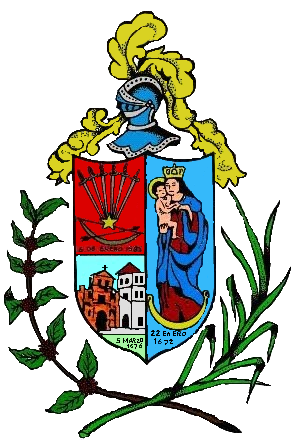
- Coat of arms

- Location within Venezuela
- Coordinates: 9°56′26″N 67°10′09″W
- Country: Venezuela
- State: Aragua
- Municipality: San Sebastián Municipality
- Founded: 1585
- Elevation: 367 m (1,204 ft)
- Time zone: UTC−4 (VET)
- Climate: Aw

San Sebastián is a city in the state of Aragua in Venezuela. It is the shire town of the San Sebastián Municipality. It is twinned with Sanlúcar de Barrameda in Spain.

== See also ==
- List of cities and towns in Venezuela
