= Las Tejerías =

- City
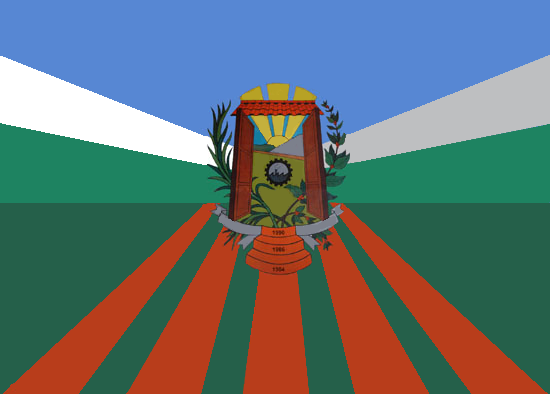
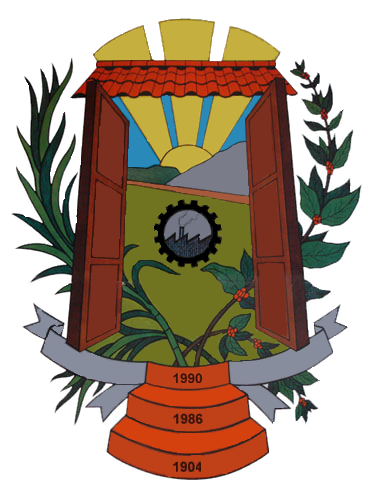
- Flag Coat of arms

- Location in Venezuela
- Coordinates: 10°15′16.5″N 67°10′7.7″W
- Country: Venezuela
- State: Aragua
- Municipality: Santos Michelena
- Founded: 1904

Government
  - Mayor: Regulo La Cruz (PSUV)

Area
  - Total: 19 km^{2} (7.3 sq mi)
- Elevation: 510 m (1,670 ft)

Population (2018)
  - Total: 54,392
- Demonym: Tejerieña
- Time zone: UTC−04:30 (VET)
- Postal Code: 2119 1

Las Tejerías is a city in Aragua, Venezuela. It is the capital of the Santos Michelena municipality, and it had a population of 54,392 people in 2018. The name of the city is thought to have originated from pottery, as well as the manufacture of tiles, bricks and adobes.

== Location ==
The city is located at 510 meters above sea level in the transitional zone between the coastal mountain range and the Aragua valleys. Its origins date back to the end of the 19th century, linked to the construction of the Caracas-Valencia railway. The Pan-American Highway and the Central Regional Highway run near to the city.

== Local economy ==
Much of the economy is based on industrial activities, where agroindustries and manufacturing stand out. There is agricultural development of pig breeding and sugar cane cultivation, but industrial and urban landscapes have replaced the fertile traditional agricultural spaces. Las Tejerías has two industrial zones of vital importance for the state of Aragua, with multiple important companies such as Mack de Venezuela, Galletera Puig, Concrecasa, La Montserratina and the Chery vehicle assembler. The first generation Range Rover was produced in the city.

== History ==
On September 28, 1993, an accident occurred on the Central Regional Highway, as a result of the accidental rupture of a gas pipeline adjacent to the road. The event has been remembered in Venezuelan public opinion since then as the Tragedy of Las Tejerías, which left 53 people dead and 70 injured. In 2003, the Provegran Accident occurred in the city, leaving 9 dead.

=== 2022 landslide ===
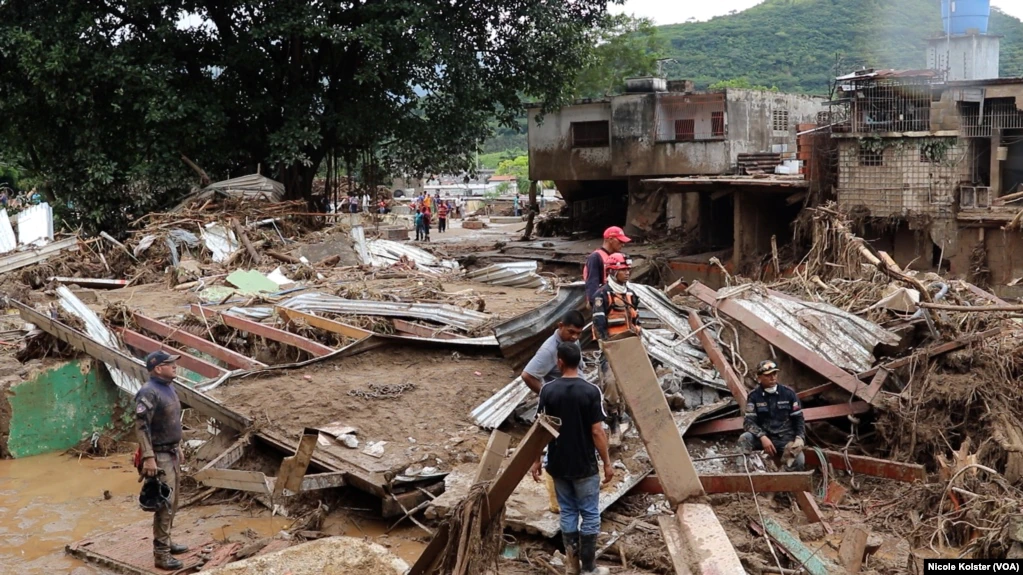
Damage caused in the aftermath of the landslide on October 8, 2022.

On the night of October 8, 2022, the Los Patos stream overflowed due to heavy rainfall caused by Hurricane Julia, causing a landslide. The next day, 43 dead and more than 50 missing were officially confirmed. The president of Venezuela Nicolás Maduro decreed three days of mourning as a result of the tragedy. Delcy Rodríguez, the executive vice president of Venezuela, visited the site to evaluate and organize teams to care for those affected.
