= San Casimiro Municipality =

San Casimiro Municipality Municipio San Casimiro
- Municipality
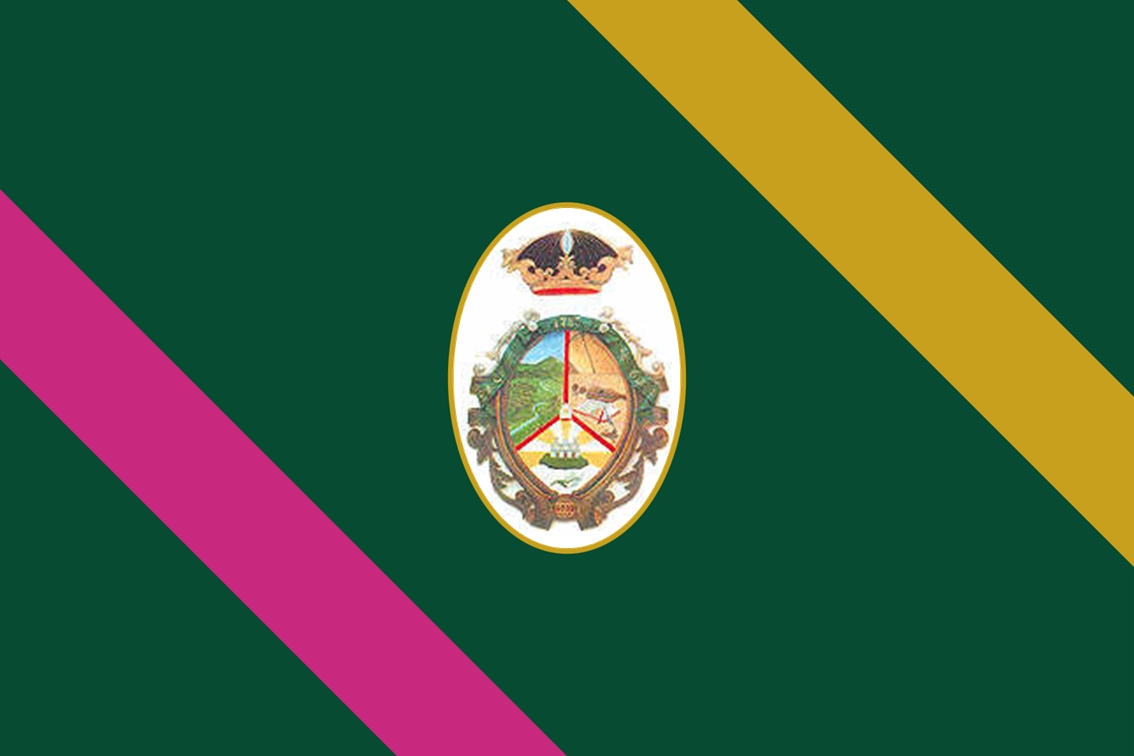
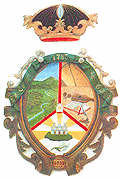
- Flag Coat of arms

- Location in Venezuela
- Coordinates: 9°59′47″N 67°00′50″W
- Country: Venezuela
- State: Aragua
- Municipal seat: San Casimiro

Government
  - Mayor: Mayker López Vegas ((PSUV))

Area
  - Total: 527.9 km^{2} (203.8 sq mi)

Population (2011)
  - Total: 25,540
  - Density: 48.38/km^{2} (125.3/sq mi)
- Time zone: UTC−4 (VET)
- Area code(s): 0246

The San Casimiro Municipality is one of the 18 municipalities (municipios) that makes up the Venezuelan state of Aragua and, according to the 2011 census by the National Institute of Statistics of Venezuela, the municipality has a population of 25,540. The town of San Casimiro is the shire town of the San Casimiro Municipality.

== Demographics ==
The San Casimiro Municipality, according to a 2007 population estimate by the National Institute of Statistics of Venezuela, has a population of 26,030 (up from 23,212 in 2000). This amounts to 1.6% of the state's population. The municipality's population density is 52.27 inhabitants per square kilometre (135.4/sq mi).

== Government ==
The mayor of the San Casimiro Municipality is Johnny Martinez, elected on October 31, 2004, with 44% of the vote. He replaced Luis Rodriguez shortly after the elections. The municipality is divided into four parishes; Capital San Casimiro, Güiripa, Ollas de Caramacate, and Valle Morín.

== See also ==
- San Casimiro
- Aragua
- Municipalities of Venezuela
