= Camatagua Municipality =

Camatagua Municipality Municipio Camatagua
- Municipality
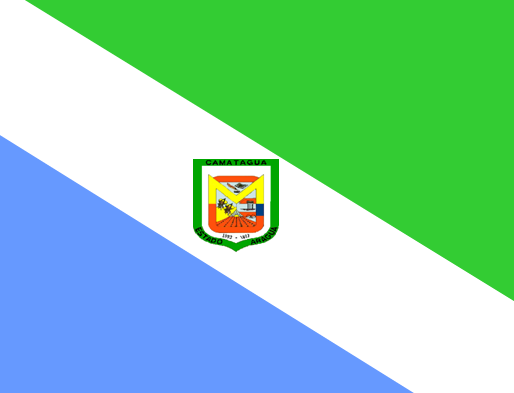
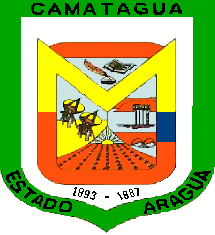
- Flag Coat of arms

- Location in Aragua

- Location in Venezuela
- Coordinates: 9°49′10″N 66°51′51″W
- Country: Venezuela
- State: Aragua
- Municipal seat: Camatagua

Government
  - Mayor: Rafael González (PSUV)

Area
  - Total: 896.1 km^{2} (346.0 sq mi)

Population (2011)
  - Total: 16,627
  - Density: 18.55/km^{2} (48.06/sq mi)
- Time zone: UTC−4 (VET)
- Area code(s): 0246
- Website: Official website

The Camatagua Municipality is one of the 18 municipalities (municipios) that makes up the Venezuelan state of Aragua and, according to the 2011 census by the National Institute of Statistics of Venezuela, the municipality has a population of 16,627. The town of Camatagua is the shire town of the Camatagua Municipality.

== Demographics ==
The Camatagua Municipality, according to a 2007 population estimate by the National Institute of Statistics of Venezuela, has a population of 17,674 (up from 15,691 in 2000). This amounts to 1% of the state's population. The municipality's population density is 22.66 inhabitants per square kilometre (58.7/sq mi).

== Government ==
The mayor of the Camatagua Municipality is Rafael González, re-elected on November 23, 2008, with 42% of the vote. The municipality is divided into two parishes; Capital Camatagua and Carmen de Cura.

== See also ==
- Camatagua
- Aragua
- Municipalities of Venezuela
