= San Sebastián Municipality =

San Sebastián Municipality Municipio San Sebastián
- Municipality
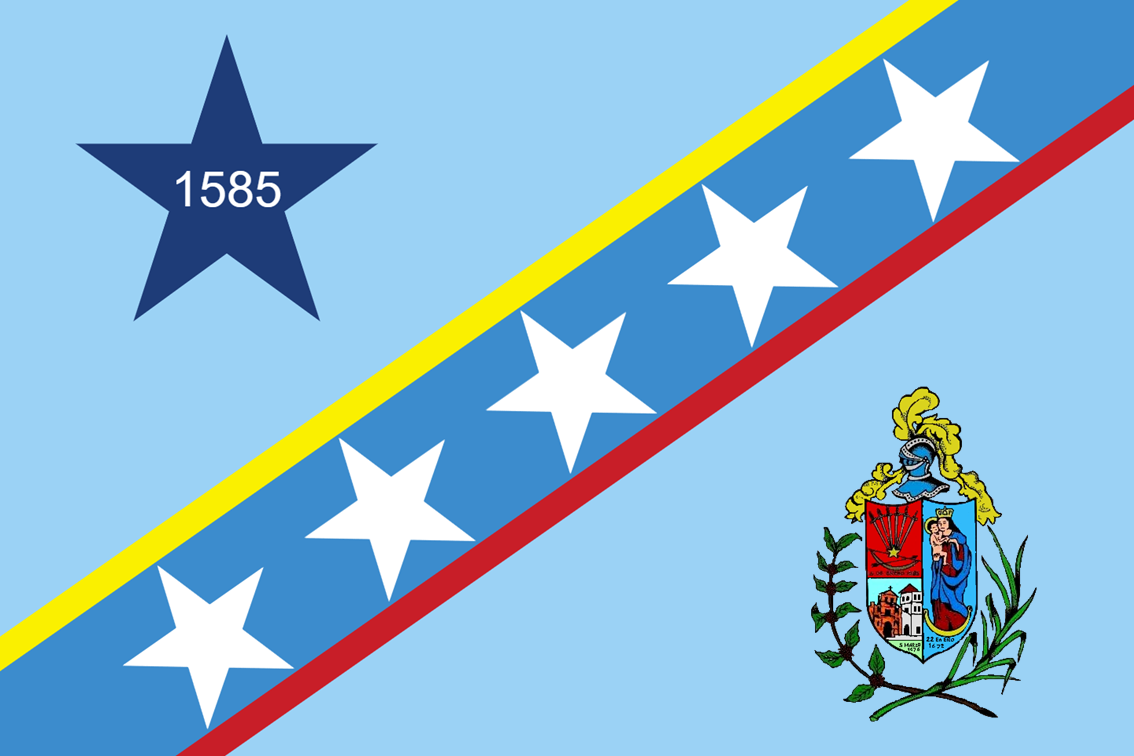
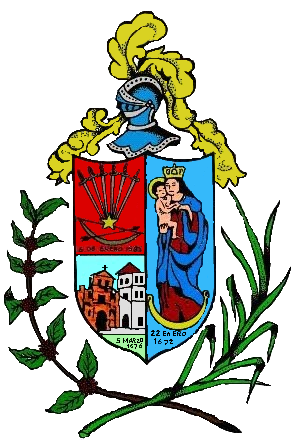
- Flag Coat of arms

- Location in Aragua

- Location in Venezuela
- Coordinates: 10°00′00″N 67°11′38″W
- Country: Venezuela
- State: Aragua
- Municipal seat: San Sebastián

Government
  - Mayor: Carlos Guillermo Miranda Escobar (PODEMOS)

Area
  - Total: 476.1 km^{2} (183.8 sq mi)

Population (2011)
  - Total: 23,279
  - Density: 48.90/km^{2} (126.6/sq mi)
- Time zone: UTC−4 (VET)
- Area code(s): 0246

The San Sebastián Municipality is one of the 18 municipalities (municipios) that makes up the Venezuelan state of Aragua and, according to the 2011 census by the National Institute of Statistics of Venezuela, the municipality has a population of 23,279. The town of San Sebastián is the shire town of the San Sebastián Municipality.

== Demographics ==
The San Sebastián Municipality, according to a 2007 population estimate by the National Institute of Statistics of Venezuela, has a population of 22,906 (up from 20,096 in 2000). This amounts to 1.4% of the state's population. The municipality's population density is 46.65 inhabitants per square kilometre (120.8/sq mi).

== Government ==
The mayor of the San Sebastián Municipality is Carlos Guillermo Miranda Escobar, elected on October 31, 2004, with 43% of the vote. He replaced Enrique Barrios shortly after the elections. The municipality is divided into one parishes; Capital San Sebastián.

== See also ==
- San Sebastián
- Aragua
- Municipalities of Venezuela
