= Meseta la Galera Natural Monument =

Protected area in Venezuela

Meseta la Galera Natural Monument Monumento Natural Meseta la Galera
- IUCN category III (natural monument or feature)
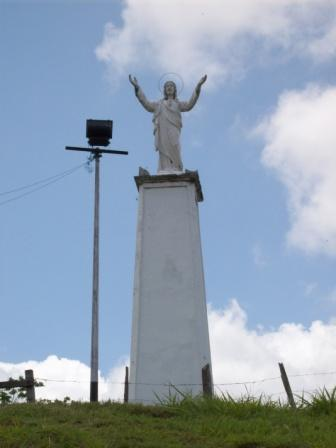
- View of the Monument to Christ the King on the Plateau

- Location within Venezuela
- Location: Venezuela
- Coordinates: 8°26′N 71°39′W
- Area: 0.95 km^{2} (0.37 sq mi)
- Established: June 5, 1992

The Meseta la Galera Natural Monument (Spanish: Monumento Natural Meseta la Galera) Also La Galera Plateau Is a protected area with the status of a natural monument consisting of a mountainous formation of the state of Mérida in the Andes of the South American country of Venezuela, in the form of Tepuy level plate of approximately 1 km in length. It has an area of 95 ha and has a height of 1055 msnm at its highest point and 935 m.s.n.m. At its lowest point is located between the parishes of El Llano and Tovar in the city center of the city separating this one from the Mocotíes River and the Hill "Loma de La Virgen".

It constitutes a geological formation of singular beauty and attractive landscape in the urban area, full of greenery which is considered as an important lung of the city. It was decreed a natural monument of Venezuela by the then president of the republic Carlos Andrés Pérez according to Decree No. 2352 of June 5, 1992. It was published in Official Gazette No. 4548 (Extraordinary) of March 26, 1993, as a Geomorphological Unit deposited during the Quaternary, of fluvial origin.

== See also ==
- List of national parks of Venezuela
- Pico Codazzi Natural Monument

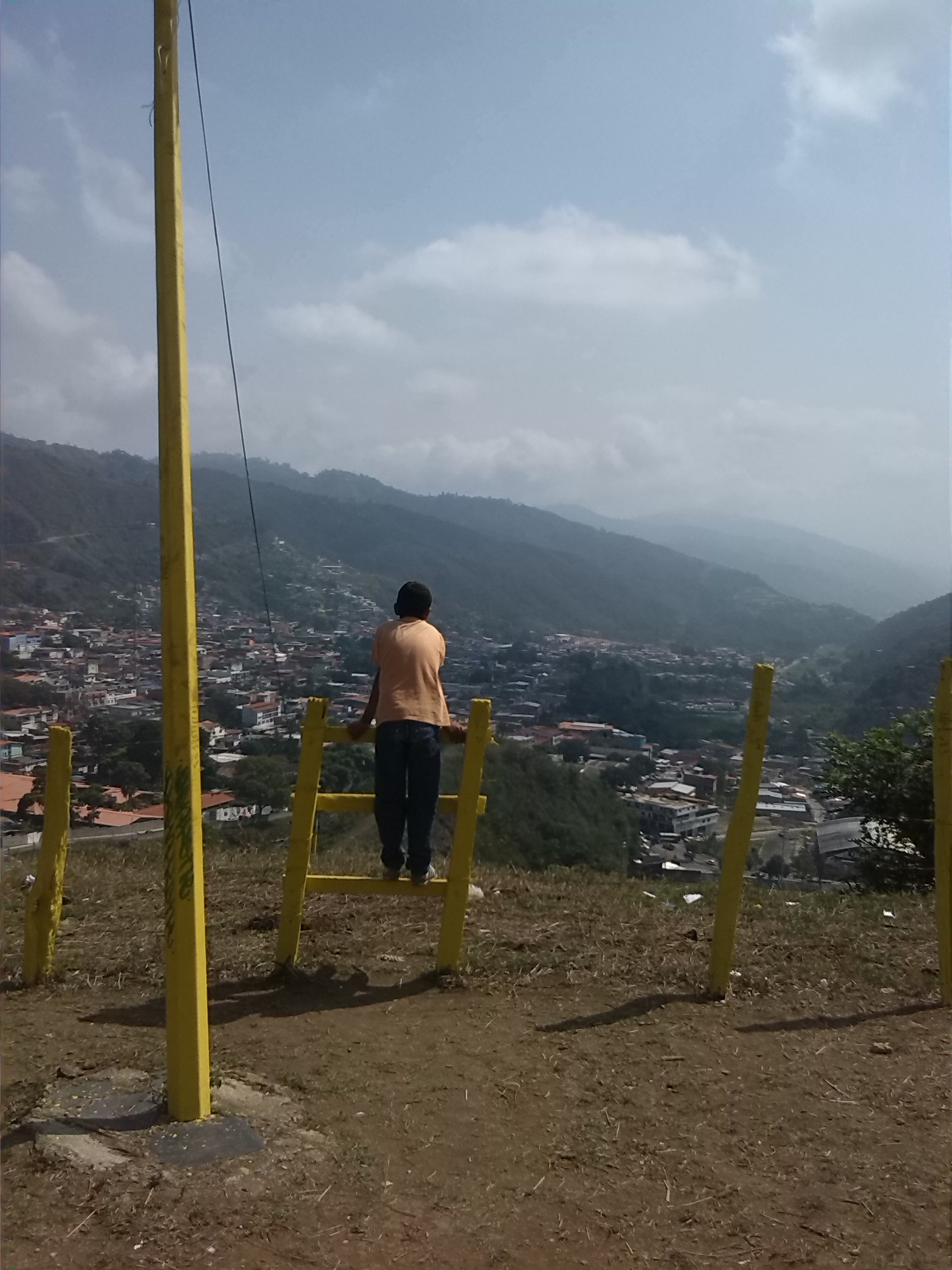
Other View
