= Francisco Linares Alcántara Municipality =

Francisco Linares Alcántara Municipality Municipio Francisco Linares Alcántara
- Municipality
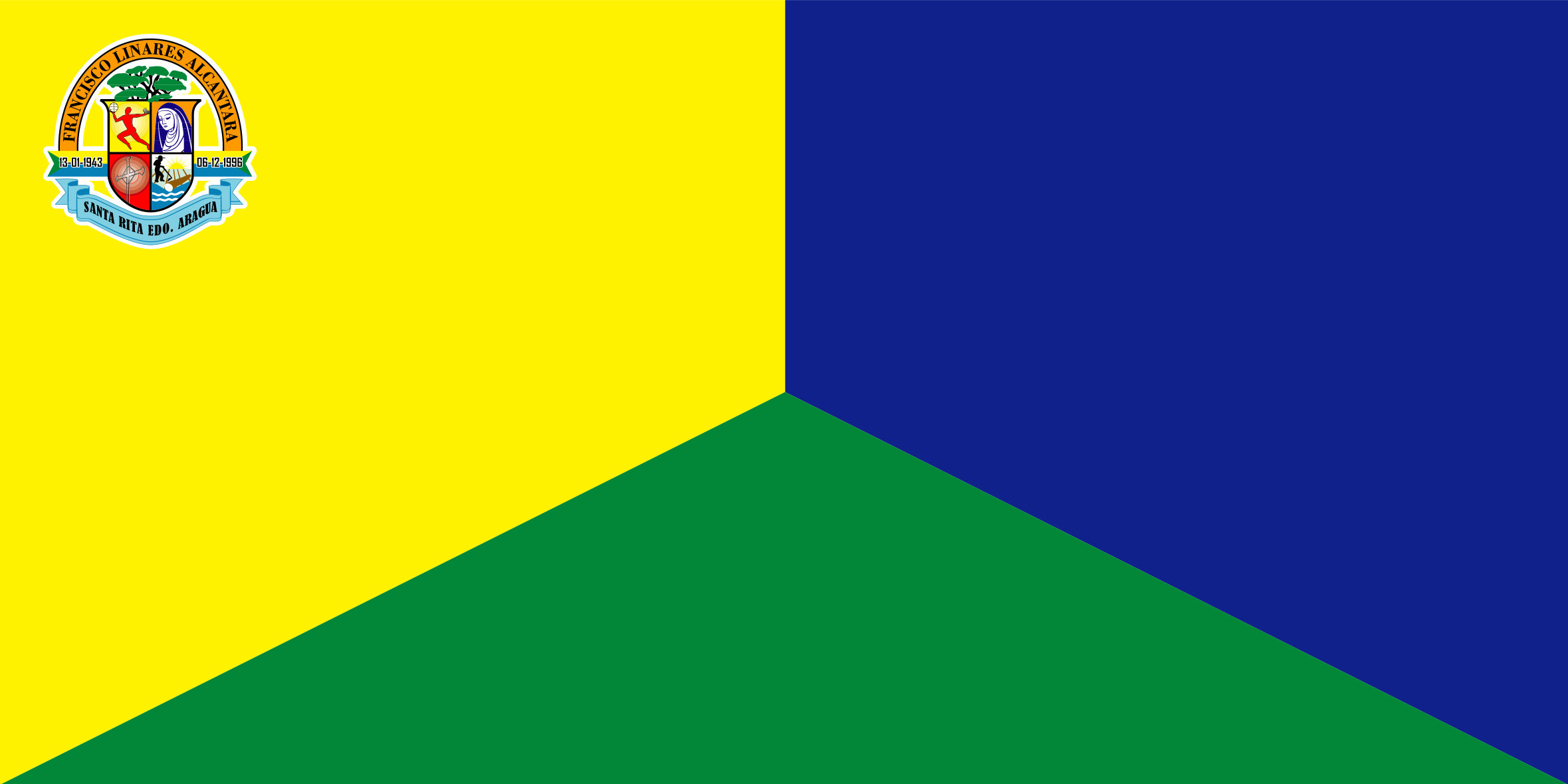
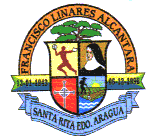
- Flag Coat of arms

- Location in Aragua

- Location in Venezuela
- Coordinates: 10°12′30″N 67°32′30″W
- Country: Venezuela
- State: Aragua
- Municipal seat: Santa Rita

Government
  - Mayor: Raiza Márquez (PSUV)

Area
  - Total: 18.6 km^{2} (7.2 sq mi)

Population (2011)
  - Total: 123,122
  - Density: 6,620/km^{2} (17,100/sq mi)
- Time zone: UTC−4 (VET)
- Area code(s): 0243
- Website: Official website

The Francisco Linares Alcántara Municipality is one of the 18 municipalities (municipios) that makes up the Venezuelan state of Aragua and, according to the 2011 census by the National Institute of Statistics of Venezuela, the municipality has a population of 123,122. The town of Santa Rita is the shire town of the Francisco Linares Alcántara Municipality.

== Demographics ==
The Francisco Linares Alcántara Municipality, according to a 2007 population estimate by the National Institute of Statistics of Venezuela, has a population of 135,873 (up from 118,146 in 2000). This amounts to 8.2% of the state's population. The municipality's population density is 5,661.38 inhabitants per square kilometre (14,662.9/sq mi).

== Government ==
The mayor of the Francisco Linares Alcántara Municipality is Raiza Márquez, elected on November 23, 2008, with 56% of the vote. She replaced Hugo R. Peña A. shortly after the elections. The municipality is divided into three parishes; Capital Francisco Linares Alcántara, Francisco de Miranda (separated from Capital Francisco Linares Alcantara parish effective January 30, 1995), and Monseñor Feliciano González (separated from Francisco de Miranda parish effective December 16, 1997).

== See also ==
- Santa Rita
- Aragua
- Municipalities of Venezuela
