= Palo Negro =

Palo Negro may refer to:

- Palo Negro, Santiago del Estero, a municipality in Argentina
- Palo Negro, Aragua, the municipal seat of Libertador Municipality, Aragua, Venezuela
- Dalbergia retusa, or Palo Negro, a Central and North American tree
