= Santos Michelena Municipality =

Santos Michelena Municipality Municipio Santos Michelena
- Municipality
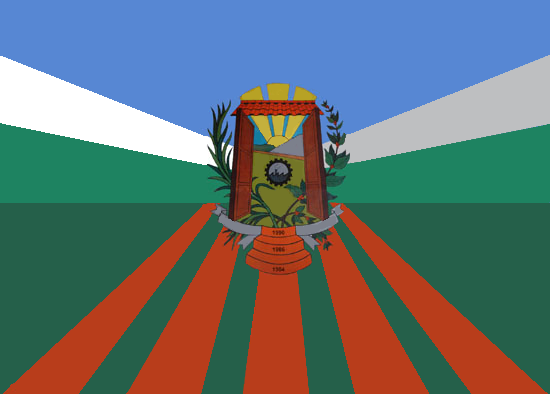
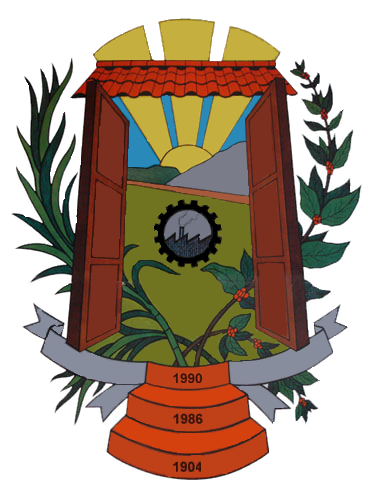
- Flag Coat of arms

- Location in Aragua

- Location in Venezuela
- Coordinates: 10°11′14″N 67°09′14″W
- Country: Venezuela
- State: Aragua

Government
  - Mayor: Régulo La Cruz Álvarez (PSUV)

Area
  - Total: 207.9 km^{2} (80.3 sq mi)

Population (2011)
  - Total: 38,574
  - Density: 185.5/km^{2} (480.5/sq mi)
- Time zone: UTC−4 (VET)
- Area code(s): 0244
- Website: Official website

The Santos Michelena Municipality is one of the 18 municipalities (municipios) that make up the Venezuelan state of Aragua. According to the 2011 census by the National Institute of Statistics of Venezuela, the municipality has a population of 38,574. The town of Las Tejerías is the shire town of the Santos Michelena Municipality. The municipality is named for the Venezuelan politician Santos Michelena.

== Demographics ==
The Santos Michelena Municipality, according to a 2007 population estimate by the National Institute of Statistics of Venezuela, has a population of 44,409 (up from 38,638 in 2000). This amounts to 2.7% of the state's population. The municipality's population density is 201.86 inhabitants per square kilometre (522.8/sq mi).

== Government ==
The mayor of the Santos Michelena Municipality is Reinaldo Lorca, re-elected on October 31, 2004 with 32% of the votes. The municipality is divided into two parishes: Capital Santos Michelena and Tiara.
