= Pico Codazzi Natural Monument =

Pico Codazzi Natural Monument Monumento Natural Pico Codazzi
- IUCN category III (natural monument or feature)
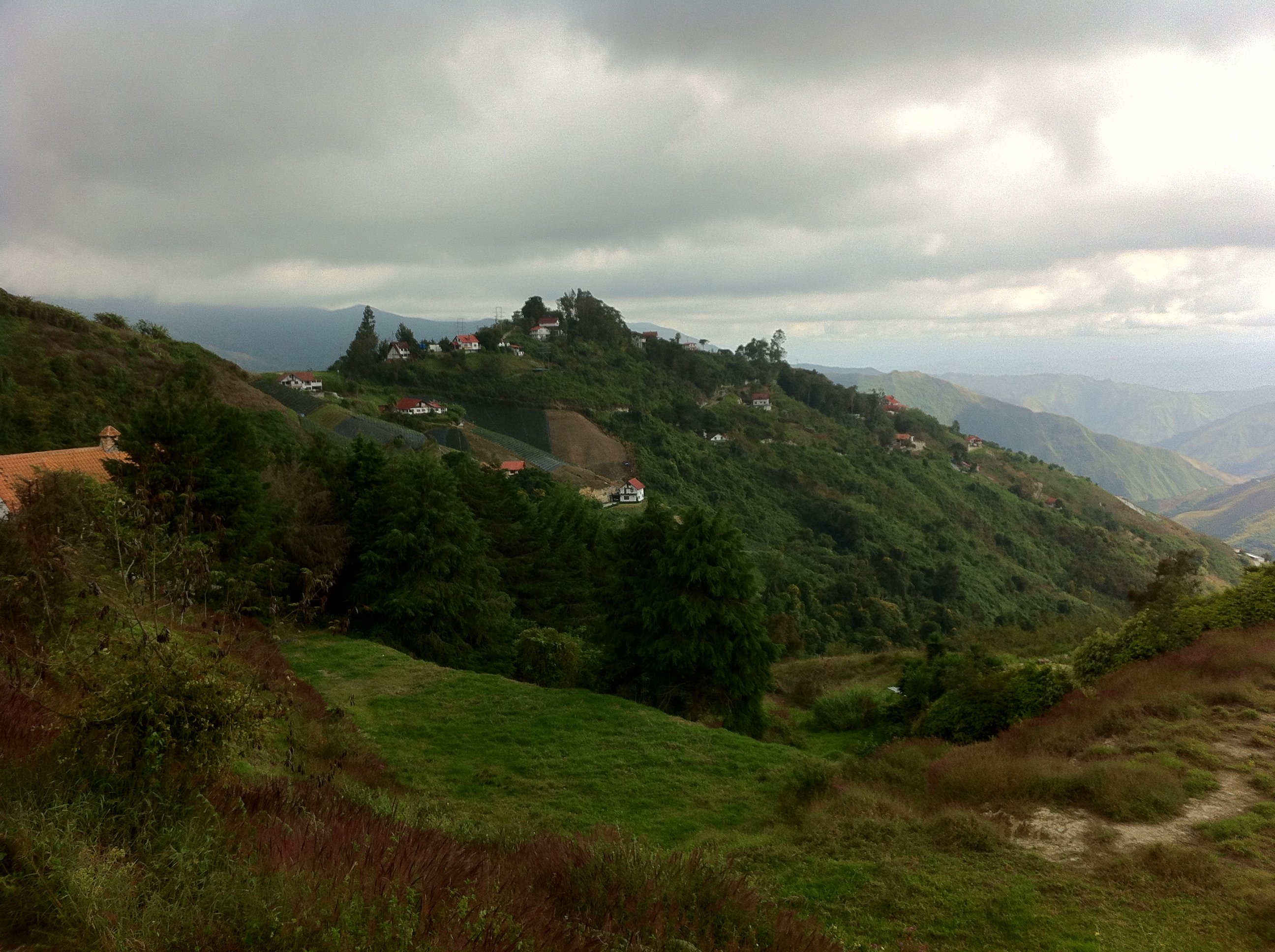

- Location within Venezuela
- Location: Venezuela
- Coordinates: 10°24′N 67°18′W
- Area: 118.50 km^{2} (45.75 sq mi)
- Established: June 5, 1991

The Pico Codazzi Natural Monument (Spanish: Monumento Natural Pico Codazzi) Also Codazzi Peak Natural Monument Is a protected area with the status of a natural monument located in the Aragua State in the center of northern Venezuela. It was created in 1991 to connect the Henri Pittier National Park with the Macarao National Park and constitutes one of the highest peaks of the Cordillera de la Costa. It covers an area of 11,850 ha.

Its highest peak, the Codazzi peak, also called the picacho, has height references that vary between 1818 msnm2 and 2429 msnm, making it one of the highest mountains of the Aragua State and the Cordillera de la Costa.

The Pico Codazzi Natural Monument is located in the Ribas municipality. The eastern boundary of Pico Codazzi is determined by the road that connects La Victoria with Colonia Tovar.

== See also ==
- Agustín Codazzi
- List of national parks of Venezuela
- Formaciones de Tepuyes Natural Monument
