= San Casimiro =

- San Casimiro de Güiripa
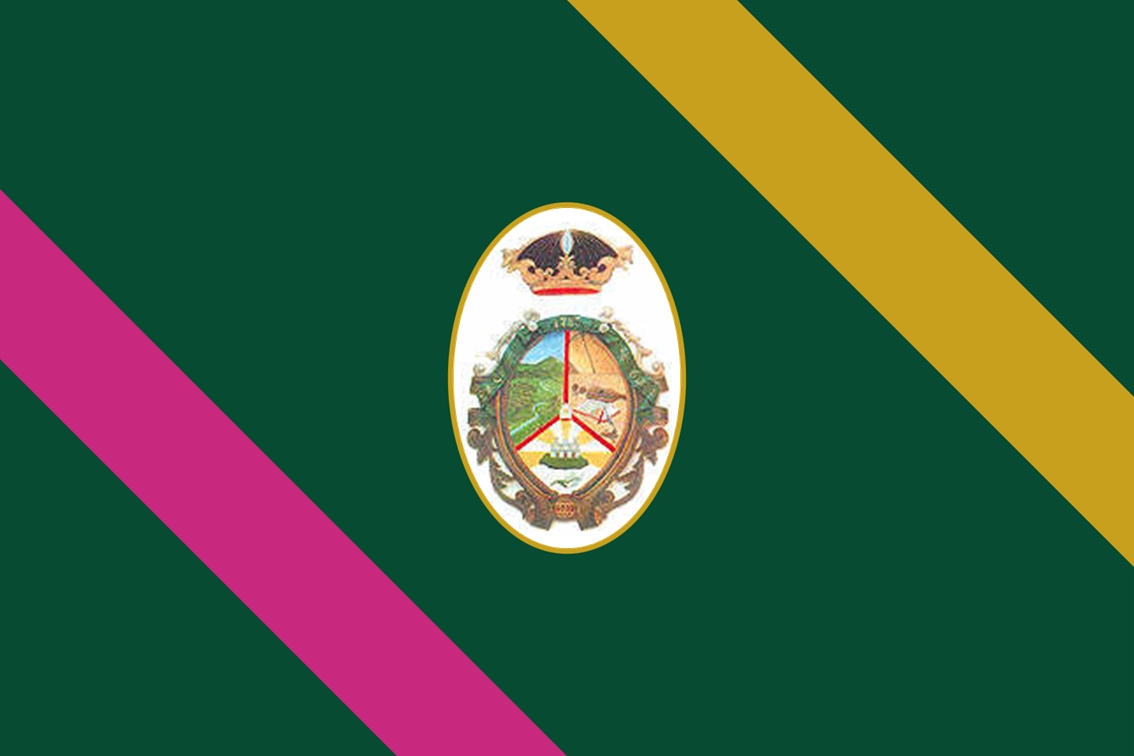
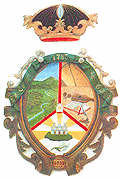
- Flag Coat of arms

- Location within Venezuela
- Coordinates: 10°3′0″N 67°1′0″W
- Country: Venezuela
- State: Aragua
- Municipality: San Casimiro Municipality
- Time zone: UTC−4 (VET)
- Climate: Aw

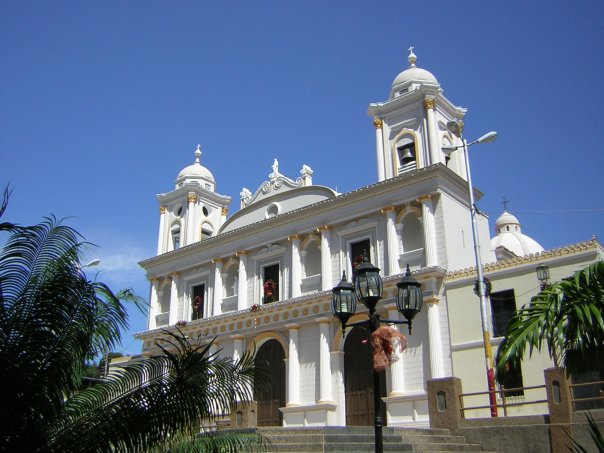
Church of San Casimiro

San Casimiro de Güiripa is a city in the state of Aragua, Venezuela. It is the shire town of the San Casimiro Municipality. It is named after Saint Casimir.

== See also ==
- List of cities and towns in Venezuela
