= José Angel Lamas Municipality =

José Angel Lamas Municipality Municipio José Angel Lamas
- Municipality
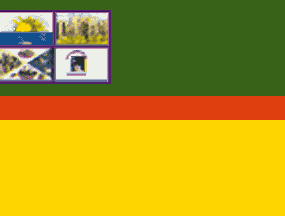
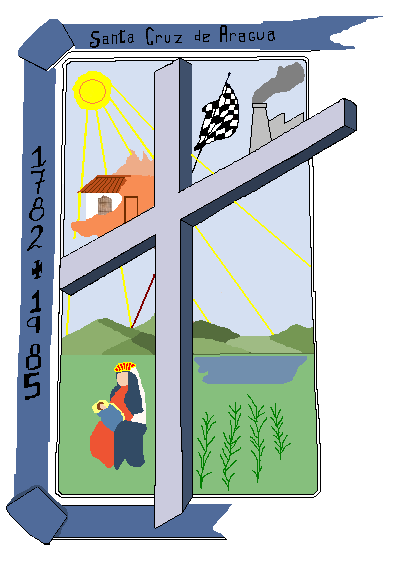
- Flag Coat of arms

- Location in Aragua

- Location in Venezuela
- Coordinates: 10°09′26″N 67°30′32″W
- Country: Venezuela
- State: Aragua
- Municipal seat: Santa Cruz

Government
  - Mayor: Tony García Blanco (PSUV)

Area
  - Total: 53.3 km^{2} (20.6 sq mi)

Population (2011)
  - Total: 32,981
  - Density: 619/km^{2} (1,600/sq mi)
- Time zone: UTC−4 (VET)
- Area code(s): 0243

The José Angel Lamas Municipality is one of the 18 municipalities (municipios) that makes up the Venezuelan state of Aragua and, according to the 2011 census by the National Institute of Statistics of Venezuela, the municipality has a population of 32,981. The town of Santa Cruz is the municipal seat of the José Angel Lamas Municipality. The municipality is named for the Venezuelan composer José Ángel Lamas.

== Demographics ==
The José Angel Lamas Municipality, according to a 2007 population estimate by the National Institute of Statistics of Venezuela, has a population of 33,513 (up from 28,263 in 2000). This amounts to 2% of the state's population. The municipality's population density is 1,675.65 inhabitants per square kilometre (4,339.9/sq mi).

== Government ==
The mayor of the José Angel Lamas Municipality is Ybis Pérez, elected on November 23, 2008, with 61% of the vote. She replaced Nancy López shortly after the elections. The municipality contains one parish; Capital José Angel Lamas.
