= Flag of Aragua =

Flag of Aragua state

The flag of Aragua, one of the 23 states of Venezuela is a bicolor red and yellow banner, divided into four triangles. The upper and lower triangles are red, the left and right triangles are yellow. The red represents strength, valor, fidelity, joy and the honour to heroes of the independence struggle. The yellow colour represents the tropical climate of the state and its noble and charitable spirit. In the centre of the flag there is there is the Aragua state coat of arms. The coat of arms includes the image of a woman carrying a laurel wreath and a palm leaf, a saman tree and a burning house (representing the hacienda of the family of Simon Bolívar, which was burnt down during the 1814 Battle of San Mateo). At the bottom of the coat of arms there are inscriptions stating "Febrero de 1814" ('February 1814', alluding to the Battle of La Victoria) and 'Marzo de 1814' ('March 1814', alluding to the Battle of San Mateo).

The flag was adopted in 1930. The legislation regulating the flag was modified in 2002. In December 2023 the chairman of the Bolivarian State Legislative Council of Aragua announced that a reform of the legislation would be reviewed by the Council in 2024.
