= Santa Cruz, Aragua =

Santa Cruz
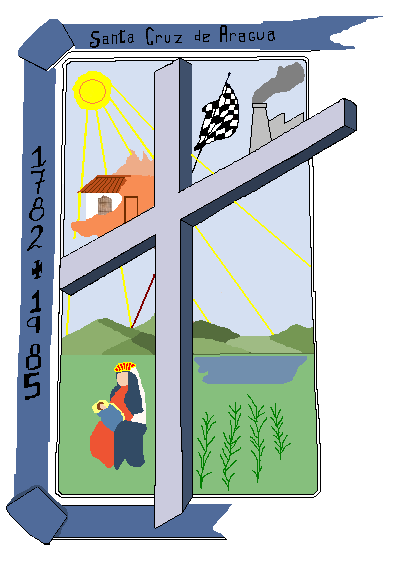
- Coat of arms

- Location within Venezuela
- Coordinates: 10°10′55″N 67°30′09″W
- Country: Venezuela
- State: Aragua
- Municipality: José Angel Lamas Municipality

Population
  - Total: 29,773
- Time zone: UTC−4 (VET)
- Climate: Aw

Santa Cruz de Aragua is a city in the state of Aragua, Venezuela, and part of the metropolitan area of Maracay. It is the shire town of the José Angel Lamas Municipality.

== See also ==
- List of cities and towns in Venezuela
