= Palo Negro, Santiago del Estero =

Coordinates: 29°41′S 62°08′W

Palo Negro
- Municipality and village
- Interactive map of Palo Negro
- Country: Argentina
- Province: Santiago del Estero Province
- Time zone: UTC−3 (ART)

Palo Negro is a municipality and village in Santiago del Estero Province in Argentina.
