= Formaciones de Tepuyes Natural Monument =

Protected natural space in Venezuela

Formaciones de Tepuyes Natural Monument Monumento Natural Formaciones de Tepuyes
- IUCN category III (natural monument or feature)
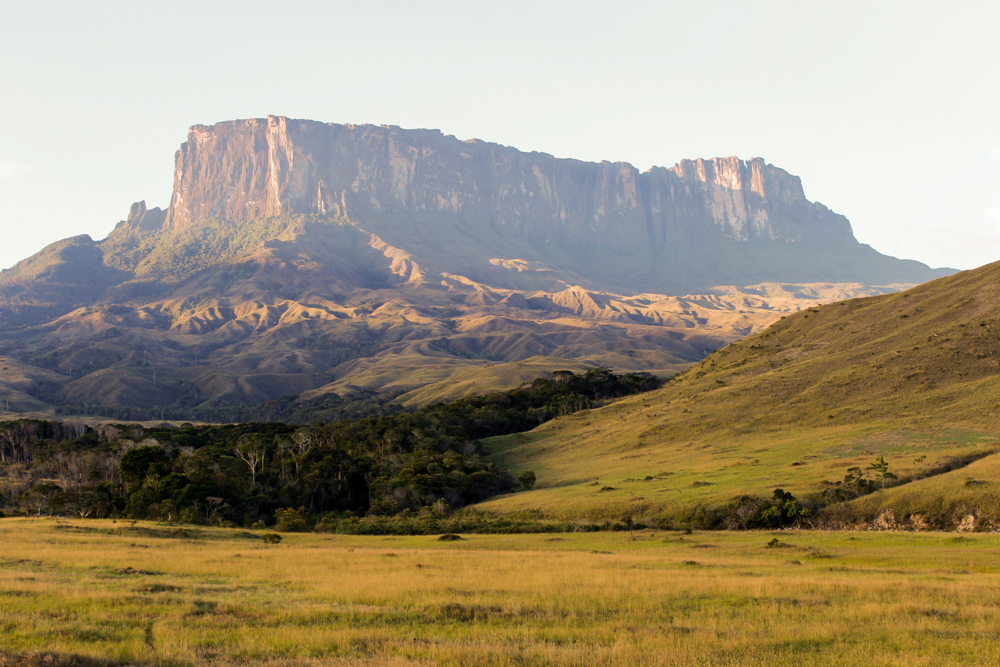
- Kukenan

- Location within Venezuela
- Location: Venezuela
- Coordinates: 5°31′N 66°02′W
- Area: 10,698 km^{2} (4,131 sq mi)
- Established: January 18, 1991

The Formaciones de Tepuyes Natural Monument, (Spanish: Monumento Natural Formaciones de Tepuyes) also known as Formaciones de Tepuyes, Is a protected natural space since 1991, located in Venezuela more specifically in Amazonas and Bolívar states.

== Monument ==
The total area reaches 1,069,820 hectares of forest formations where mountain formations are known as tepuy (tepui). The tepuys are rock formations with flat peaks and vertical escarpments. Tepuys are residual forms of the Guayana Massif, constituted by sandstones, quartzites and granites of the pre-Inca era, with intrusions of dia- bric rocks. Ecosystems with endemic species have been developed at their summits and on their slopes.

In the state of Bolívar there are twelve protected tepuy formations as a natural monument, while in the state of Amazonas thirteen have been selected. The criteria for its choice were the configuration, the scenic beauty and its abundant biodiversity.

In the state of Bolívar, Uei Tepuy (2,150 m), Kukenan Tepuy (2,650 m), Yuruani Tepuy (2,400 m), Karaurín Tepuy (2,500 m) and Ilú Tepuy (2,700 m).

The most outstanding of the state of Amazonas are the Cerro Yaví (2,300 m), the Parú Euaja massif (2,200 m) and the Cerro Tamacuari (2,300 m).

== Gallery ==
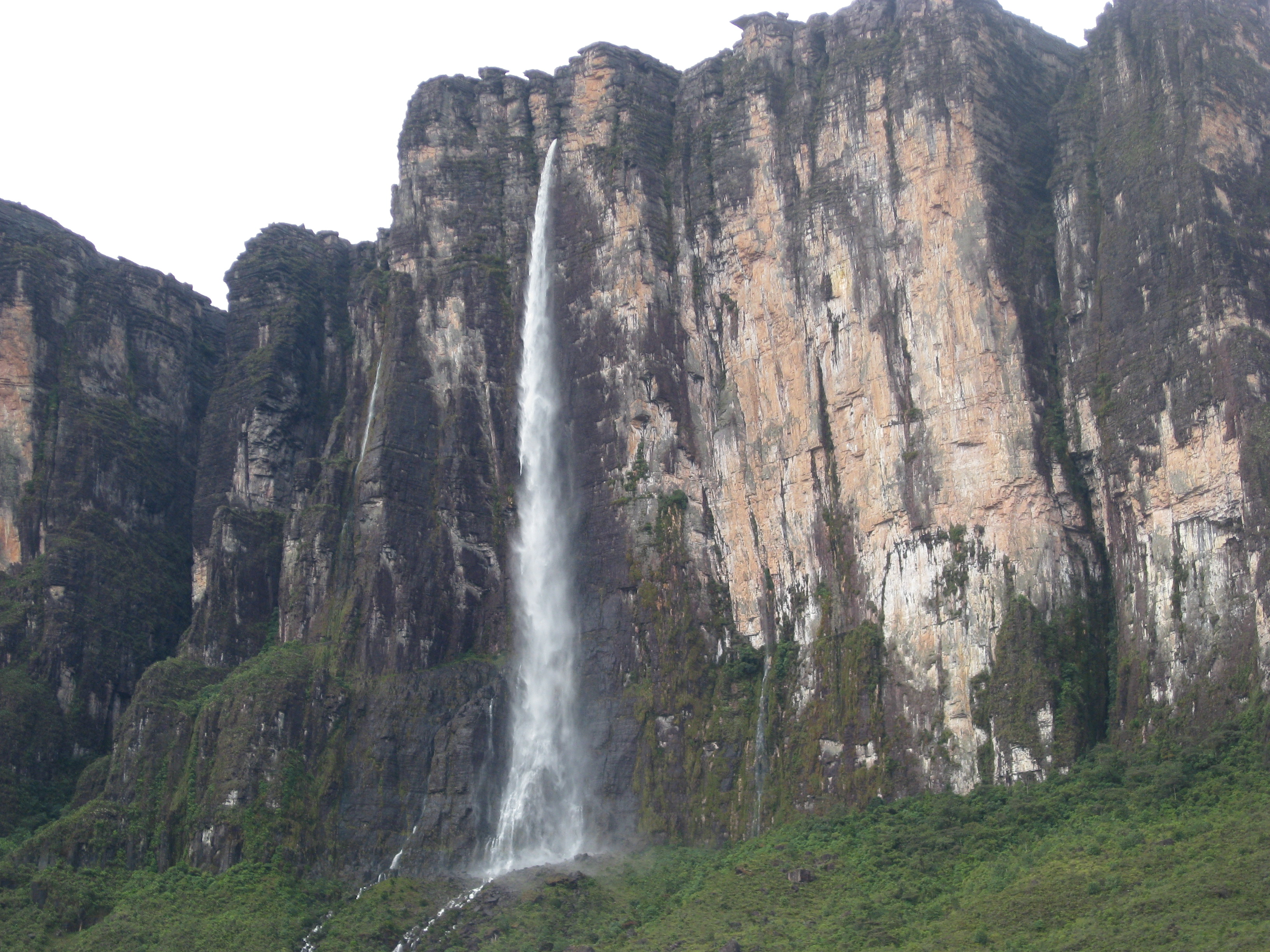
Kukenan Falls

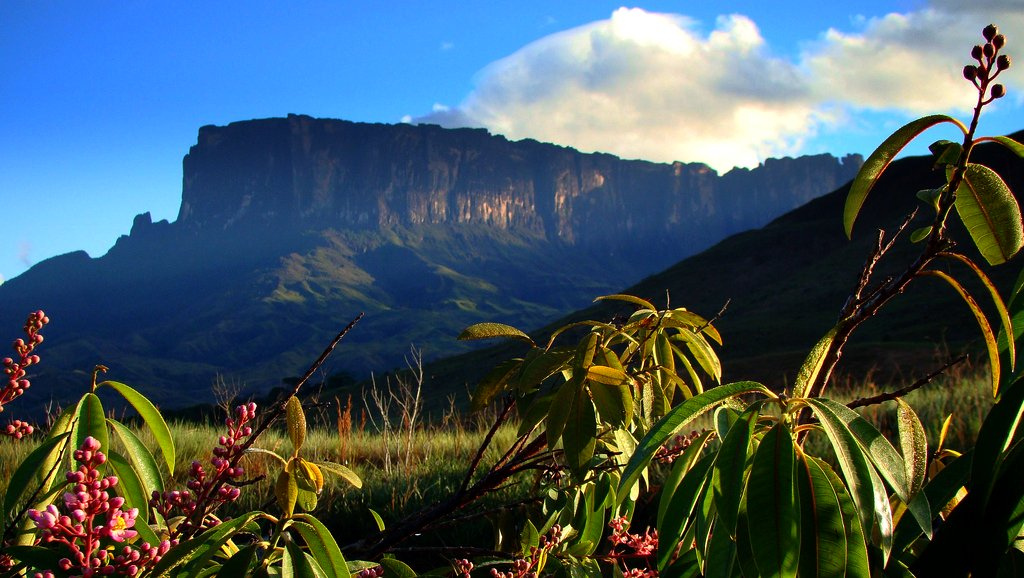
Kukenán viewed from the base

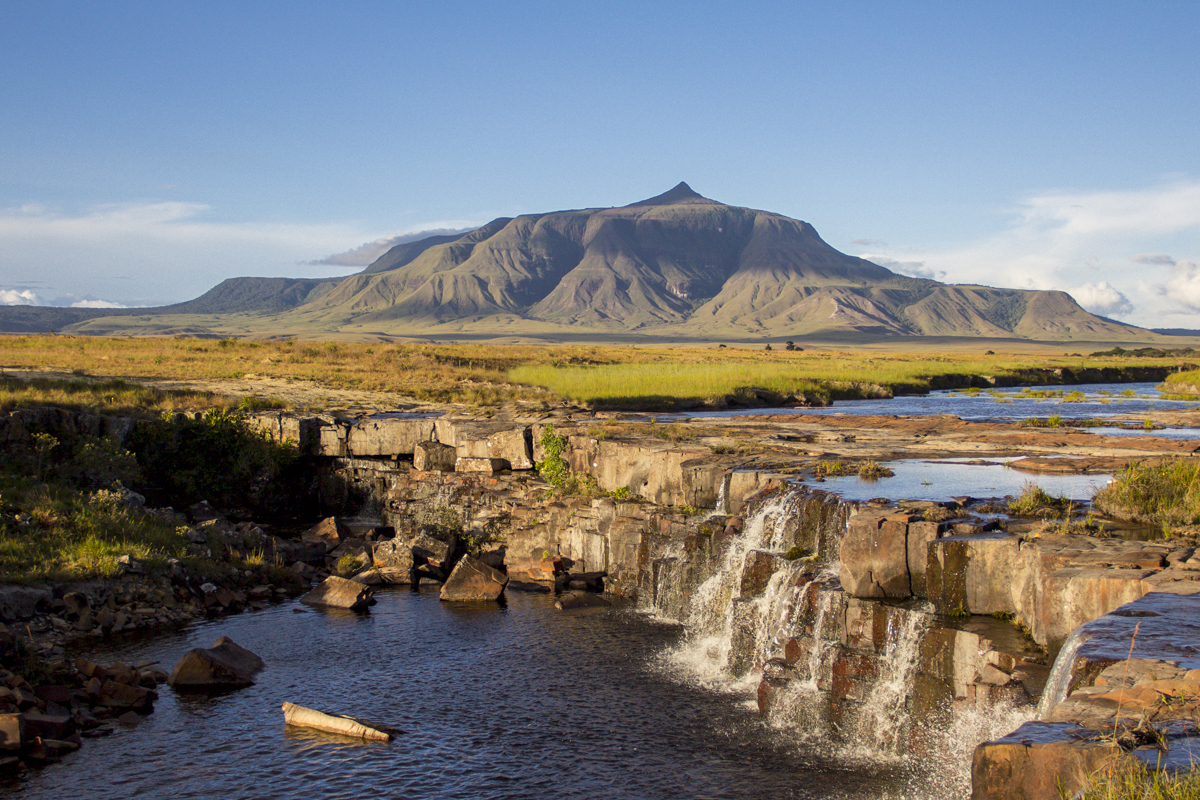
Uei-tepui

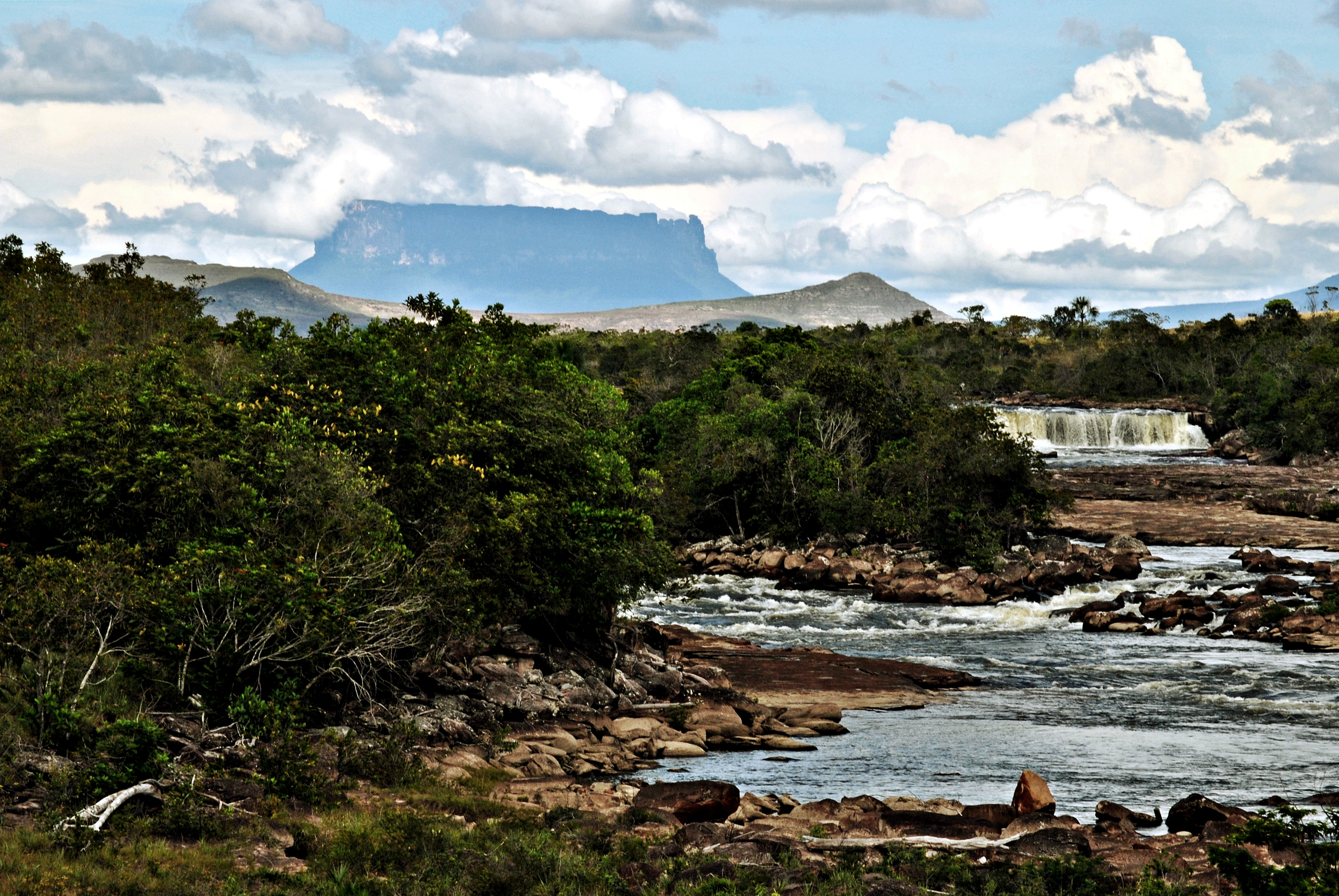
Yuruani-Tepui

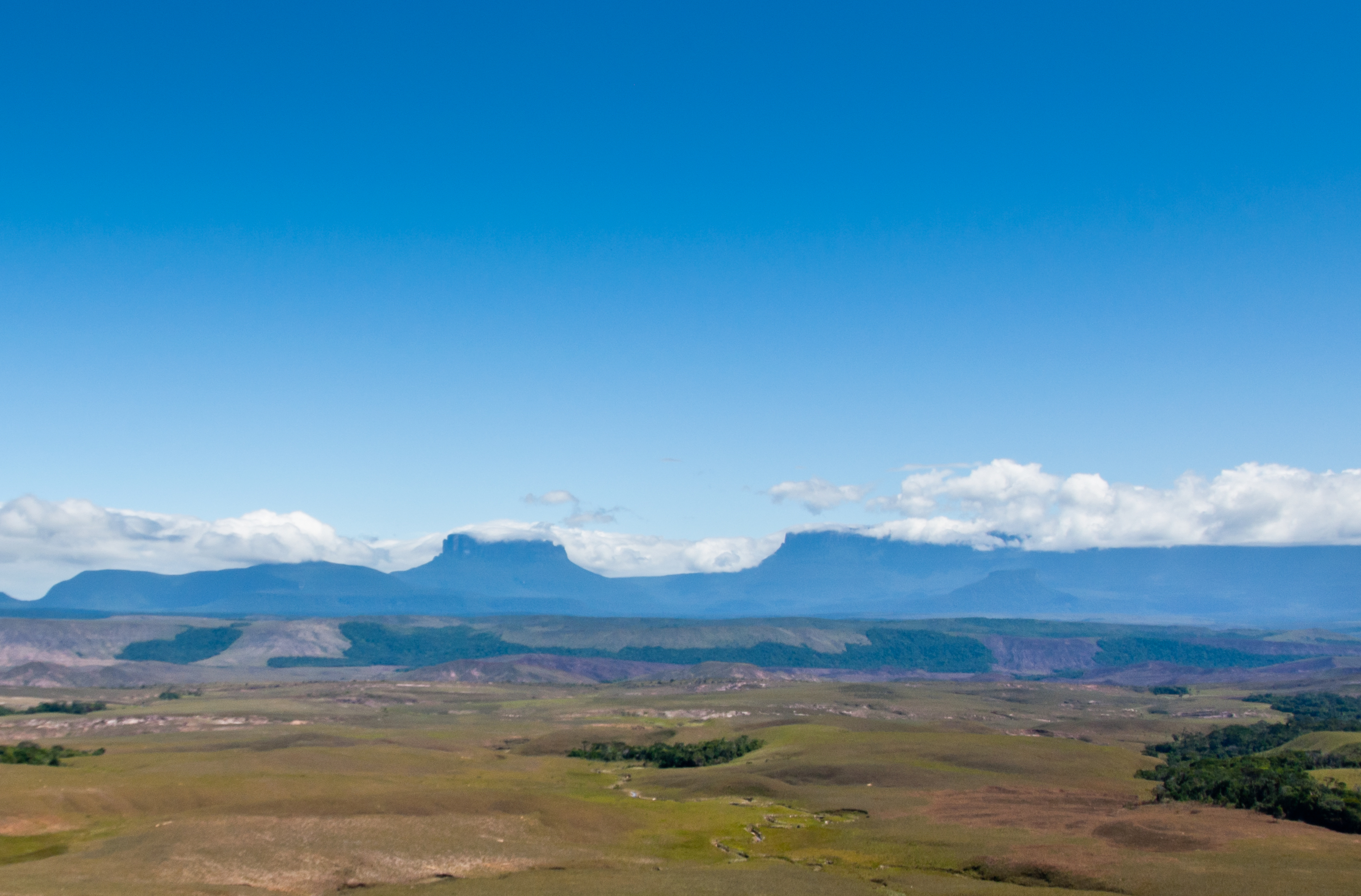
Yuruani y Kukenan

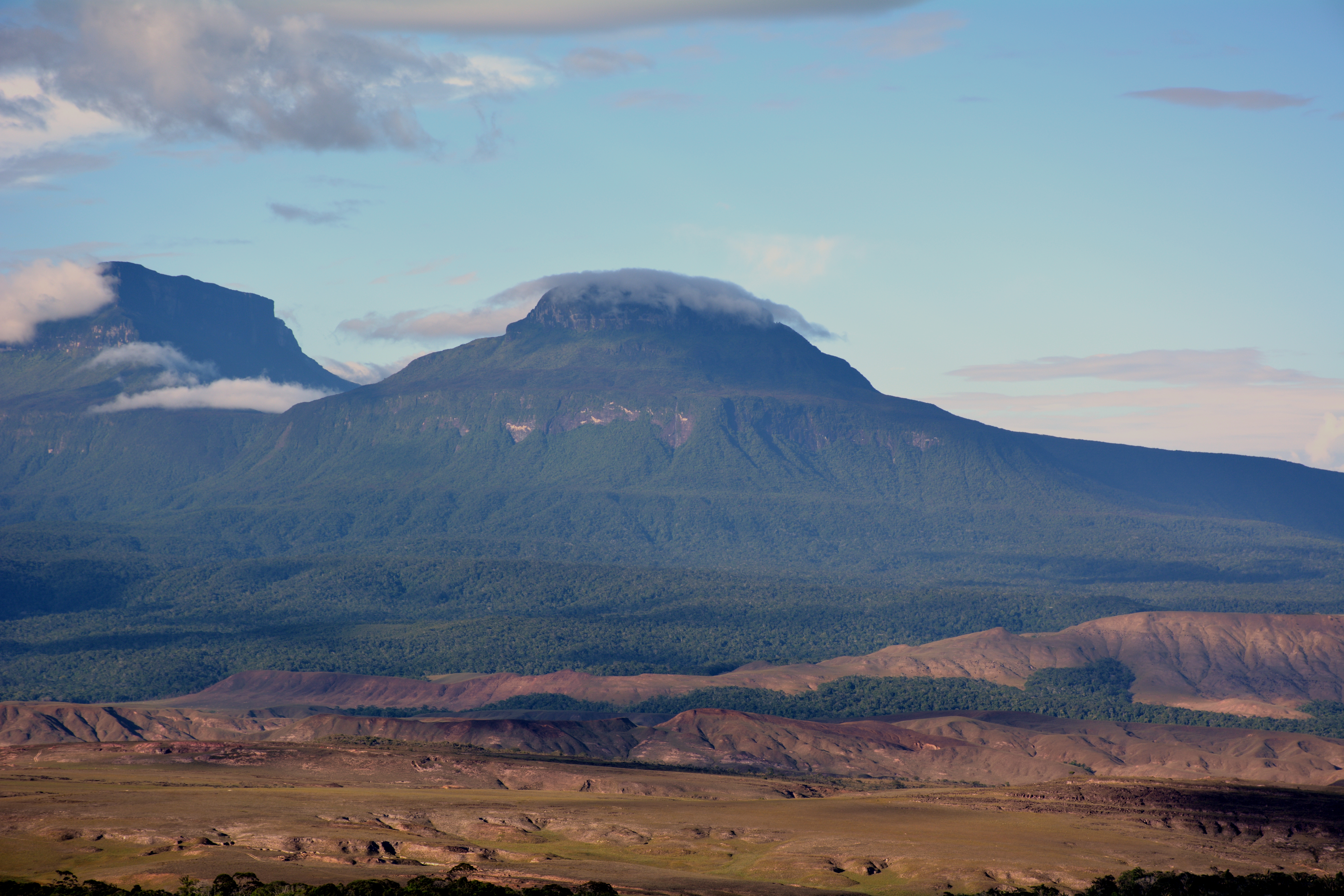
Karaurín-tepui

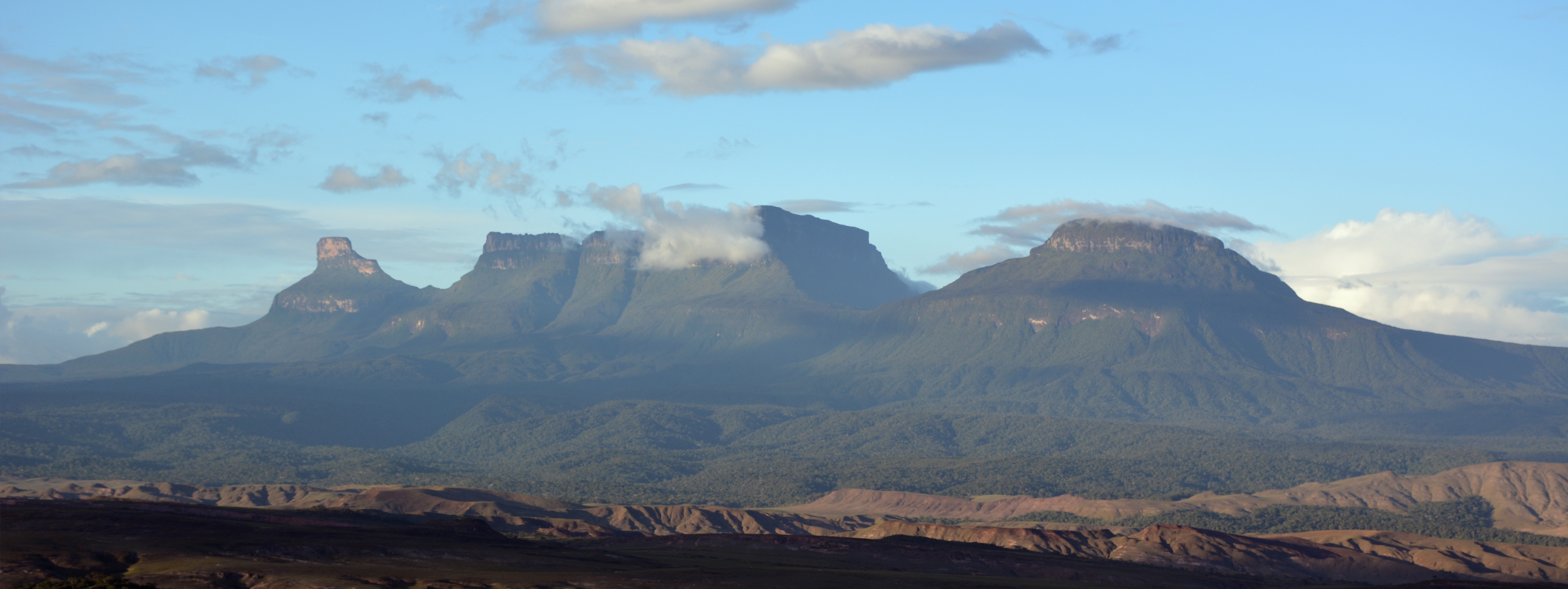
Ilu y Karaurín-tepui

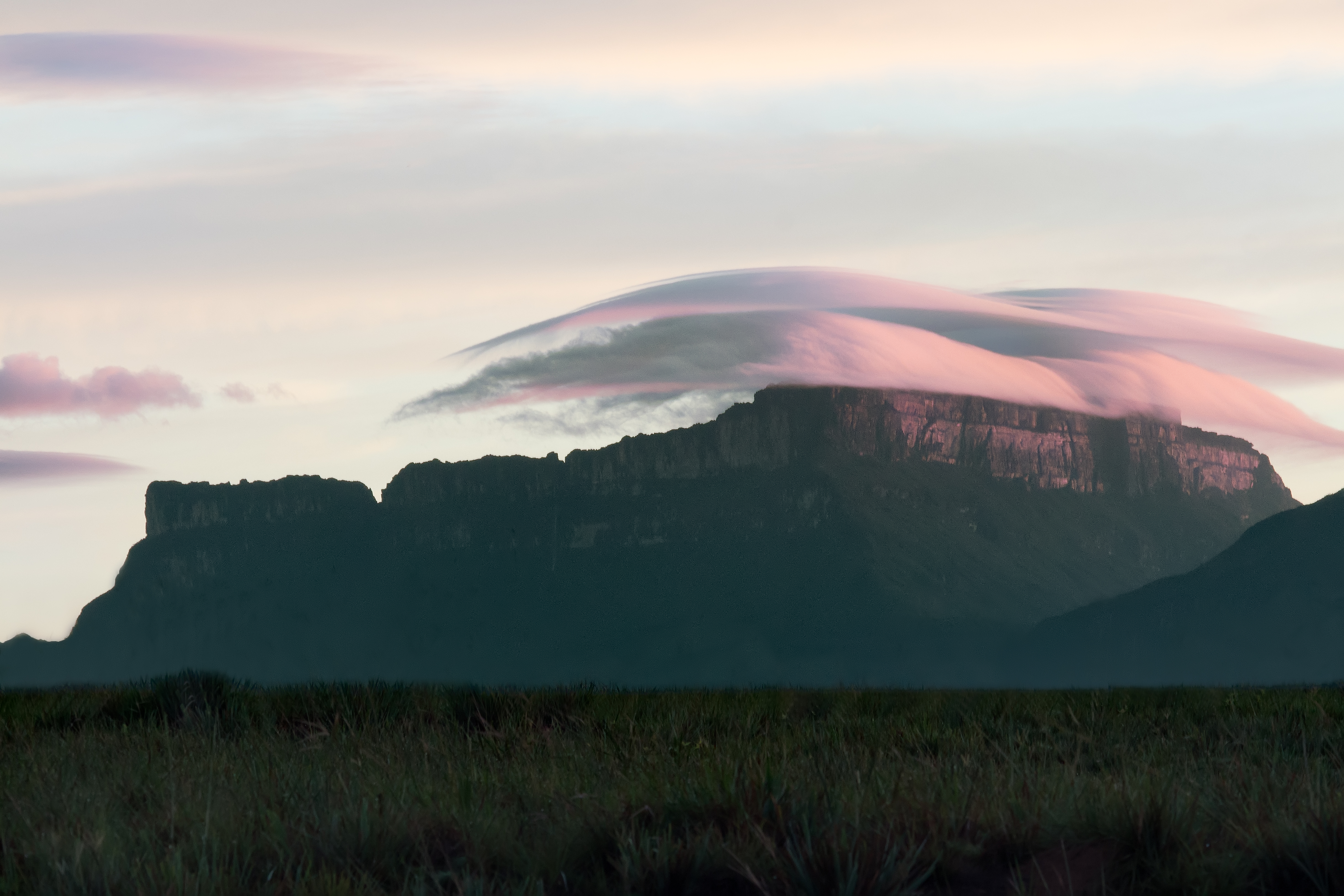
Ilu-Tepui

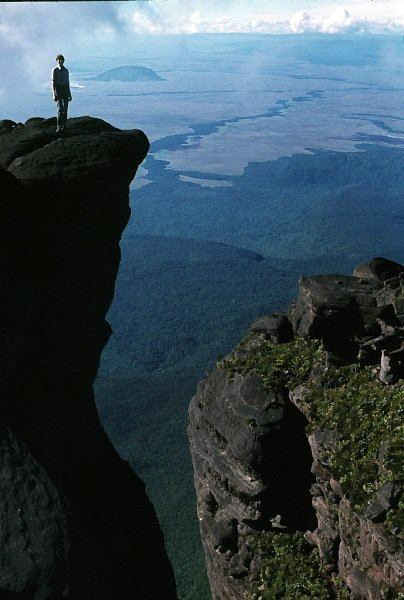

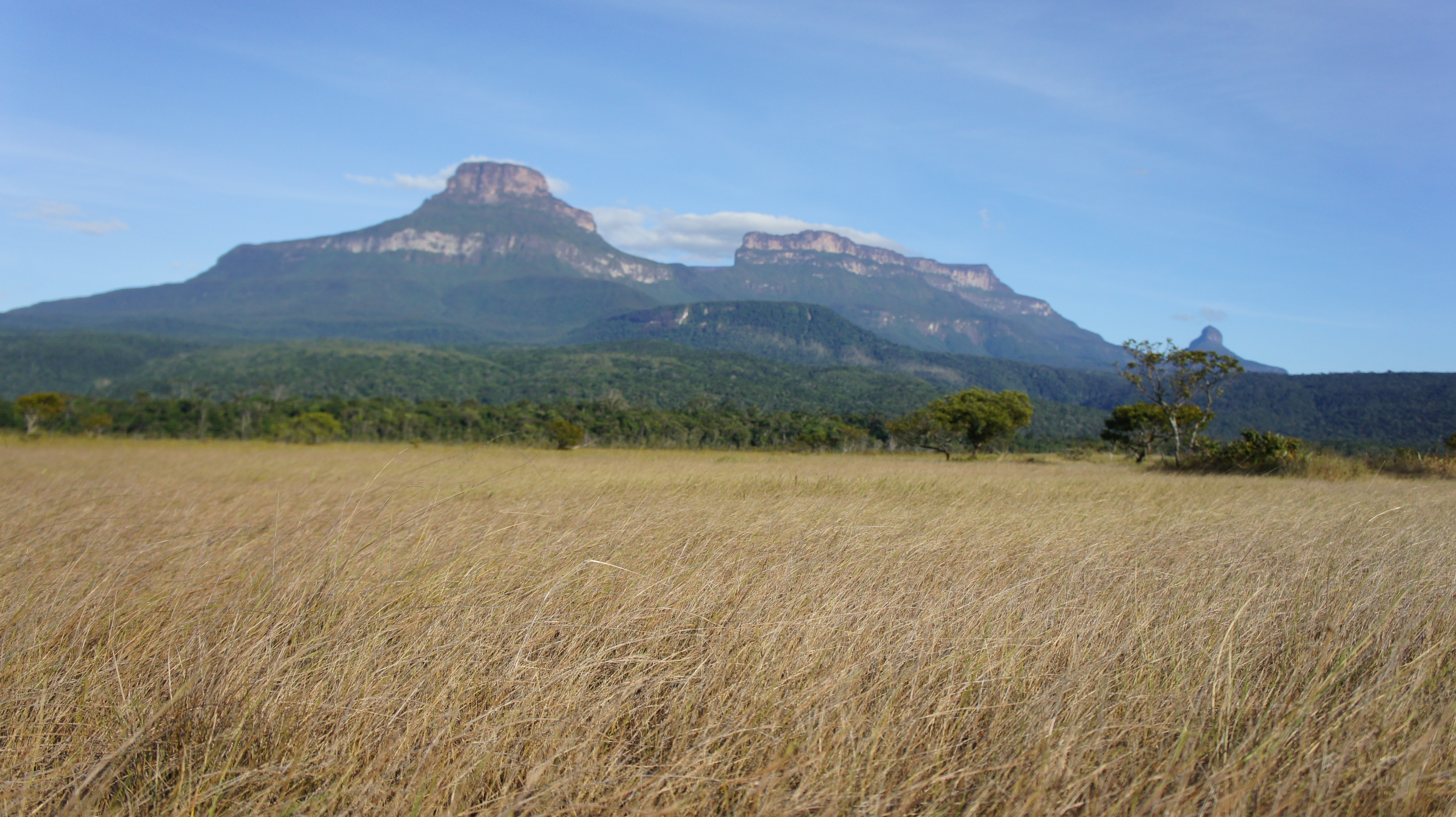

== See also ==
- Gran Sabana
- Canaima National Park
