= Manuel Aguirre (priest) =

Spanish Catholic priest and activist (1904–1968)

The Reverend Manuel Aguirre SJ
- Born: Manuel Aguirre Elorriaga; 15 May 1904; Maruri-Jatabe, Spain
- Died: 28 February 1969 (aged 64); Caracas, Venezuela

Manuel Aguirre Elorriaga (15 May 1904 – 28 February 1969) was a Spanish Catholic priest and Jesuit who was a major influence on Catholic social teaching and Christian democracy in Venezuela. He formed the labour organisations Caracas Workers' Circle and Confederación de Sindicatos Autónomos de Venezuela.

Born in Spain, Aguirre received a religious education in Spain, Belgium, Austria, and Italy. He first came to Venezuela in 1926, and taught there for three years before returning to Europe. He returned to Venezuela in 1937, and worked as a teacher for decades. Future presidents Rafael Caldera and Luis Herrera Campins were among his students.

== Early life and education ==
Manuel Aguirre Elorriaga was born in Maruri-Jatabe, Spain, on 15 May 1904. He was educated at the Castle of Xavier and joined the Jesuits in Gipuzkoa on 14 October 1919. He conducted his juniorate at the Sanctuary of Loyola from 1921 to 1923. He graduated with a doctorate in philosophy from the Colegio Máximo San Francisco Javier in Oña in 1926.

President Manuel Azaña expelled the Jesuits from Spain in 1932, and Aguirre continued his education in Marneffe, Belgium. He was ordained as a priest on 20 June 1932. In 1933, he completed his licentiate in theology in Innsbruck, Austria. Aguirre remained in St. Andrä for one year before starting his education at the Pontifical Gregorian University. He graduated with a doctorate in church history after writing a dissertation overseen by Pedro de Leturia.

== Career ==
=== Education ===
Aguirre came to Venezuela on 29 July 1926. He taught literature, composition, and arithmetic at the San Ignacio School in Caracas for three years before returning to Oña in 1929. He returned to Venezuela in 1937, and worked as a professor at the Interdiocesan Seminary of Caracas. In 1946, he became the first director of the San Francisco Javier School. He taught lessons about trade unions and civil rights in Ocumare de la Costa from 1948 to 1958. The Fragua Social Training Courses, which taught students across South America, Central America, and the Caribbean, was formed by Aguirre in 1960.

The National Academy of History admitted Aguirre as a member in 1940 after he wrote Historia de la Compañía de Jesús en Venezuela (History of the Society of Jesus in Venezuela).

== Politics ==
The organisations created by Aguirre were the nucleus for Catholic social teaching in Venezuela and he heavily influenced Christian democracy in Venezuela. Aguirre was a mentor to his former students at the San Ignacio School. These students formed the National Union of Students, which later became Copei.

Rafael Caldera, a student of Aguirre and future president, was introduced to Luigi Sturzo by Aguirre. Luis Herrera Campins was a member of a university study circle organised by Aguirre and Valmore Acevedo Amaya. Marjorie Bradford Melville attended a lecture by Aguirre in Guatemala City in 1962, and she stated that his speech made her realise the problems in Guatemala were worse than she previously knew.

The magazine Seminario Interdiocesano Caracas (SIC) was created by Aguirre in 1938, and he was its director until his death except for the years 1949 to 1954. He was one of the co-founders of Centro Gumilla, which had SIC as its official publication.

The Caracas Workers' Circle, which was guided by the Workers' Circles of Brazil, was formed by Aguirre in 1945, and had around 2,000 families in its membership by 1955. The labour organisation Confederación de Sindicatos Autónomos de Venezuela (CODESA) was formed by Aguirre and his students in 1958. Christian trade unions disbanded and merged into CODESA.

Aguirre was opposed to capitalism, believing that it was a "true economic dictatorship" similar to both feudalism and communism. He wanted a harmonious relationship between capital and labour. According to his brother Genaro, Aguirre believed by the 1960s that a revolution was needed to improve the plight of the masses.

== Personal life ==
On 19 June 1943, Aguirre became the first Jesuit to receive naturalized citizenship in Venezuela. He moved to El Paraíso, Caracas in 1967. He died in Caracas on 28 February 1969 due to heart failure.

== Works cited ==
=== Books ===
- Kunkel, Sönke; Gienow-Hecht, Jessica; Jobs, Sebastian (2023). Visions of Humanity: Historical Cultural Practices since 1850. Berghahn Books. ISBN 9781805390855.
- Herman, Donald (1980). Christian Democracy in Venezuela. University of North Carolina Press. ISBN 0807814253.

=== Web ===
- "Un campeón del esfuerzo" (in Spanish). Rafael Caldera. Archived from the original on 11 May 2026.
- "Manuel Aguirre: Pionero de la justicia social Venezuela" (in Spanish). Andrés Bello Catholic University. 4 April 2025. Archived from the original on 11 May 2026.
- Echenique, Schirley (24 September 2025). "P. Manuel Aguirre Elorriaga, S.J. (1904–1969) Amado y respetado" (in Spanish). Jesuits. Archived from the original on 11 May 2026.
- Lazcano, José. "Aguirre Elorriaga, Manuel" (in Spanish). Diccionario de Historia de Venezuela. Archived from the original on 11 May 2026.
