= El Limón, Aragua =

El Limón
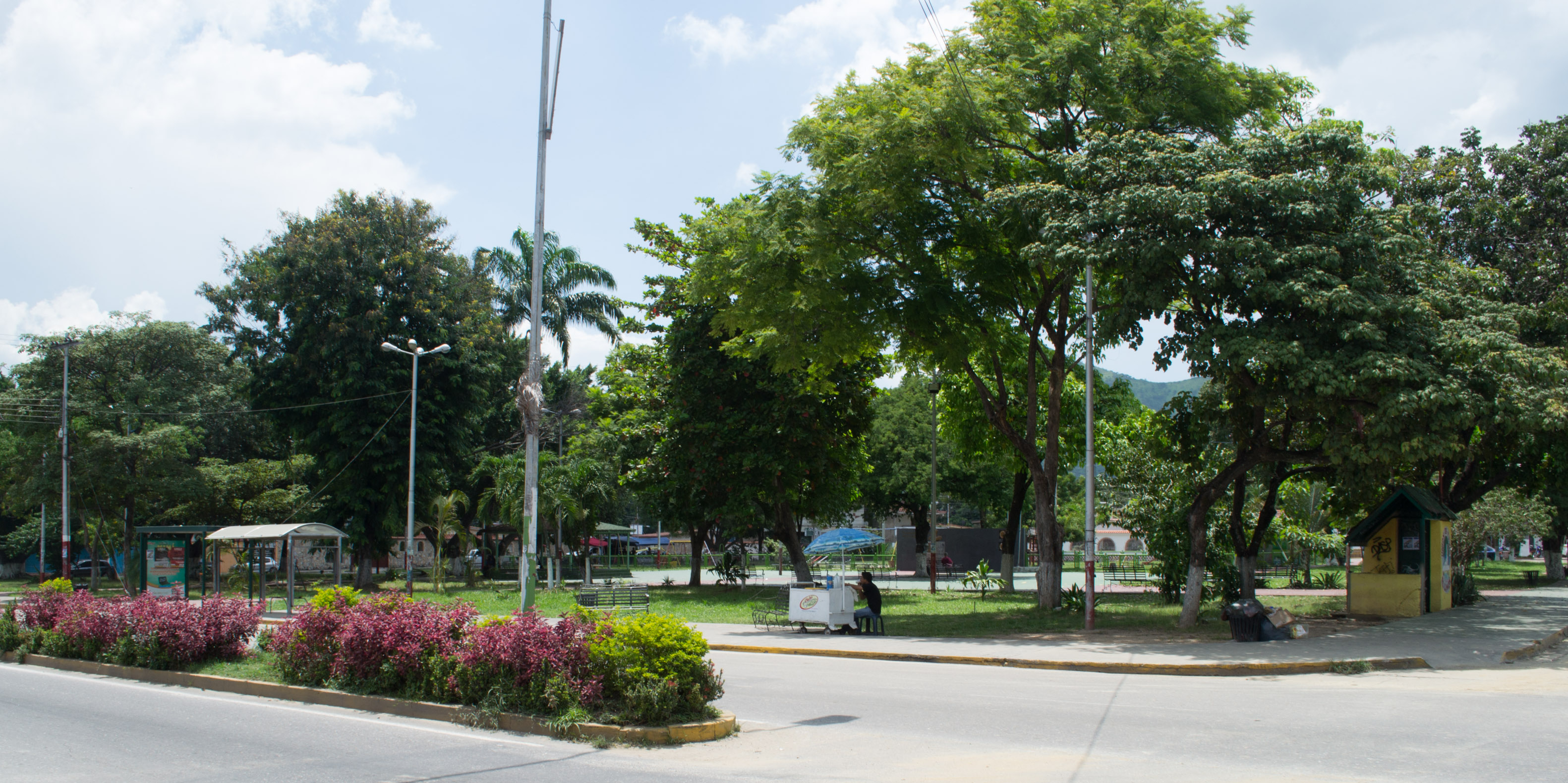
- Bolívar Square

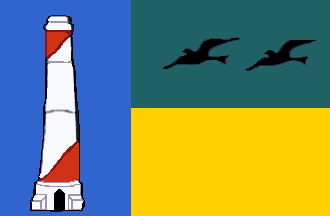
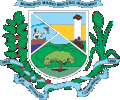
- Flag Coat of arms

- Location within Venezuela
- Coordinates: 10°18′01″N 67°38′01″W
- Country: Venezuela
- State: Aragua
- Municipality: Mario Briceño Iragorry Municipality

Area
  - Total: 52.12 km^{2} (20.12 sq mi)
- Elevation: 483 m (1,585 ft)

Population
  - Total: 106,206
  - Demonym: Limonense
- Time zone: UTC−4 (VET)
- Postal code: 2105
- Climate: Aw

El Limón is a city in the state of Aragua, Venezuela. It is the shire town of the Mario Briceño Iragorry Municipality. From early colonial times it was a center of cane sugar production, and it remained a small town well into the twentieth century. In the second half of the twentieth century it has grown in size with substantial industrialization.

The El Limón River flows through the city, and gives the city its name. On 6 September 1987 the city suffered from heavy flooding of the river. "Heavy rainfall over the first few days of September caused the river to overflow and take everything in its path with it, including roads, houses, cars and, worst of all, lives."

The annual San Sebastian's Walk begins in El Limón, proceeds through Henri Pittier National Park, and finishes 42 km away in Ocumare de la Costa.

== See also ==
- List of cities and towns in Venezuela
