= Maruri =

Maruri may refer to:

- Eduardo Maruri (born 1966), Ecuadorian business man and politician
- Jose Joaquin de Olmedo y Maruri (1780–1847), Ecuadorian president
- Maruri-Jatabe, a town and municipality in the province of Biscay, Basque Country, Spain
