= San Sebastian's Walk =

Venezuelan Catholic tradition

The San Sebastian's Walk is a religious catholic event with ecological and sport characteristics, which takes place the last Saturday of January of each year in the outskirts of the city of Maracay, Aragua State, in Venezuela.

The route of this peregrination begins in El Limón and finishes in the Main Church of Ocumare de la Costa. The route is 29.09 miles long crossing the mountains of the Henri Pittier National Park using the only paved route that unites the city of Maracay with the coastal zone of Venezuela.

== History ==
The origin of this event is associated to Celso Bethencourt, who was born in Canary Islands, Spain, and to Francesco Centrone, originally from Italy, who made this first route walking with no stops to fulfill a religious promise to Saint Sebastian, finishing their long walk 20 January 1987 in approximately 12 hours, after this first peregrination Francesco Centrone continued making this passage, every year on the same day; year after year making the long walk with family and friends, forming little by little a tradition. In 1996 Centrone and a group created the Foundation Peregrination Saint Sebastian to continue with the walk. The Foundation manages the donations and the money to support social programs in the town of Ocumare de la Costa and to foster ecological plans on the route.

== Route ==
The route consists on 7.8 miles of ascent, 12.4 miles of slope and 6.2 miles of level ground. The route traditionally has multiple points at which assistance is available.

== Details ==
There is a time limit to accomplish this walk of 12 hours. Starting time is at 6:00 a.m.
