= Ocumare de la Costa de Oro Municipality =

Ocumare de la Costa de Oro Municipality Municipio Ocumare de la Costa de Oro
- Municipality
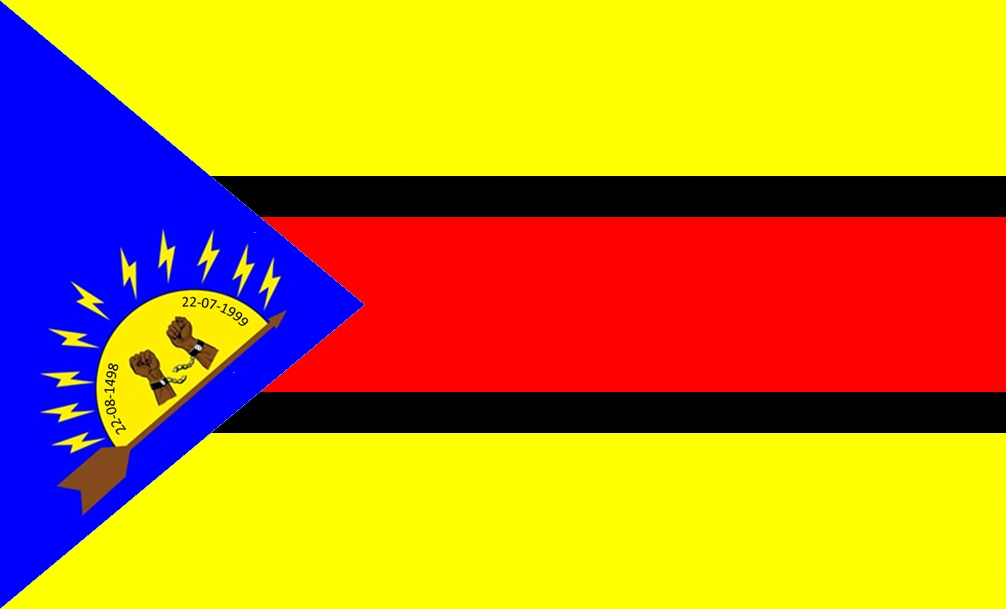
- Flag

- Location in Aragua

- Location in Venezuela
- Coordinates: 10°25′15″N 67°45′15″W
- Country: Venezuela
- State: Aragua

Government
  - Mayor: Wilmer Leal Medina (PSUV)

Area
  - Total: 428.9 km^{2} (165.6 sq mi)

Population (2011)
  - Total: 12,816
  - Density: 29.88/km^{2} (77.39/sq mi)
- Time zone: UTC−4 (VET)
- Area code(s): 0243
- Website: Official website

The Ocumare de la Costa de Oro Municipality is one of the 18 municipalities (municipios) that makes up the Venezuelan state of Aragua and, according to the 2011 census by the National Institute of Statistics of Venezuela, the municipality has a population of 12,816. The town of Ocumare de la Costa is the shire town of the Ocumare de la Costa de Oro Municipality.

== History ==
Ocumare de la Costa, known for its attractive tourist beaches, hides a great history in its mountains. Today, traveling from other parts of the country to Ocumare is easy compared with previous years; one had to travel by horse and carriage through the mountains (passing through the towns of San Joaquin, El Loro, Hacienda Santa Maria, and Cumboto on the way) in order to get to Ocumare de la Costa. In 1921, the construction of today's modern highway began, and it was completed in 1927.

== Demographics ==
The Ocumare de la Costa de Oro Municipality, according to a 2007 population estimate by the National Institute of Statistics of Venezuela, has a population of 9,605 (up from 8,239 in 2000). This amounts to 0.6% of the state's population. The municipality's population density is 28.25 inhabitants per square kilometre (73.2/sq mi).

== Government ==
The mayor of the Ocumare de la Costa de Oro Municipality is Roberto José Madero, re-elected on October 31, 2004, with 40% of the vote. The municipality is divided into one parish; Capital Ocumare de La Costa de Oro.

== See also ==
- Ocumare de la Costa
- Aragua
- Municipalities of Venezuela
