= Mario Briceño Iragorry Municipality =

Mario Briceño Iragorry Municipality Municipio Mario Briceño Iragorry
- Municipality
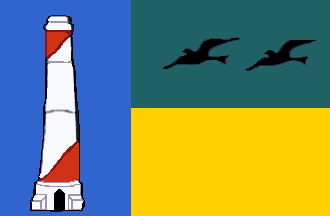
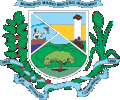
- Flag Coat of arms

- Location in Aragua

- Location in Venezuela
- Coordinates: 10°19′18″N 67°38′18″W
- Country: Venezuela
- State: Aragua
- Municipal seat: El Limón

Government
  - Mayor: Brullerby Suárez Maramara (PSUV)

Area
  - Total: 59.3 km^{2} (22.9 sq mi)

Population (2011)
  - Total: 99,852
  - Density: 1,680/km^{2} (4,360/sq mi)
- Time zone: UTC−4 (VET)
- Area code(s): 0243
- Website: Official website

The Mario Briceño Iragorry Municipality is one of the 18 municipalities (municipios) that make up the Venezuelan state of Aragua and, according to the 2011 census by the National Institute of Statistics of Venezuela, the municipality has a population of 99,852. The town of El Limón is the shire town of the Mario Briceño Iragorry Municipality. The municipality is named for the writer Mario Briceño Iragorry.

== Demographics ==
The Mario Briceño Iragorry Municipality, according to a 2007 population estimate by the National Institute of Statistics of Venezuela, has a population of 103,269 (up from 98,429 in 2000). This amounts to 6.2% of the state's population. The municipality's population density is 1,948.47 inhabitants per square kilometre (5,046.5/sq mi).

== Government ==
The mayor of the Mario Briceño Iragorry Municipality is Carlos Javier Velarde, elected on October 31, 2004, with 52% of the vote. He replaced Pedro Maurera shortly after the elections. The municipality is divided into two parishes; Capital Mario Briceño Iragorry and Caña de Azúcar (created January 30, 1995).
