= Maracay =

- City
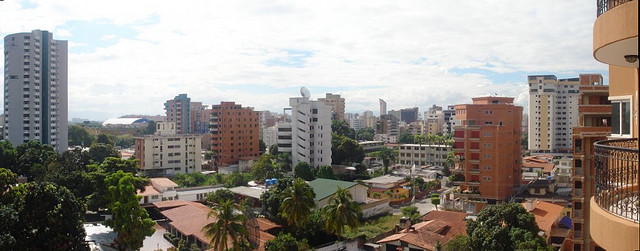
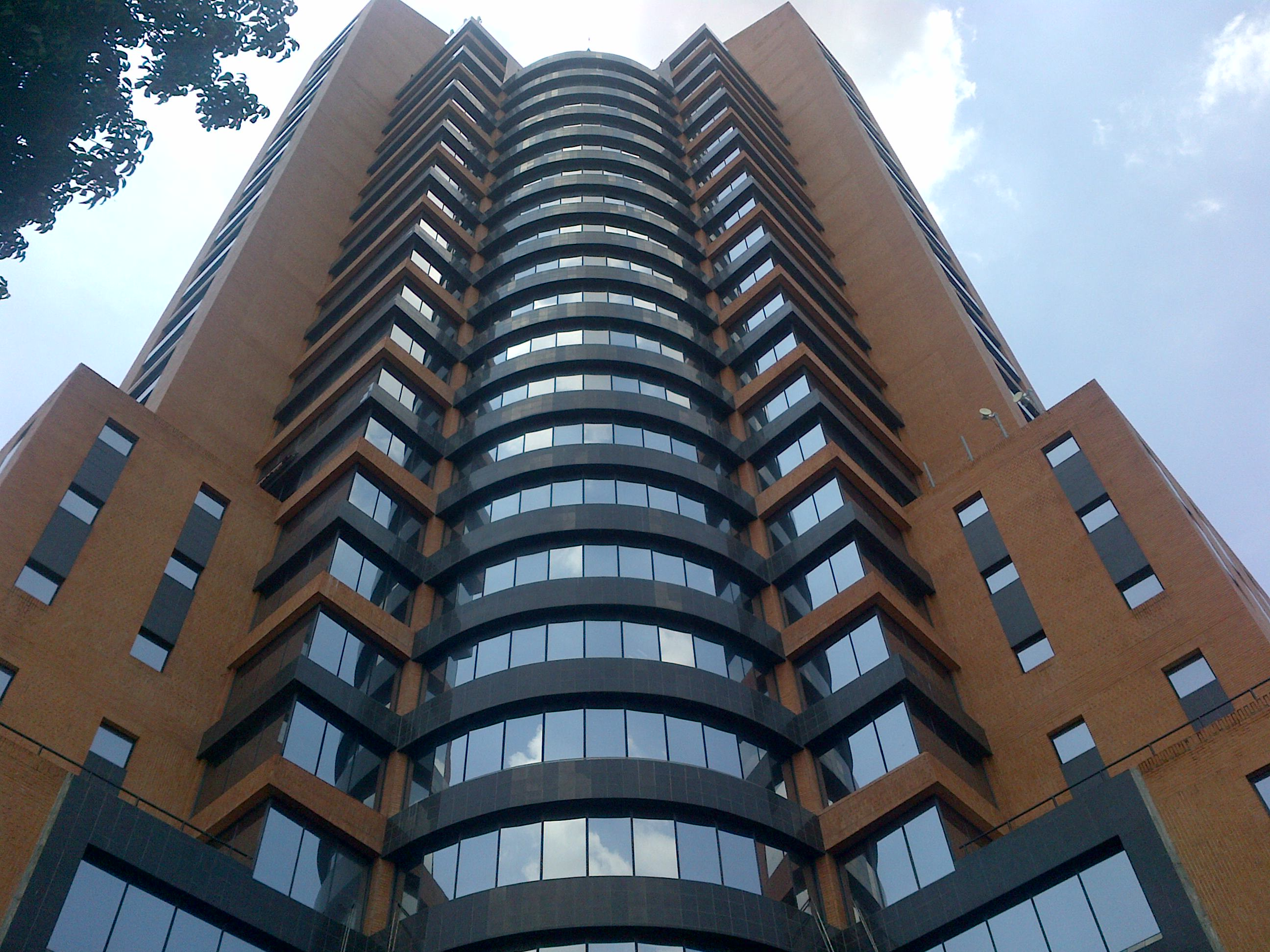
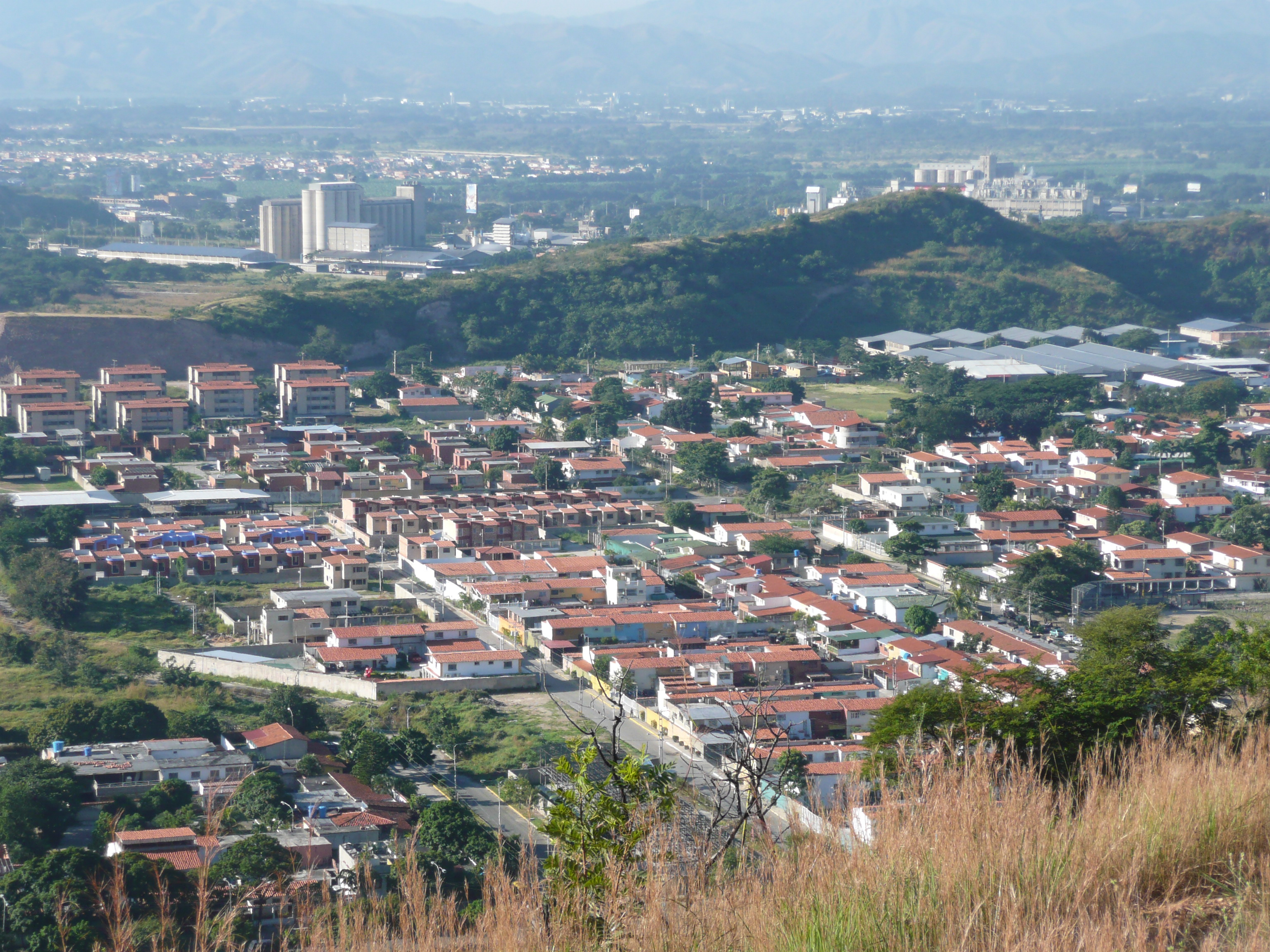
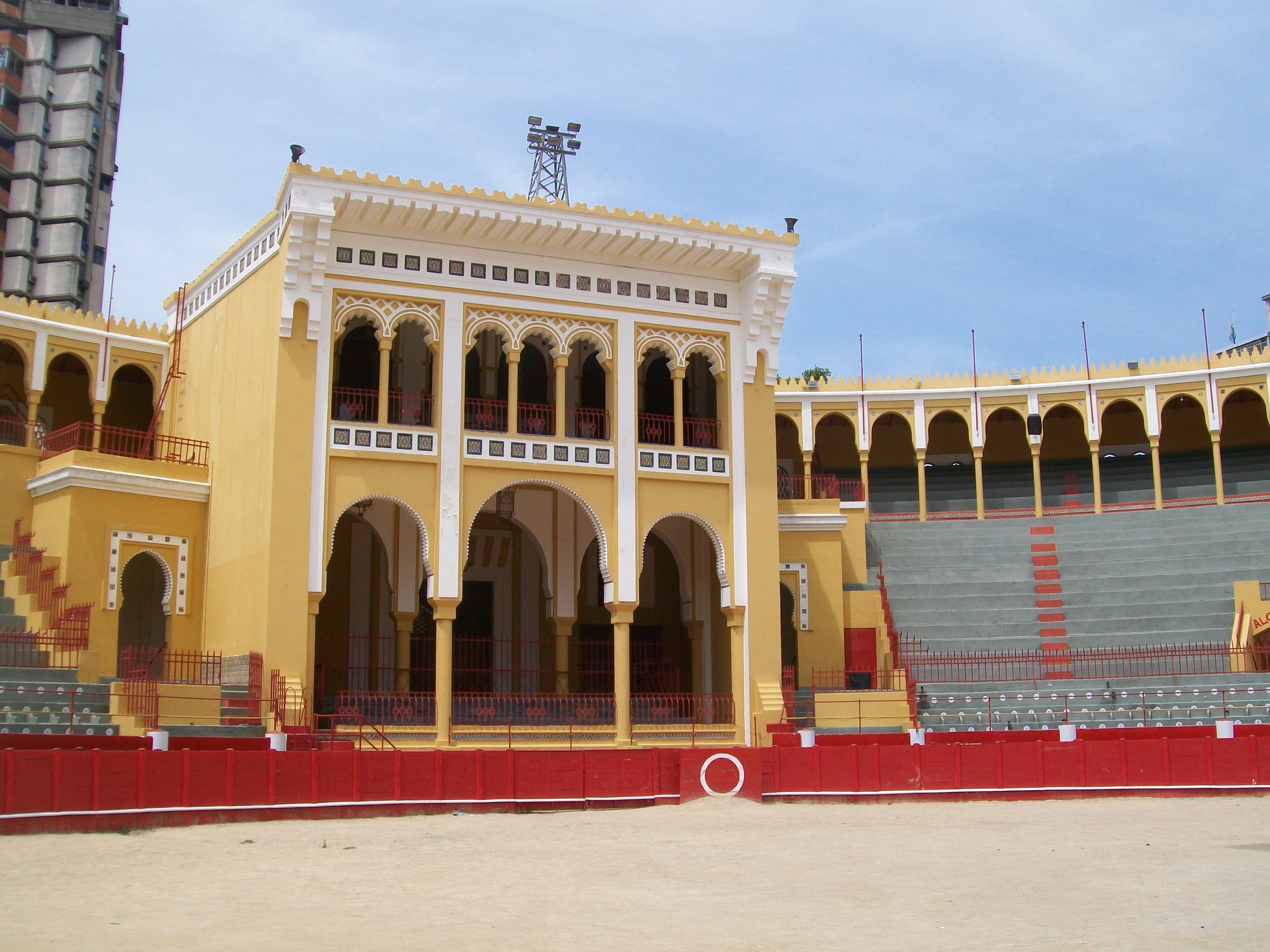
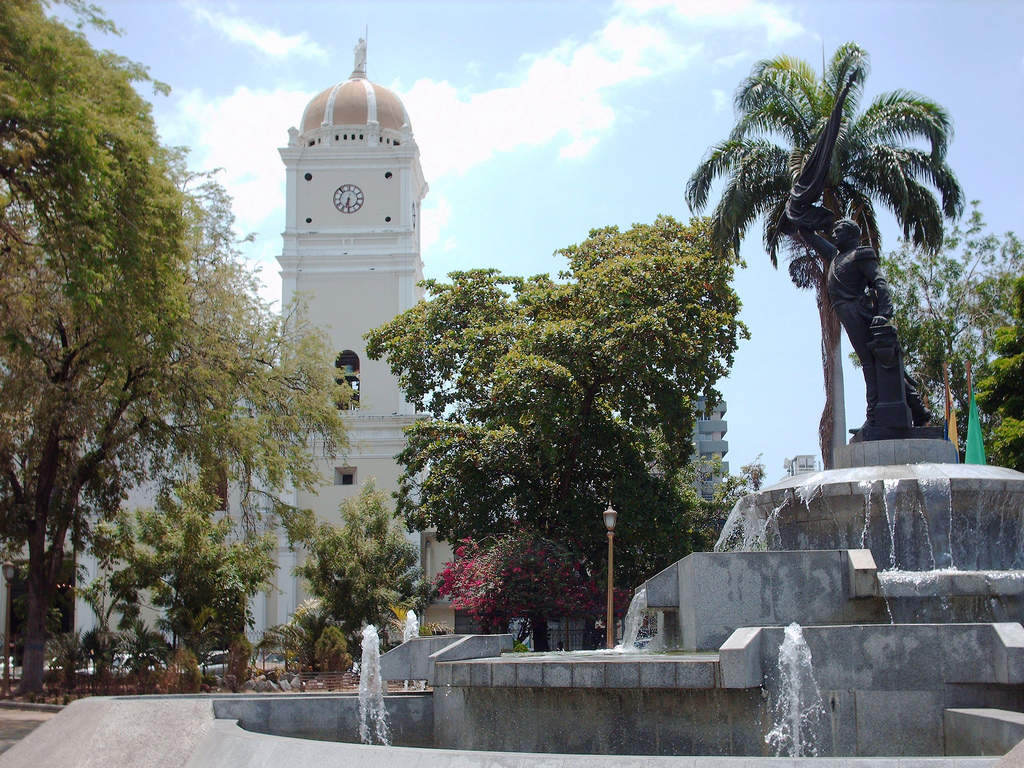
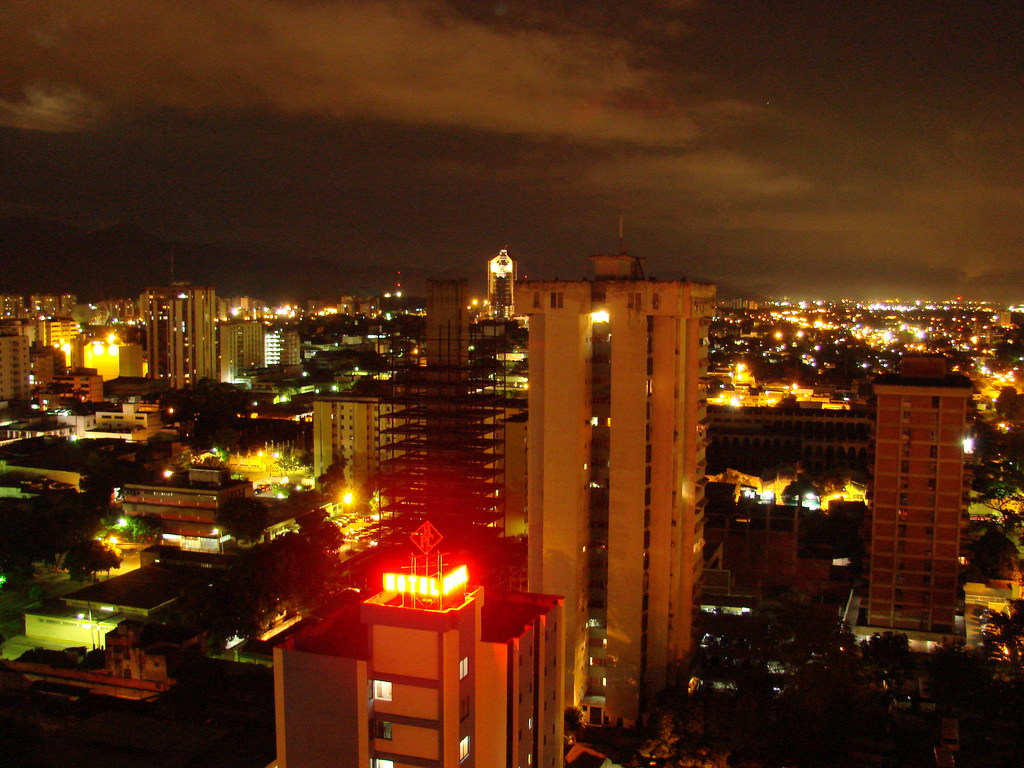
- Top: Maracay Municipal Garden and Las Delicias area. Second: Sindoni Tower, Los Tamarindo residential area and view of Maracay. Third: Maestranza Cesar Giron Bullring Stadium, Girardot Square and Maracay Assumption Cathedral. Bottom: Night view of downtown Base Aragua area

- Flag Coat of arms
- Nickname: "Ciudad Jardín" (English: Garden City)
- Location within Venezuela Location within the Caribbean
- Coordinates: 10°14′49″N 67°35′46″W
- Country: Venezuela
- State: Aragua
- Municipality: Girardot
- Founded: March 5, 1701

Government
  - Mayor: Rafael Morales

Area
  - Total: 311.57 km^{2} (120.30 sq mi)
- Elevation: 436 m (1,430 ft)

Population (2019)
  - Total: 464,700
  - Density: 1,491/km^{2} (3,863/sq mi)
  - Demonym: Maracayero(a)
- Time zone: UTC−4 (VET)
- Postal codes: 2101, 2102, 2103, 2104
- Area code: 0243
- Climate: Aw
- Website: Alcaldía de Maracay (in Spanish)
- The area and population figures are for the municipality

Maracay (Spanish pronunciation: [maɾaˈkaj]) is a city in north-central Venezuela, near the Caribbean coast, and is the capital and most important city of the state of Aragua. Most of it falls under the jurisdiction of Girardot Municipality. The population of Maracay and its surroundings in the 2011 census was 955,362. In Venezuela, Maracay is known as "Ciudad Jardín" ("Garden City").

== History ==
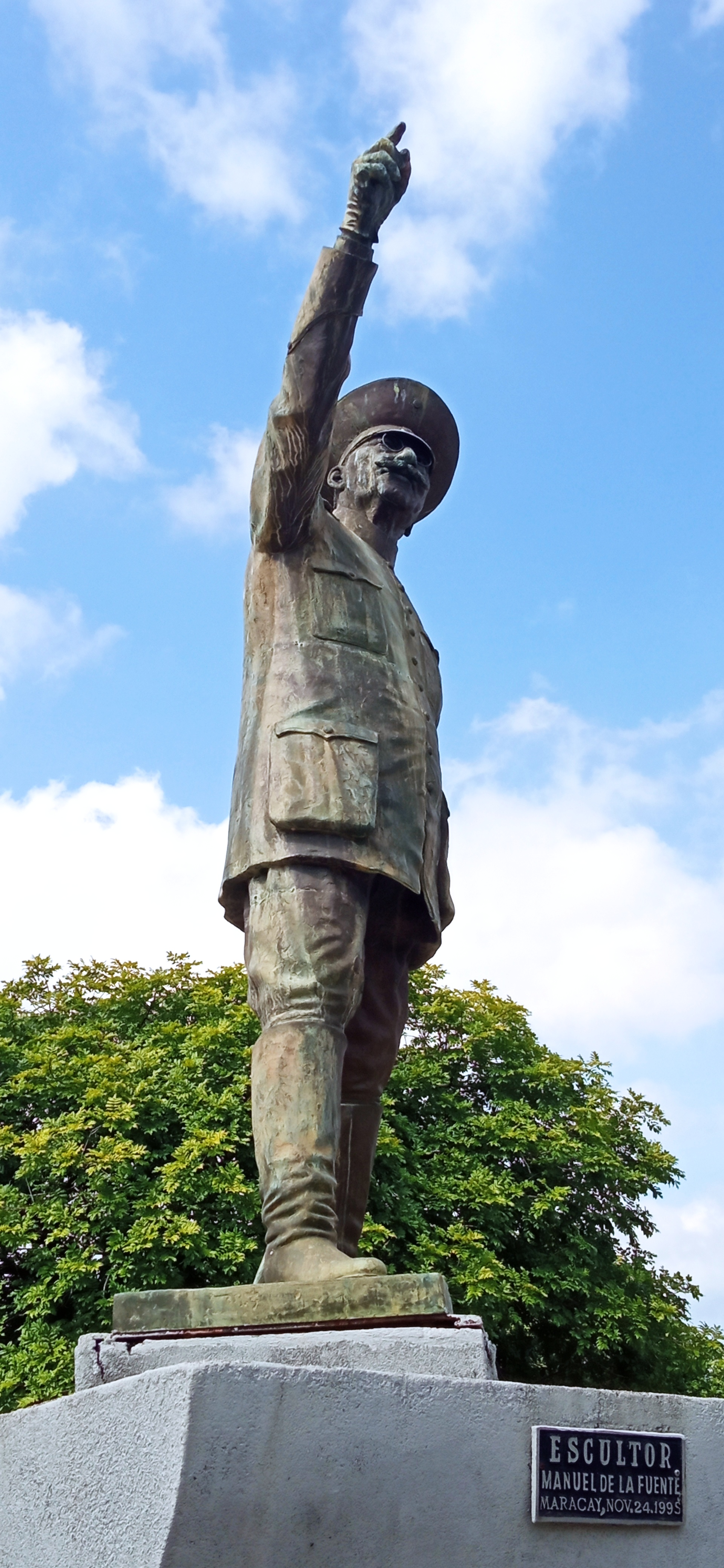
Statue of Juan Vicente Gómez in Maracay

Officially established on March 5, 1701 by Bishop Diego de Baños y Sotomayor in the valleys of Tocopio and Tapatapa (what is known today as the central valley of Aragua) in northern Venezuela.

According to the most accepted explanation, it was named after a local indigenous chief, and refers to the "Maracayo" (Felis mitis), a small tiger. Alternative etymologies cite a local aromatic tree called Mara.

Maracay experienced rapid growth during Juan Vicente Gómez's dictatorship (1908–1935). Gómez saw Maracay as a suitable place to make his residence during his rule, and ordered the construction of an Arc of Triumph, a bull plaza (a near replica of the one in Seville, Spain), an Ópera house, a Zoo, and, most notably, the Hotel Jardín (Garden Hotel), a majestic, tourist attraction with very large gardens. The city is home to the Mausoleo de Gómez (Gómez's mausoleum), where the dictator is buried.

== Economy and transport ==
One of the most important cities in Venezuela, Maracay is primarily an industrial and commercial center, the city produces paper, textiles, chemicals, tobacco, cement, cattle, processed foods, soap and perfumes.

The areas around Maracay are agricultural: sugarcane, tobacco, coffee and cocoa stand out as the main products. There are also cattle-herding and timber-cutting activities. Activity by the Venezuelan Military, particularly the Air Force, also adds a great deal to Maracay's economy.

Maracay has good transportation facilities and infrastructure. The city is linked to most other important localities by the Autopista Regional del Centro (Central Regional Highway). It also has good access to Venezuela's small national railway system. The city boasts the national hydroplane airport, located on the shore of the Lago de Valencia (Lake of Valencia). The city does not have a subway system, but one is in the planning stages.

Maracay has two airports. The Airport Mariscal Sucre (IATA: MYC ICAO: SVBS) and the military Air Base El Libertador (ICAO: SVBL)

== Climate ==
Climate data for Maracay (1991–2020, extremes 1961–2020)
Month	Jan	Feb	Mar	Apr	May	Jun	Jul	Aug	Sep	Oct	Nov	Dec	Year
Record high °C (°F)	36.7 (98.1)	37.5 (99.5)	38.5 (101.3)	37.8 (100.0)	38.5 (101.3)	36.1 (97.0)	39.4 (102.9)	35.0 (95.0)	34.8 (94.6)	35.4 (95.7)	35.1 (95.2)	35.4 (95.7)	39.4 (102.9)
Mean daily maximum °C (°F)	32.1 (89.8)	32.8 (91.0)	33.7 (92.7)	33.5 (92.3)	33.1 (91.6)	32.1 (89.8)	31.6 (88.9)	31.4 (88.5)	32.0 (89.6)	32.2 (90.0)	32.0 (89.6)	32.0 (89.6)	32.4 (90.3)
Daily mean °C (°F)	24.7 (76.5)	25.2 (77.4)	26.3 (79.3)	27.0 (80.6)	27.1 (80.8)	26.2 (79.2)	25.6 (78.1)	25.5 (77.9)	26.1 (79.0)	26.0 (78.8)	25.7 (78.3)	25.1 (77.2)	25.9 (78.6)
Mean daily minimum °C (°F)	18.9 (66.0)	19.3 (66.7)	20.5 (68.9)	21.9 (71.4)	22.8 (73.0)	22.1 (71.8)	21.5 (70.7)	21.8 (71.2)	22.2 (72.0)	22.2 (72.0)	21.6 (70.9)	20.0 (68.0)	21.2 (70.2)
Record low °C (°F)	12.2 (54.0)	12.0 (53.6)	13.3 (55.9)	13.9 (57.0)	17.0 (62.6)	16.6 (61.9)	14.6 (58.3)	15.3 (59.5)	17.3 (63.1)	14.5 (58.1)	15.3 (59.5)	8.5 (47.3)	8.5 (47.3)
Average rainfall mm (inches)	49.9 (1.96)	28.4 (1.12)	15.8 (0.62)	59.6 (2.35)	89.6 (3.53)	124.6 (4.91)	171.3 (6.74)	194.0 (7.64)	168.7 (6.64)	181.0 (7.13)	129.0 (5.08)	88.1 (3.47)	1,300 (51.18)
Average rainy days (≥ 1.0 mm)	2.0	1.2	1.2	4.1	7.2	10.1	12.4	13.6	10.5	10.6	6.8	4.1	83.8
Average relative humidity (%)	71	68	66	68	74	78	80	81	80	80	78	74	75
Mean monthly sunshine hours	285.2	268.8	288.3	225.0	207.7	201.0	220.1	229.4	228.0	235.6	246.0	269.7	2,904.8
Mean daily sunshine hours	9.2	9.6	9.3	7.5	6.7	6.7	7.1	7.4	7.6	7.6	8.2	8.7	8.0
Source: NOAA (sun 1961–1990)

== Military ==
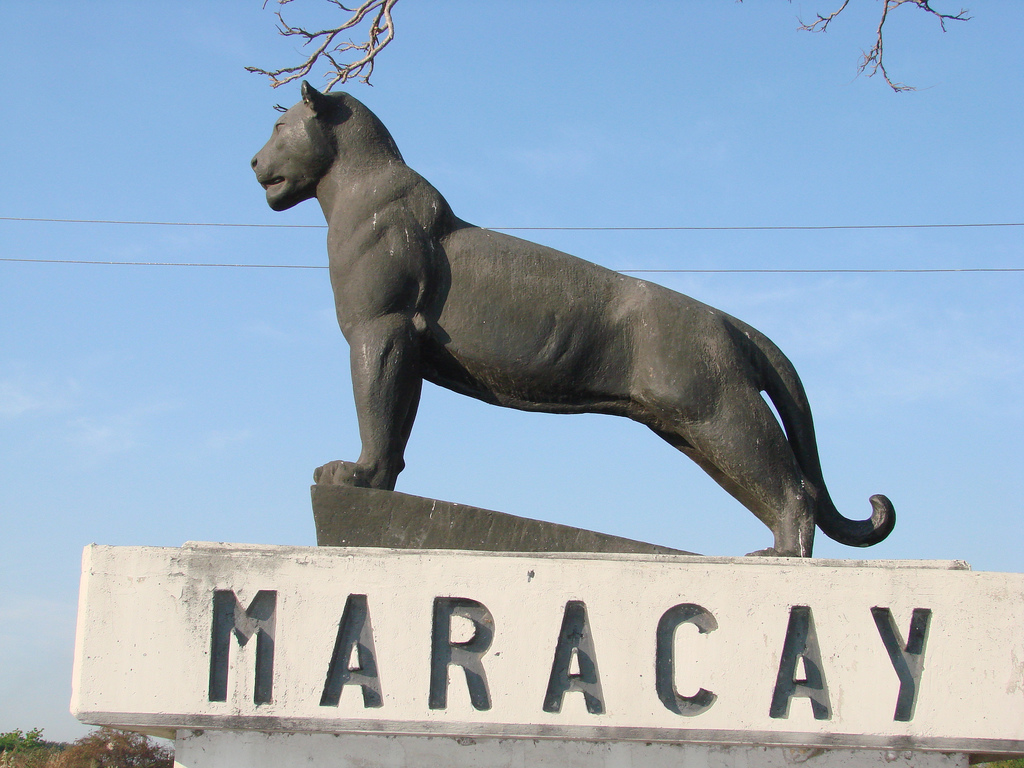
The jaguar, symbol of the Maracaya Indians

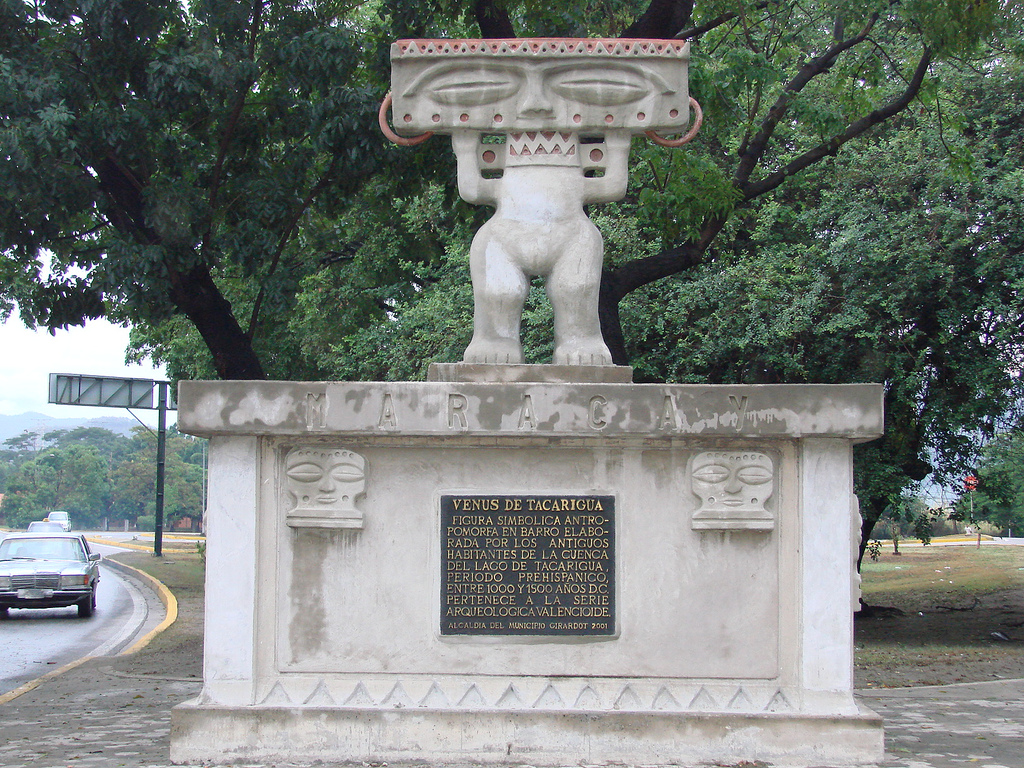
Venus de Tacarigua, another symbol of Maracay

Maracay is a city heavily influenced by the military. Maracay is the cradle of Venezuelan aviation, and it is home to the two largest Air Force bases in the country. The Venezuelan F-16 fighter planes are stationed here, as well as the new Sukhoi-30MKEs acquired by the Venezuelan Government.

Other military facilities include the Fourth Armored Division of the Army and the airborne training center and barracks of the 42nd Airborne Brigade.

It is also home to the government-owned ammunition and weapons factory (CAVIM) that produces the Venezuelan version of the FN FAL (Fusil Automatique Leger - Light Automatic Rifle) rifle and the AK-103s; as well as the ammunition for both models.

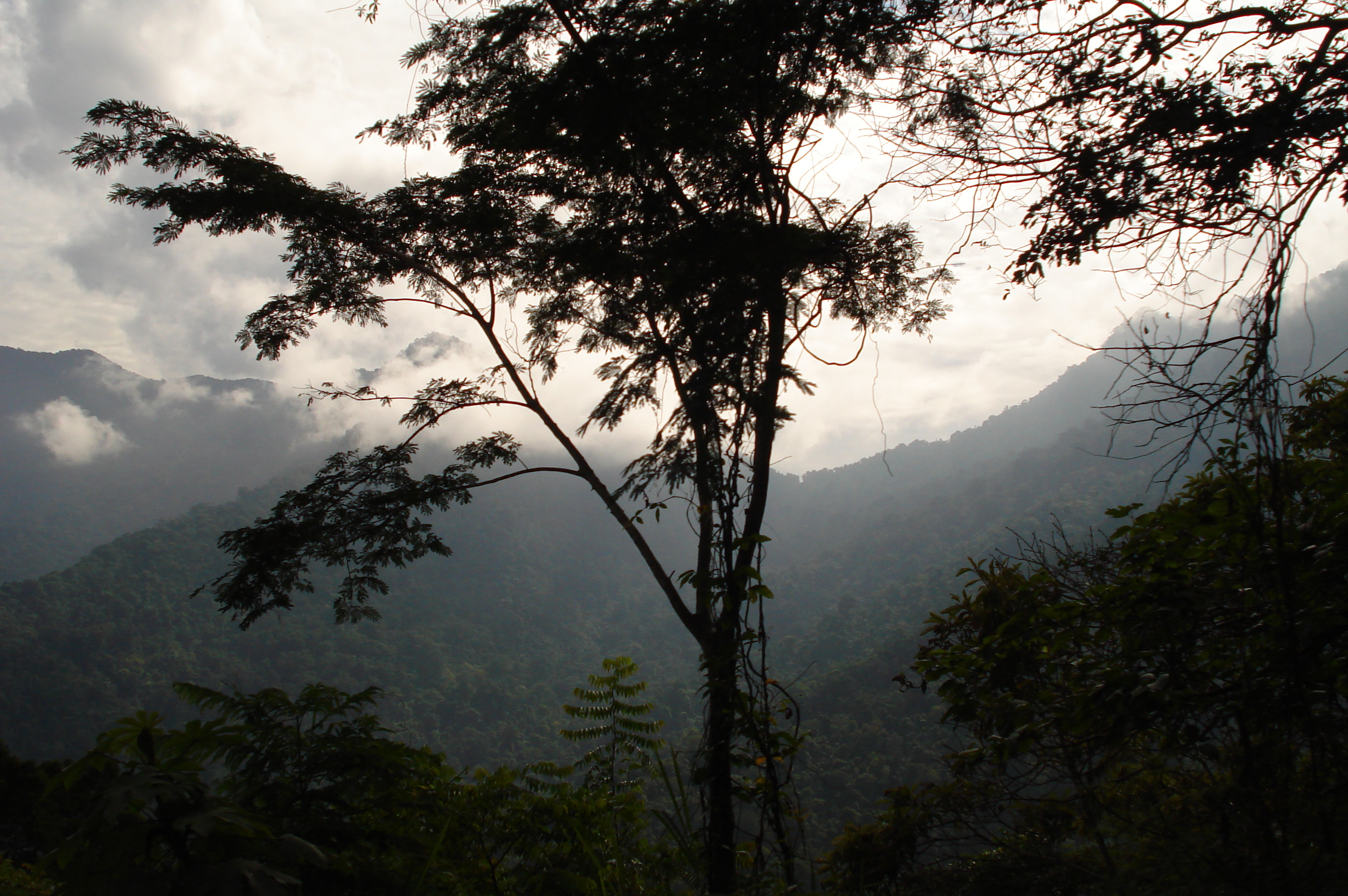
Section of the Henri Pittier National Park as seen from a hill.

== Natural reserves ==
The mountains on the north side of Maracay, that separate it from the coast, make up the Henri Pittier National Park, named after the Swiss naturalist that studied them. The park is a lush rainforest, noted for its variety of ferns. Two very winding roads cut through the park over the mountains to the coast. One, beginning at the North-Central part of the city known as Urbanización El Castaño, goes to the beach town of Choroní. The other, beginning at the North-Western part at the city of El Limón, goes to Ocumare de la Costa and the beaches of Cata and Cuyagua.

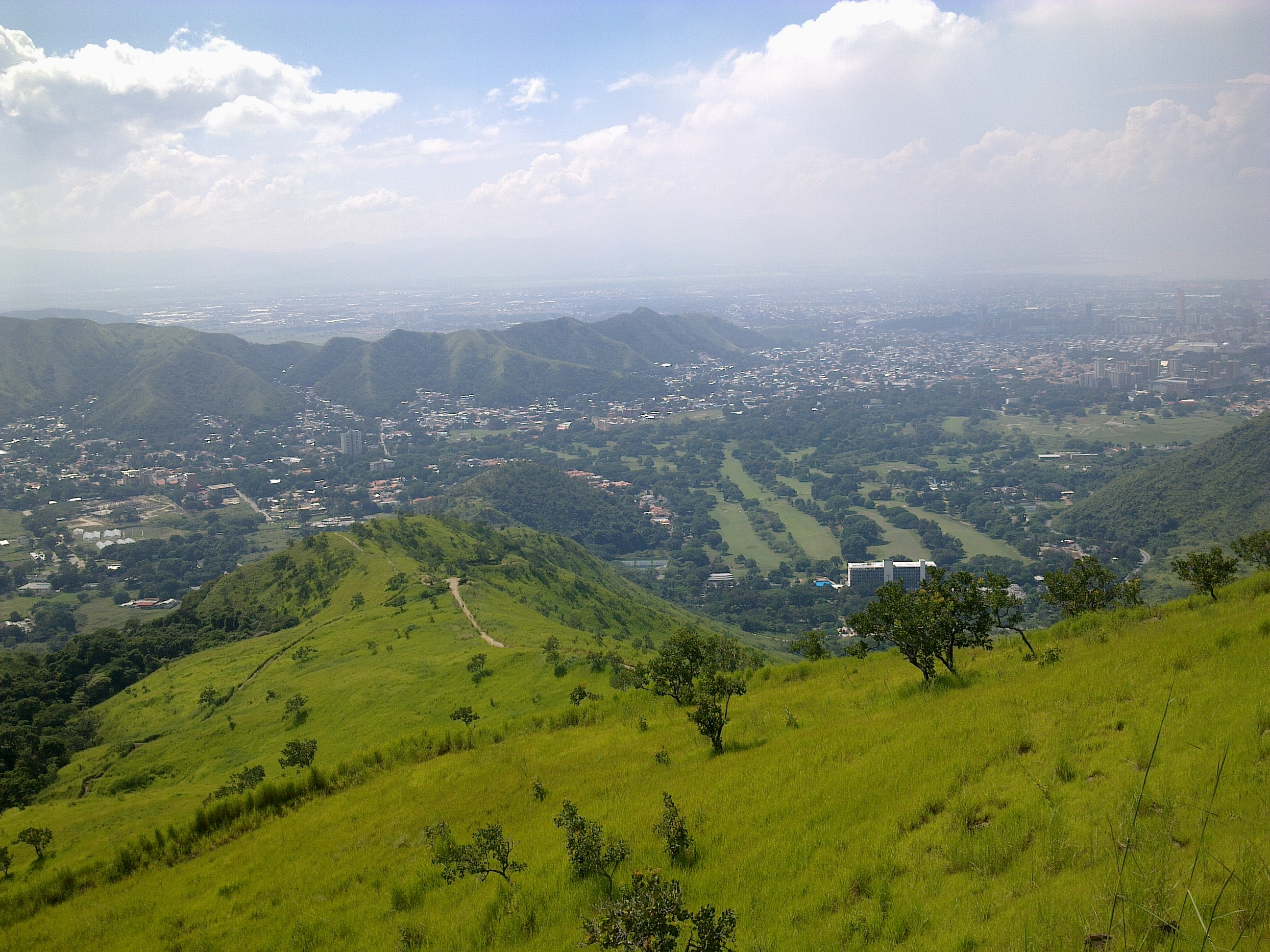
View of Maracay from the hills.

== Higher educational institutions and cultural venues ==
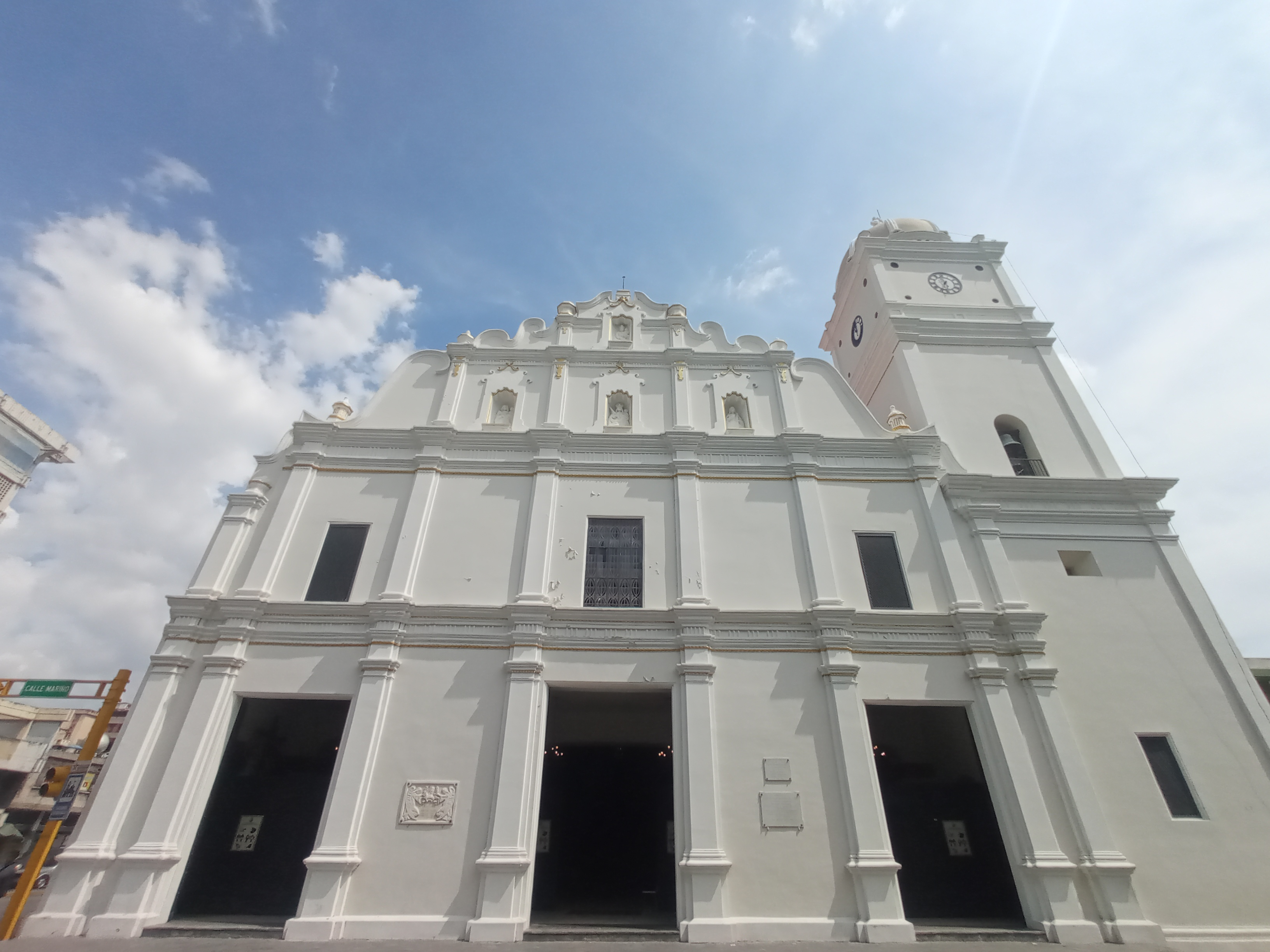
Cathedral of Maracay.

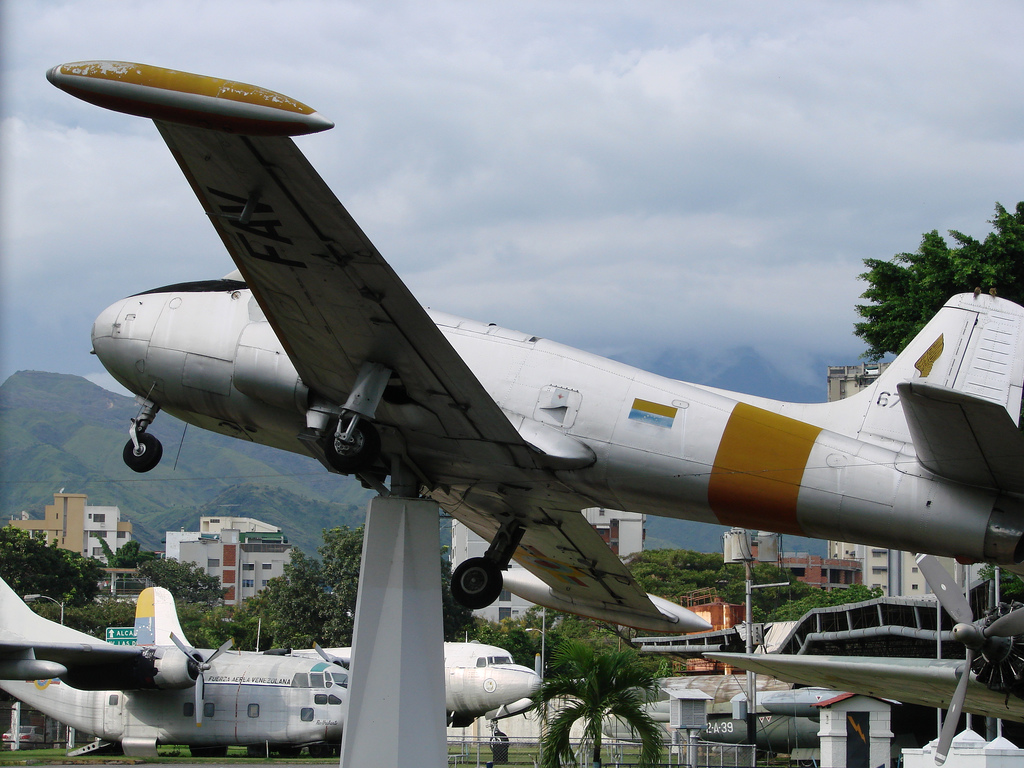
Aviation Museum.

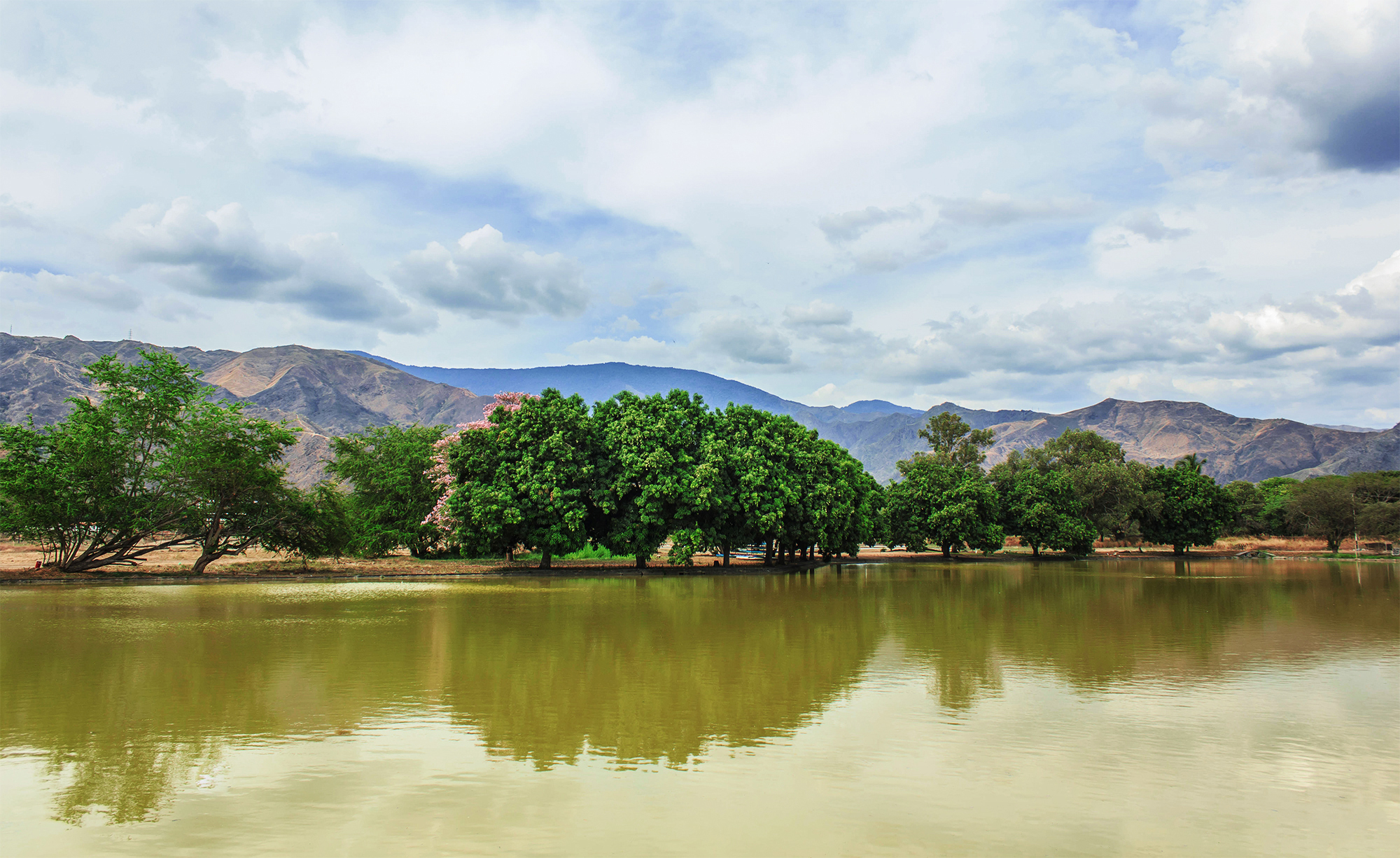
Landscape in Maracay.

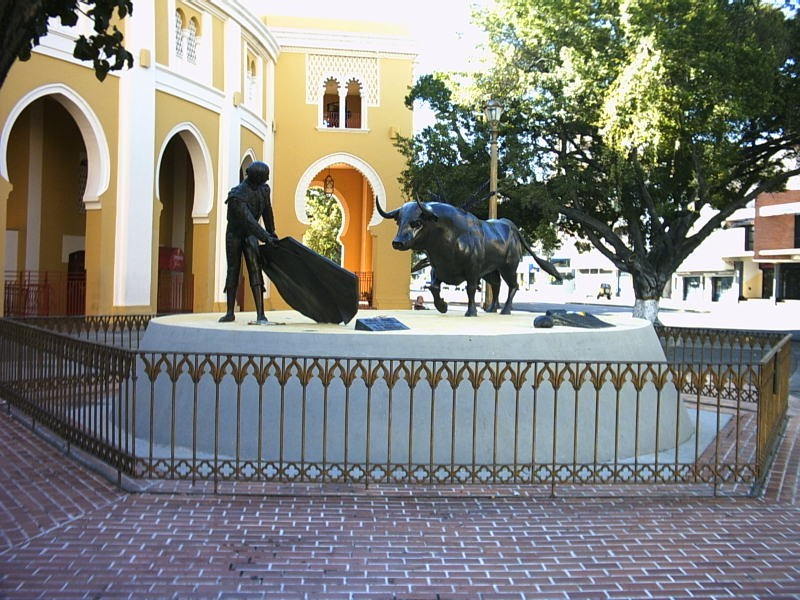
César Girón square

Maracay houses the Faculty of Veterinarians and Agronomy of the Universidad Central de Venezuela, and an extension of the Universidad de Carabobo.

The main Campus of the UNEFA (a military university open to civilians) is located here. Career choices include electronics, aeronautical and civil engineering, and avionics.

== Museums ==
The main museums are:

- The Anthropological Museum.
- The Aviation Museum.
- The Museum of Modern Arts "Mario Abreu".
- The Opera House.

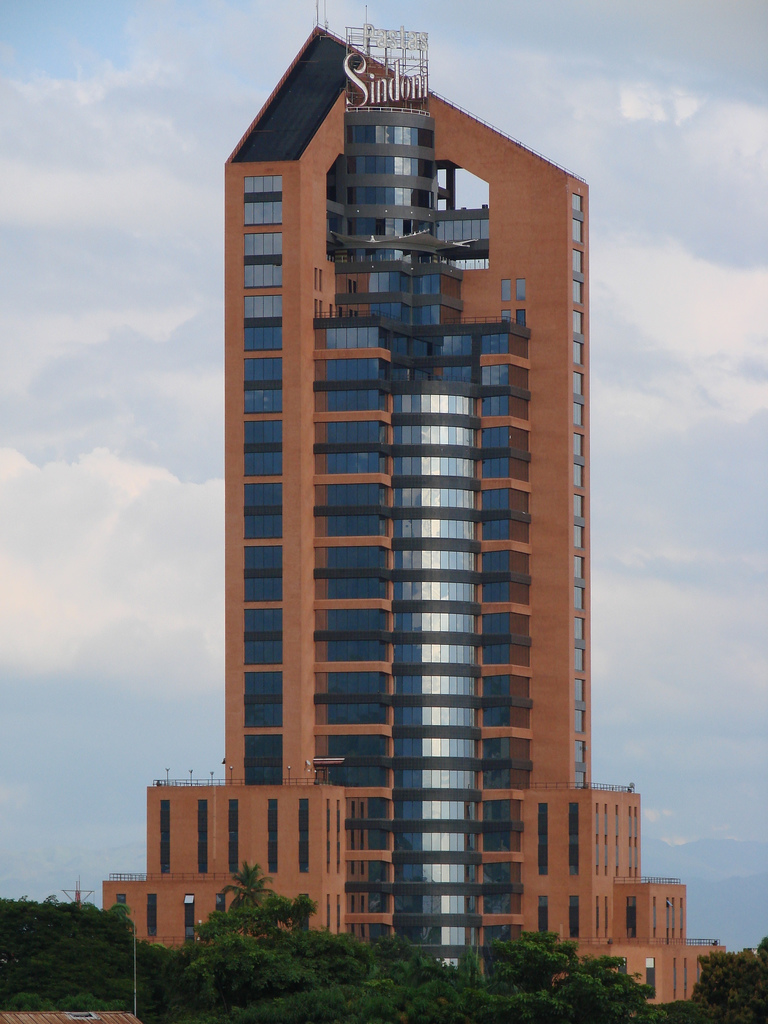
Sindoni tower is the tallest tower outside the capital

== Religion ==
The Patron Saint is Saint Joseph.

The San Sebastian's Walk is a religious catholic event with ecological and sport characteristics, which takes place the 20th of January of each year in the outskirts of the city of Maracay.

The city of Maracay has no synagogue. However, nine indigenous inhabitants converted to Conservative Judaism in Valencia in 2014. In 2016, they were denied the right to emigrate to Israel by the Israeli Ministry of Interior, under the assumption that they failed to "belong to a Jewish community" in Maracay.

== Sports ==
Maracay is the home of the local baseball team Tigres de Aragua.

The city's Bullfight arena is the only bullfighting school in the country. It is called "Maestranza Cesar Girón"

== Mass media ==
- TV Stations: TVS, TVR (Orbivisión), Color TV, TIC TV (Televisión Informativa del Centro), Novavisión TV, Aragua TV.
- Newspapers: El Aragüeño, El Periodiquito, El Siglo, El Impreso
- Websites: maracaycity.net, MaracayUp, Maracay Extrema, En Aragua, Ciudad Maracay

== People ==
- Bobby Abreu, baseball player
- Jesús Aguilar, baseball player
- Juan Arango, soccer player
- Jose Altuve, baseball player
- Elvis Andrus, baseball player
- Eduard Bazardo, baseball player
- Yorman Bazardo, baseball player
- La Divaza, YouTuber and singer
- Juan-Carlos Bianchi, tennis player
- Miguel Cabrera, baseball player
- Alberto Callaspo, baseball player
- Nunzio Daniel Coffaro Zuzzolo, rally driver
- David Concepción, baseball player
- Canserbero, rapper
- Kervin Castro, baseball player
- Yonathan Daza, baseball player
- Gaby Espino, actress, model and TV presenter
- César Girón, bullfighter
- Samin Gómez, racing driver
- Carlos Guillén, baseball player
- Luis Laguna, musician and songwriter
- Pilín León, Miss World 1981
- Alicia Machado, Miss Universe 1996
- Manuel Maldonado, racing driver
- Pastor Maldonado, Formula One driver
- Omar Narváez, baseball player
- Martín Prado, baseball player
- Sebastián Rivero, baseball player
- Maira Alexandra Rodriguez, Miss Earth Water 2014
- Aníbal Sánchez, baseball player
- Yolmer Sánchez, baseball player
- Ezequiel Tovar, baseball player
- Jorge Valdivia, soccer player
