= Maruri-Jatabe =

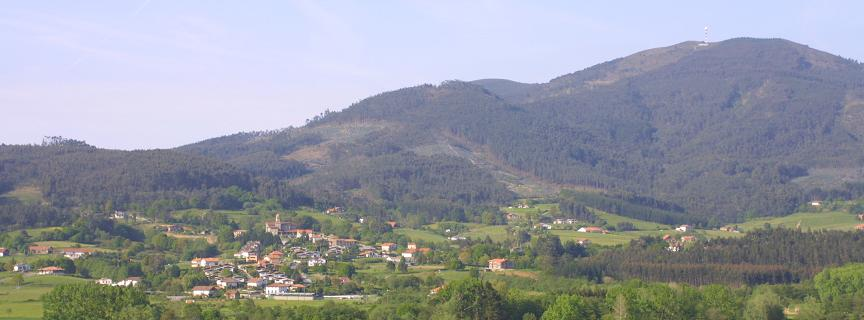
- Village of Maruri-Jatabe, Basque Country, Spain

- Flag Coat of arms

- Location of Maruri-Jatabe within the Basque Country Location of Maruri-Jatabe within Spain
- Coordinates: 43°23′47″N 2°52′8″W
- Country: Spain
- Autonomous community: Basque Country
- Province: Biscay
- Comarca: Uribe-Kosta

Government
  - Mayor: Joseba Koldo Alzaga Muruaga

Area
  - Total: 15.8 km^{2} (6.1 sq mi)
- Elevation: 23 m (75 ft)

Population (2025-01-01)
  - Total: 1,129
  - Density: 71.5/km^{2} (185/sq mi)
- Time zone: UTC+1 (CET)
  - Summer (DST): UTC+2 (CEST)
- Postal code: 48112
- Website: www.maruri-jatabe.net

Maruri-Jatabe is a town and municipality located in the province of Biscay, in the autonomous community of Basque Country, northern Spain.

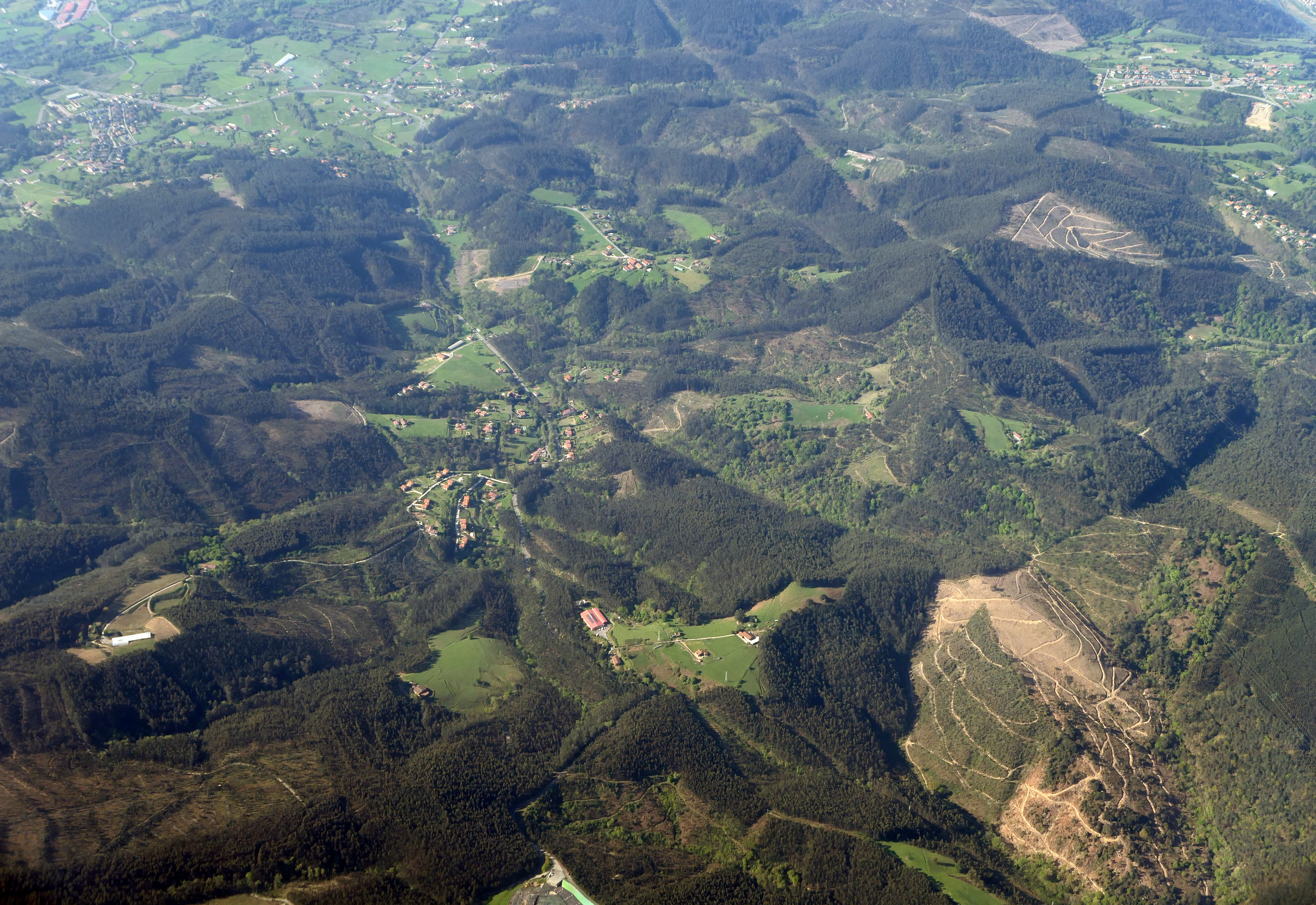
Aerial view of the northern part of the municipality. The small village is Maruri, also known as Goieta.

== Notable people ==
- Manuel Aguirre, priest and Jesuit

== Works cited ==
- Lazcano, José. "Aguirre Elorriaga, Manuel". Diccionario de Historia de Venezuela. Archived from the original on 11 May 2026.
