= Ocumare de la Costa =

- San Sebastián de Ocumare de la Costa
- Location within Venezuela
- Coordinates: 10°29′10″N 67°46′21″W
- Country: Venezuela
- State: Aragua
- Municipality: Ocumare de la Costa de Oro Municipality

Population
  - Total: 7,000
  - Demonym: Ocumareño/a
- Time zone: UTC−4 (VET)

Ocumare de la Costa (Spanish pronunciation: [okuˈmaɾe ðe la ˈkosta]) is a small coastal town and the capital of the Ocumare de la Costa de Oro Municipality, located 25 miles north of Aragua, Venezuela. Called simply Ocumare, the colonial town sits at the skirts of the Venezuelan Coastal Range, adding the peculiar natural elements of the Henri Pittier National Park. Production of cocoa and fishing are the main industries in Ocumare. The valley leads into the Caribbean Sea.

== History ==
Ocumare was colonized in the 17th century led by Spanish captain Lorenzo Martínez Madrid and incorporated in 1731. The original inhabitants of the area were indigenous tribes under Cacique “Barriga”.

Simón Bolívar issued two decrees supporting the abolition of slavery. The first was issued in Carupano on 2 June 1816, and the second in Ocumare de la Costa on 6 July.

Manuel Aguirre taught classes in Ocumare de la Costa from 1948 to 1958.

== Economy ==
Cocoa beans are farmed in the area.

== Notable people ==
- Dave Concepción, professional baseball player
- Juan Vicente Gómez, 31st, 33rd, and 35th President of Venezuela

== See also ==
- List of cities and towns in Venezuela

== Works cited ==
=== Books ===
- Armour, Mark, ed. (2014). The Great Eight: The 1975 Cincinnati Reds. University of Nebraska Press. ISBN 9780803245860.
- Herman, Donald (1980). Christian Democracy in Venezuela. University of North Carolina Press. ISBN 0807814253.

=== Journals ===
- Guédez, José (1999). "Simón Bolívar y la abolición de la esclavitud en Venezuela 1810-1830. Problemas y frustración de una causa". Revista de Historia de América (125). Pan American Institute of Geography and History: 7–20. doi:10.2307/20140008. JSTOR 20140008.

=== Web ===
- "Ocumare commune preserves ancestral cocoa crops". Ministry of Popular Power for Communes and Social Movements. 6 July 2023. Archived from the original on 24 July 2026.
