= Diccionario de Historia de Venezuela =

Encyclopedia of Venezuelan History

- Genre: Historical encyclopedia
- Publisher: Fundación Polar, Caracas

The Dictionary of Venezuelan History (Spanish original title: Diccionario de Historia de Venezuela) is a historical reference work compiled since 1979 and first published in 1988. It was a multidisciplinary project initially coordinated by the Spanish historian Manuel Pérez Vila (1922–1991) and published by the Fundación Empresas Polar.

A second edition of the encyclopedia was published in 1997. Since 2018, the work has been available in digital format.

The encyclopedia in its edition of 1997 in four volumes provides concise information, arranged alphabetically, on important figures, events, places, and institutions in Venezuelan history. It was compiled over several years by around 350 specialists and includes more than 20,000 entries as well as 35,000 bibliographic references. The encyclopedia covers various fields such as geography, politics, economics, religion, and culture.

== Editions ==
- Diccionario de Historia de Venezuela. Editorial Ex Libris, Caracas, 1988 (3 vols.)
- Diccionario de Historia de Venezuela. Fundación Polar, Caracas, 1997 (4 vols.) (in partial view)
- Online edition
